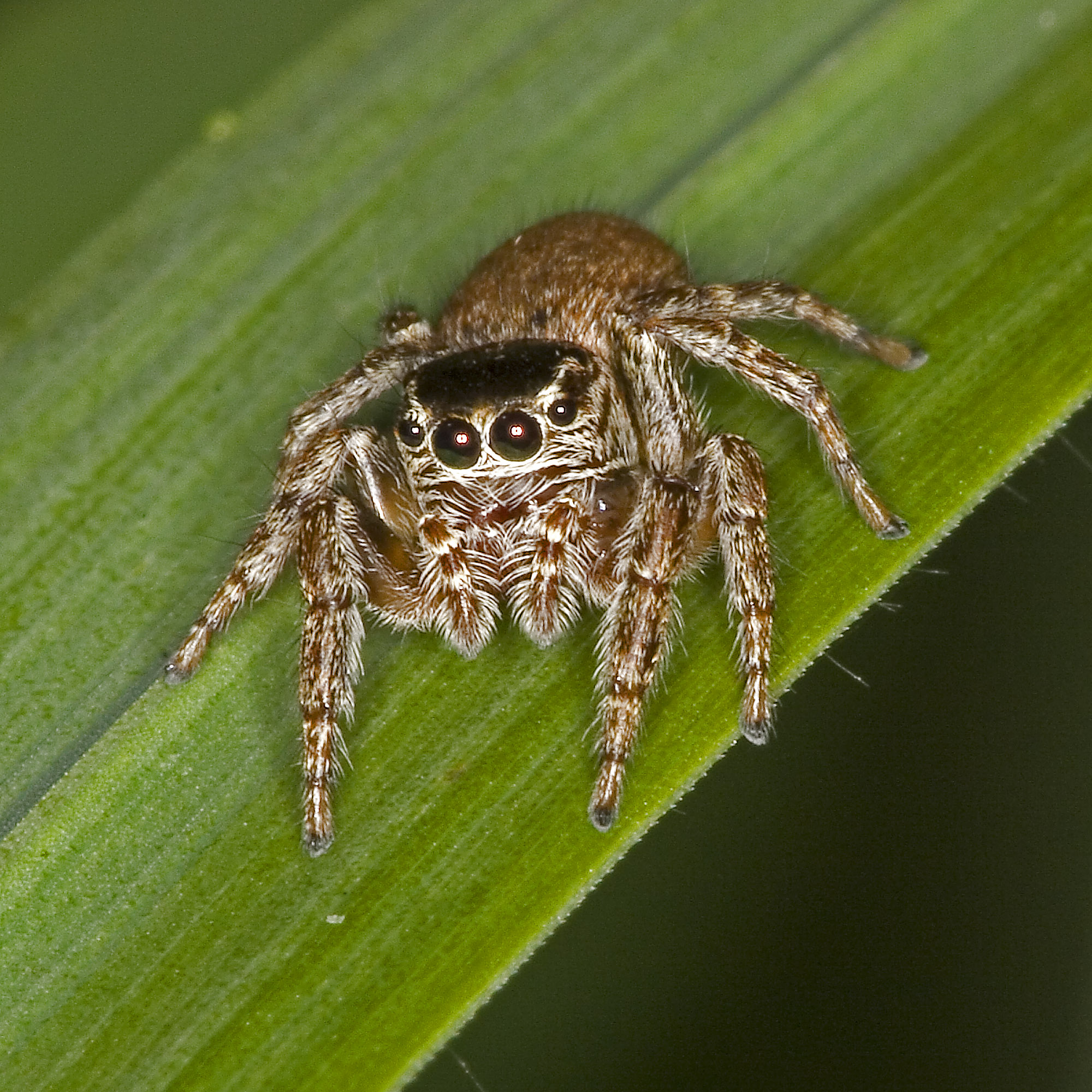
- Female
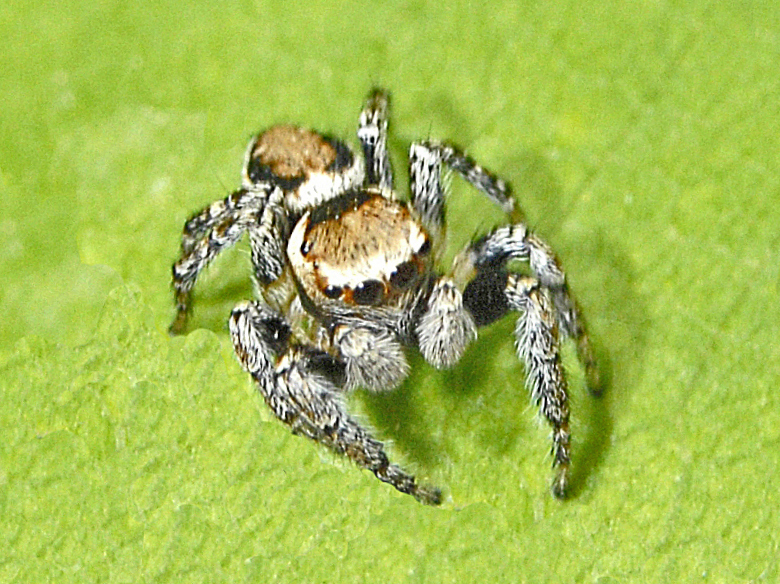
- Male

Scientific classification
- Kingdom: Animalia
- Phylum: Arthropoda
- Subphylum: Chelicerata
- Class: Arachnida
- Order: Araneae
- Infraorder: Araneomorphae
- Family: Salticidae
- Genus: Evarcha
- Species: E. falcata

Binomial name
- Evarcha falcata (Clerck, 1757)
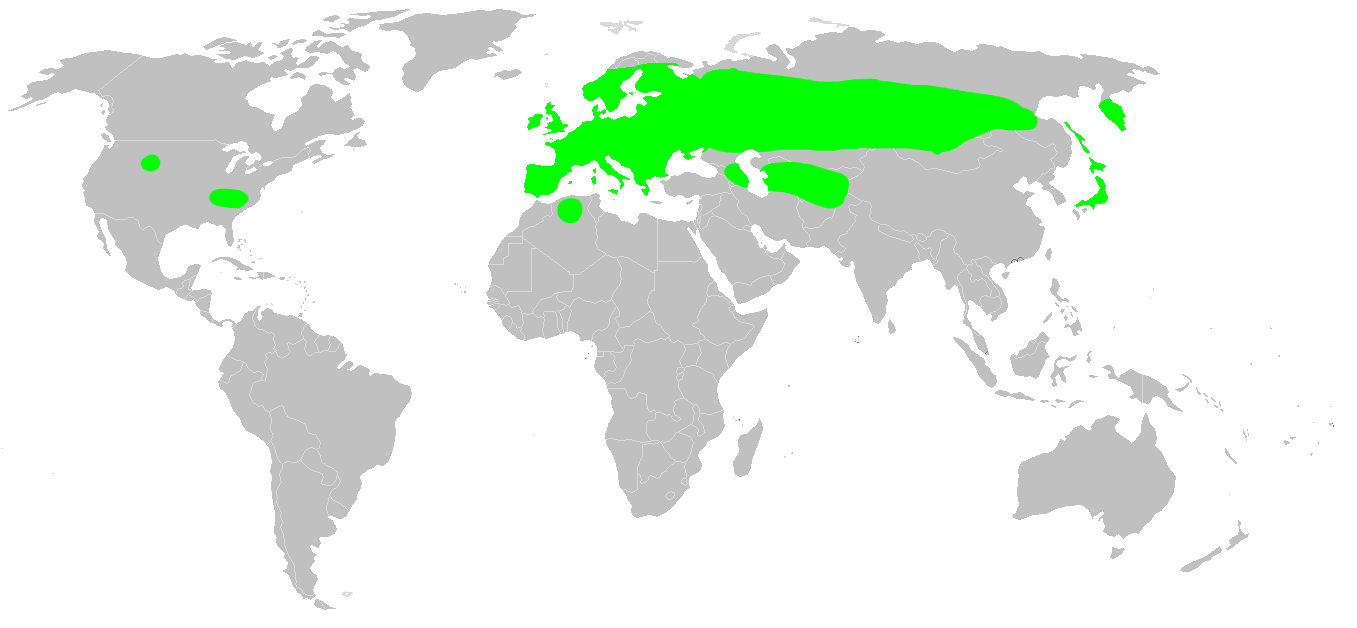

Synonyms
- List: Araneus falcatus; Aranea rupestris; Aranea blancardi; Aranea falcata; Aranea flammata; Aranea coronata; Attus coronatus; Attus capreolus; Salticus abietis; Salticus blancardi; Attus falcatus; Euophrys falcata; Salticus coronatus; Euophrys coronata; Attus taczanowskii; Attus napoleon; Attus arctuatus; Hasarius arctuatus; Hasarius falcatus; Ergane falcata; Evarcha flammata; Evarcha blancardi

= Evarcha falcata =

Species of spider

Evarcha falcata is a species of 'jumping spiders' belonging to the family Salticidae.

== Taxonomy ==
Evarca falcata (Clerk, 1757) is considered by some authors a complex of three sibling species - E. falcata s.str., Evarcha proszynskii Marusik & Logunov, 1998, Evarcha hoyi (Peckham & Peckham, 1883) - and their range is largely allopatric.

== Subspecies ==
One subspecies is currently recognised:

- Evarcha falcata xinglongensis Yang & Tang, 1996 (China)

A second Evarcha falcata nigrofusca (Strand, 1900) (Norway) was made a synonym by Breitling et al. 2016.

== Distribution ==
This species is present in the Palearctic realm, from Europe, Turkey, Caucasus, Afghanistan, and Russia to Kazakhstan and China.

== Habitat ==
These jumping spiders prefers dry habitats, especially the sunny edges of forests with dense vegetation, grass, shrubbery, clearings and sparse woodlands.

== Description ==
male

female variants

Evarcha falcata can reach approximately a body length of 5.0–7.7 millimetres (0.20–0.30 in) in females, while males are slightly shorter, reaching about 4.3–5.9 millimetres (0.17–0.23 in). In these medium sized spiders the upper side of the cephalothorax (prosoma) of the male is light brown in the anterior half, dark brown or black in the back half. Behind the eyes and at the sides of the cephalothorax there are wide, light beige, or white stripes. The center of the abdomen (opisthosoma) is light brown, framed by black and white stripes. The two central eyes of the face are rather large. The frontal area of the eyes is covered with light hairs. Also pedipalps are covered with longer, light hairs. Legs are light brown.

Females differ from males also in color (Sexual dimorphism). Cephalothorax and abdomen are densely covered with brown hairs, without any light or black stripes and spots. On the abdomen of the males there is sometimes an indistinct drawing of bright oblique spots, similarly to Evarcha arcuata , but the latter has longer white hairs on the face.

== Biology and behavior ==
Adult of both sexes can be found from March to November. They are diurnal jumping spiders with a good visual and hunting ability. These spiders hide mainly in the lower tier of vegetation. They move in the thick of the grass, looking for their prey. During mating the male climbs the female backwards and in this condition moves along with the female for a long time. Then the male moves down to the side and inserts the pedipalps into the external genital structure of the female (epigyne).

== Gallery ==
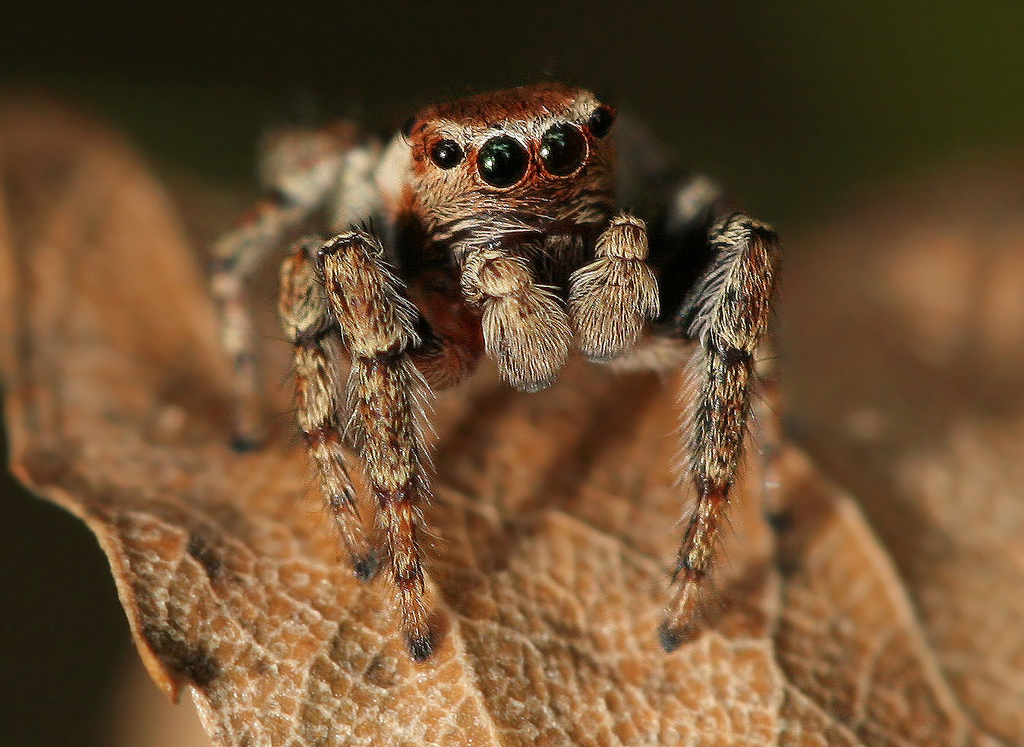
Male, front view

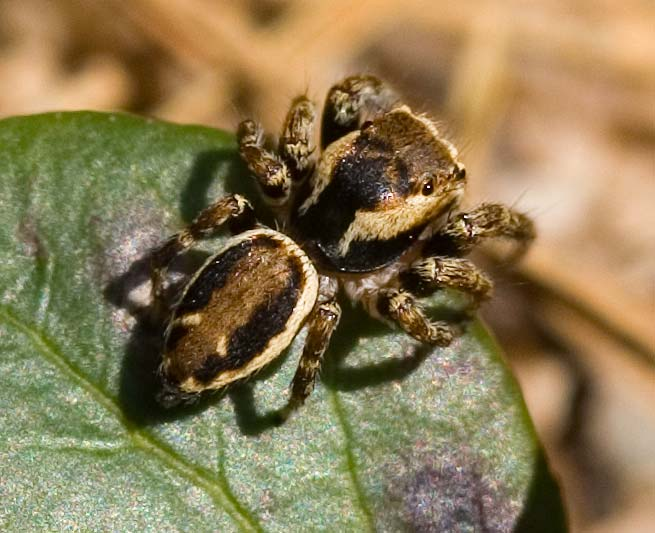
Male, dorsal view

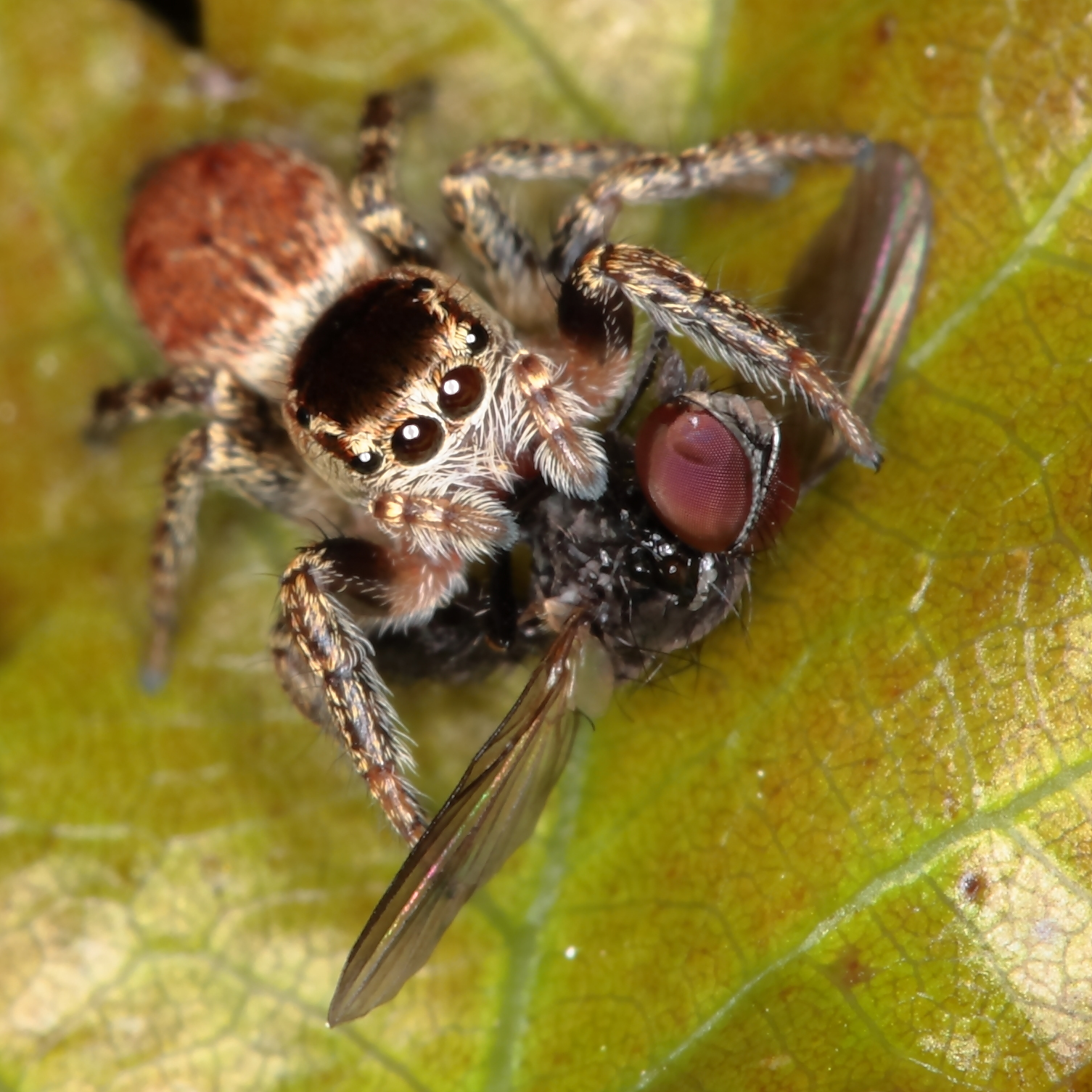
Female with prey

Video clip

== Bibliography ==
- Clerck, 1757 : Svenska spindlar, uti sina hufvud-slågter indelte samt under några och sextio särskildte arter beskrefne och med illuminerade figurer uplyste. Stockholmiae, p. 1-154.
- Heiko Bellmann: Kosmos-Atlas Spinnentiere Europas. = Spinnentiere Europas. 2. Auflage. Franckh-Kosmos, Stuttgart 2001, ISBN 3-440-09071-X
- Yang & Tang, 1996 : Three new species of family Salticidae from Gansu, China (Araneae). Journal of Lanzhou University Natural Sciences, vol. 32, p. 104-106.
