= E. armeniaca =

E. armeniaca may refer to:

- Eutypa armeniacae, a grape disease
- Evarcha armeniaca, a spider species in the genus Evarcha

== Synonyms ==
- Eria armeniaca, a synonym for Eria ornata, an orchid species

== See also ==
- Armeniaca (disambiguation)
