= Jucunda =

Jucunda may refer to:

- 948 Jucunda, a minor planet orbiting the Sun
- Bellamya jucunda, a species of gastropod in the family Viviparidae
- Evarcha jucunda, a species of jumping spider
- Ixora jucunda, a species of plant in the family Rubiaceae
- Odice jucunda, a moth of the family Noctuida
- Palpopleura jucunda, a species of dragonfly in family Libellulidae
