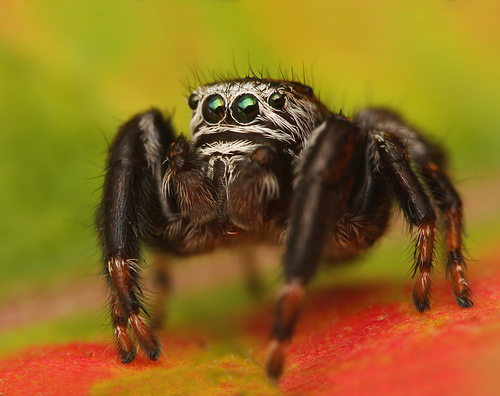
- The related Evarcha arcuata

Scientific classification
- Kingdom: Animalia
- Phylum: Arthropoda
- Subphylum: Chelicerata
- Class: Arachnida
- Order: Araneae
- Infraorder: Araneomorphae
- Family: Salticidae
- Genus: Evarcha
- Species: E. aposto

Binomial name
- Evarcha aposto Wesołowska & Tomasiewicz, 2008

= Evarcha aposto =

Species of spider

Evarcha aposto is a species of jumping spider in the genus Evarcha that lives in Ethiopia and Nigeria. The species was first described in 2008 by Wanda Wesołowska and Beata Tomasiewicz. It is named for the place in Ethiopia where it was first found. The spider is small, with a cephalothorax measuring between 1.9 and 2.2 mm (0.07 and 0.09 in) long and an abdomen between 1.8 and 1.9 mm (0.07 and 0.07 in) long. The carapace is generally light, yellow or fawn, with a dark stripe down the middle and occasionally a thin stripe to the rear. The abdomen is yellow with a pattern of darker patches. It has a black eye field. The front legs are darker, brown in the case of those found in Nigeria and black for the Ethiopian examples. The remaining legs have a distinctive top half that is black or brown, the remainder being yellow. Its copulatory organs are distinctive, particularly the male's very short embolus, which is accompanied by a spoon-like appendage. The female has not been described.

== Taxonomy ==
Evarcha aposto is a species of jumping spider that was first described by Wanda Wesołowska and Beata Tomasiewicz in 2008. It was one of over 500 species identified by the Polish arachnologist Wesołowska during her career, making her one of the most prolific in the field. Although they noted that other features could point to the spider being a member of Pellenes, they allocated it to the genus Evarcha on the basis of the structure of the pedipalps. Evarcha had been first circumscribed by Eugène Simon in 1902. The genus is one of the largest, with members found on four continents.

In 1976, Jerzy Prószyński placed the genus in the subfamily Pelleninae, along with the genera Bianor and Pellenes. In Wayne Maddison's 2015 study of spider phylogenetic classification, the genus Evarcha was moved to the subtribe Plexippina. This is a member of the tribe Plexippini, in the subclade Simonida, which itself lies within the clade Saltafresia. It is related to the genera Hyllus and Plexippus. Analysis of protein-coding genes showed it is particularly related to Telamonia. In the following year, Prószyński added the genus to a group of genera named Evarchines, named after the genus, along with Hasarinella and Nigorella based on similarities in the spiders' copulatory organs. The species is named for the place that was first found.

== Description ==
Evarcha aposto is a small spider. The spider's body is divided into two main parts: the cephalothorax and the abdomen. The male has a cephalothorax that is between 1.9 and 2.2 mm (0.07 and 0.09 in) long and 1.4 and 1.6 mm (0.06 and 0.06 in) wide. The spider's abdomen is between 1.8 and 1.9 mm (0.07 and 0.07 in) long and 1.2 and 1.4 mm (0.05 and 0.06 in) wide. The carapace, the hard upper part of the cephalothorax, is moderately high to high, with a gentle slope at the back. There is a significant variation between the spiders living in Ethiopia and Nigeria. The Ethiopian spiders have a brown patch in the middle of the black eye field. The eyes are also surrounded by yellowish scales and, occasionally, brown bristles. The spiders have an orange carapace with a dark band down the middle and a thin black line at the edge on the back. The underside, or sternum, is orange. The spiders' faces, or clypeus, are adorned with white hairs. Their mouthparts are light brown, apart from the chelicerae, which have yellow mouthparts with whitish edges. The spiders' abdomens are an elongated oval. The top of each abdomen is light yellow with a pattern consisting of two grey spots in the middle and a large brownish-grey patch on the rear. The sides are covered in white hairs and the underside is yellow with a hint of grey. The front legs are black with small amounts of yellow. The remaining legs are black at the top half and yellow for the bottom half. The pedipalps are generally yellow with black cymbium and tibia.

The spiders found in Nigeria are generally larger. They have a fawn carapace with a darker stripe down the middle. Some of the eyes are surrounded by black rings as well as bristles, and the eye field is generally more hairy. The clypeus is similar, as are the chelicerae and other mouthparts. The abdomen is again mainly yellow but differs in its pattern, which consists of large brownish-grey patches. Although there are hairs on the sides as in the spiders found in Ethiopia, they are longer and the top is also covered in short brown hairs. The underside of the abdomen is light with a hint of grey to the sides. The front legs are generally brown with touches of yellow. The remainder are yellow with patches like the Ethiopian examples but brown rather than black. The pedipalps again are yellow, but, in the same way as the legs, the areas that are black in the Ethiopian spiders are brown in the Nigerian examples.

The copulatory organs are distinctive and common between all examples described. The palpal bulb has a large lobe to the bottom. There is a very short delicate hooked embolus emanating from the top of the bulb that has an accompanying spoon-like appendage that overshadows it. The very short embolus is distinctive for the species. The palpal tibia has a short wide spike, or tibial apophysis. Both the tibia and the cymbium are hairy, the hairs on the tibia being particularly long. The female has not been described.

== Distribution and habitat ==
Evarcha spiders live across the world, although those found in North America may be accidental migrants. Although the genus is found across Africa, Evarcha aposto lives to Ethiopia and Nigeria. The holotype was found in the Aposto hot springs near Hawassa in the Sidama Region of Ethiopia in 1982. Other examples were also found locally. The first spider of the species to be identified in Nigeria was collected in Cross River State in 1984. The first examples were found amongst short grasses in a forest environment. Later, the spider was also found to live in fields of rice.
