= E. falcata =

E. falcata may refer to:

- Erythrina falcata, the Brazilian coral tree, a timber tree species native to Atlantic Forest vegetation in Brazil, Paraguay and Argentina
- Evarcha falcata, a jumping spider species with palaearctic distribution
