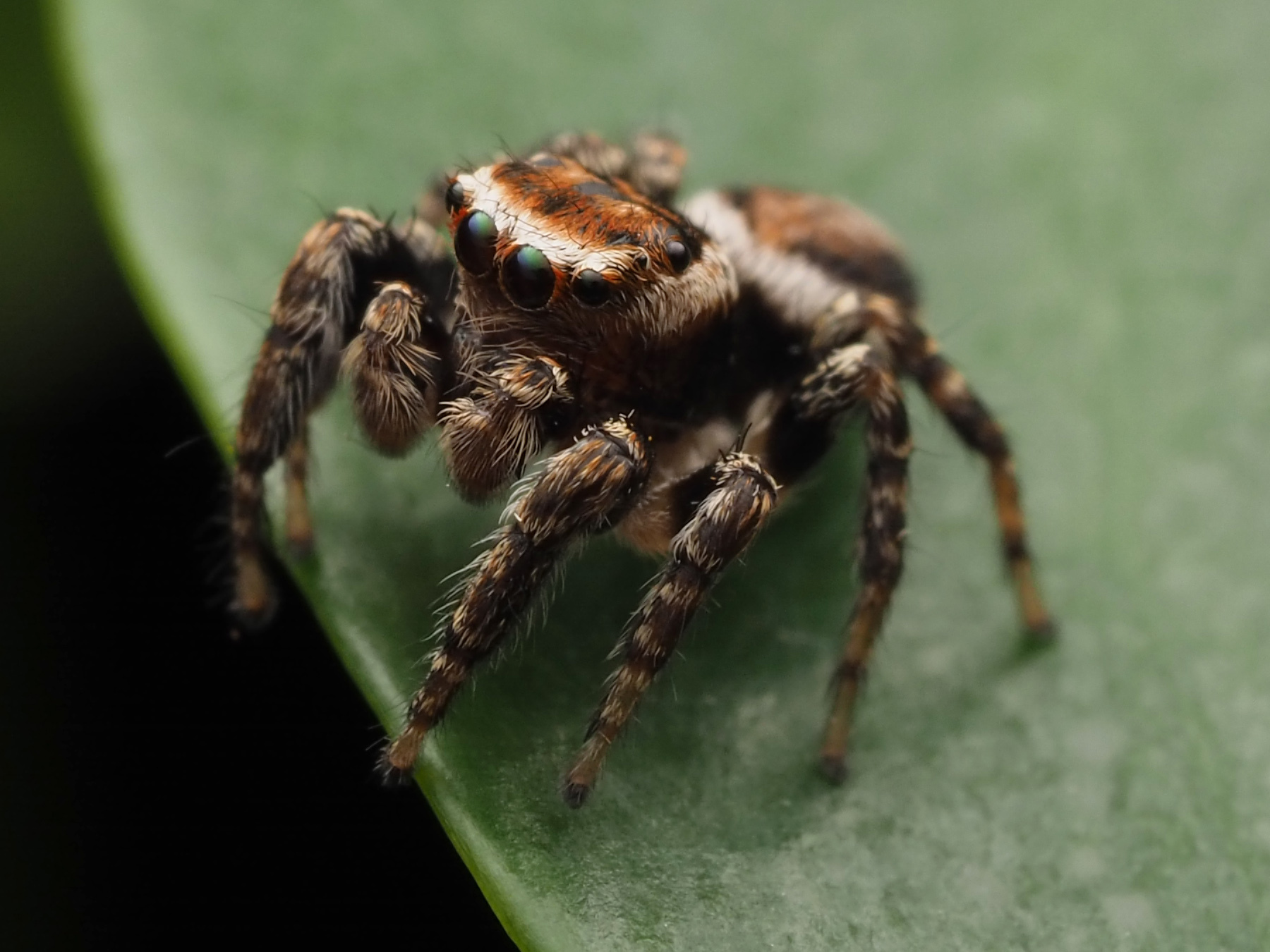
- The related Evarcha hoyi

Scientific classification
- Kingdom: Animalia
- Phylum: Arthropoda
- Subphylum: Chelicerata
- Class: Arachnida
- Order: Araneae
- Infraorder: Araneomorphae
- Family: Salticidae
- Genus: Evarcha
- Species: E. rotundibulbis

Binomial name
- Evarcha rotundibulbis Wesołowska & Tomasiewicz, 2008

= Evarcha rotundibulbis =

Species of spider

Evarcha rotundibulbis is a species of jumping spider in the genus Evarcha that lives in Ethiopia. The species was first described in 2008 by Wanda Wesołowska and Beata Tomasiewicz. The spider is small to medium-sized, with a cephalothorax measuring between 2.4 and 2.7 mm (0.09 and 0.11 in) long and an abdomen between 2.3 and 2.6 mm (0.09 and 0.10 in) long. The carapace is light brown with a dark brown eye field. The abdomen is russet with a yellowish pattern of arrows and spots. The spider has brown and yellow legs. Its copulatory organs are unusual and help identify it. The male has a distinctive rounded palpal bulb that is recalled in the name of the species. It also has a very short forked embolus and a shovel-like projection, or apophysis, on the palpal tibia that distinguishes it from other related species. The female has not been described.

== Taxonomy ==
Evarcha rotundibulbis is a species of jumping spider that was first described by Wanda Wesołowska and Beata Tomasiewicz in 2008. It was one of over 500 species identified by the Polish arachnologist Wesołowska during her career, making her one of the most prolific writers in the field. They allocated it to the genus Evarcha, first circumscribed by Eugène Simon in 1902. The genus is one of the largest genera of jumping spiders, with members found on four continents.

In 1976, Jerzy Prószyński placed the genus in the subfamily Pelleninae of the family Plexippoida, along with the genera Bianor and Pellenes. In Wayne Maddison's 2015 study of spider phylogenetic classification, the genus Evarcha was moved to the subtribe Plexippina. This is a member of the tribe Plexippini, in the subclade Simonida in the clade Saltafresia. It is closer to the genera Hyllus and Plexippus. Analysis of protein-coding genes showed it was particularly related to Telamonia. In the following year, Prószyński added the genus to a group of genera named Evarchines, named after the genus, along with Hasarinella and Nigorella based on similarities in the spiders' copulatory organs. The species is named for a Latin word that refers to the shape of the palpal bulb.

== Description ==
Evarcha rotundibulbis is a small to medium-sized with looks that are typical for the genus. The spider's body is divided into two main parts: a cephalothorax and an abdomen. The male has a cephalothorax that is between 2.4 and 2.7 mm (0.09 and 0.11 in) long and 1.7 and 2.2 mm (0.07 and 0.09 in) wide. The carapace, the hard upper part of the cephalothorax, is oval and rather high. It is light brown with a dark brown eye field. There are black rings around the eyes themselves. There is a scattering of white hairs on the thorax, and bristles and yellowish-grey scales near the eyes. The underside, or sternum, is orange although the edges are darker. The spider's face, or clypeus, is brown and very low. Externally, the spider's mouthparts, are generally dark brown, although the labium has white tips.

The spider's abdomen is similar in size to the carapace, measuring between 2.3 and 2.6 mm (0.09 and 0.10 in) in length and 1.6 and 1.8 mm (0.06 and 0.07 in) in width. It is russet on top with a yellowish pattern consisting of arrow shaped patches and four spots that mark the centre to form an irregular and intermittent line from the front to the back. The front edge is lighter. The whole surface has a scattering of long thin hairs, which are denser and thicker to the edges. The underside is dark grey with a hint of four lighter lines just visible. The spinnerets are yellow, the rearmost ones having yellow tips. The spider has mainly dark brown legs, but part of them, including the tarsi, yellow. The pedipalps are dark brown.

The spider has distinctive copulatory organs. The male has a wide projection from the palpal tibia called a tibial apophysis. It is shaped like a shovel with two claw-like teeth about halfway along and a smaller tooth at the end. The palpal bulb is rounded with a bulge sticking out of the bottom and a very short forked embolus. The tibia has very long hairs, with shorter hairs projecting from the palpal bulb itself. The copulatory organs help to distinguish the species from others in the genus. For example, compared to the related Evarcha chubbi, this species has a shorter embolus and more rounded palpal bulb. The female has not been described.

== Distribution and habitat ==
Evarcha spiders live across the world, although those found in North America may be accidental migrants. Although the genus is found across Africa, Evarcha rotundibulbis is endemic to Ethiopia. The holotype was found in near Hora Crater Lake, Debre Zeit, in 1987 at an altitude of 1,900 m (6,200 ft) above sea level. The spider lives amongst tall grass.
