= Evarcha villosa =

Hairy Evarcha jumping spider

Scientific classification
- Kingdom: Animalia
- Phylum: Arthropoda
- Subphylum: Chelicerata
- Class: Arachnida
- Order: Araneae
- Infraorder: Araneomorphae
- Family: Salticidae
- Genus: Evarcha
- Species: E. villosa

Binomial name
- Evarcha villosa Wesołowska & Haddad, 2018

Species of spider

Evarcha villosa is a species of spider in the family Salticidae. It is endemic to South Africa and is commonly known as the hairy Evarcha jumping spider.

== Distribution ==
Evarcha villosa is endemic to South Africa, where it is known from Free State and Northern Cape.

== Habitat and ecology ==
This species was collected in pitfall traps in thorny savanna at altitudes ranging from 1163 to 1225 m.

== Conservation ==
Evarcha villosa receives some protection in Witsand Nature Reserve.

== Taxonomy ==
Evarcha villosa was described in 2018 from Kuruman in Northern Cape. Only the male is known.
