= Evarcha bihastata =

Scientific classification
- Kingdom: Animalia
- Phylum: Arthropoda
- Subphylum: Chelicerata
- Class: Arachnida
- Order: Araneae
- Infraorder: Araneomorphae
- Family: Salticidae
- Genus: Evarcha
- Species: E. bihastata

Binomial name
- Evarcha bihastata Wesołowska & Russell-Smith, 2000

Synonyms
- Evawes bihastata (Wesołowska & Russell-Smith, 2000)

Species of jumping spider

Evarcha bihastata is a species of jumping spider in the genus Evarcha that lives in Tanzania. It specific name is derived from two Latin words that can be translated "double pike". The spider has a carapace, the hard upper part of its cephalothorax, that is between 1.9 and 2.2 mm (0.07 and 0.09 in) long and an abdomen that is between 1.9 and 2.1 mm (0.08 in) long. Its carapace is generally orange with a brown eye field. The abdomen has an indistinct brown pattern. The female is darker than the male. The male has distinctive copulatory organs with a double embolus and a notch at the end of the spike, or apophysis, on it palpal tibia. The shape of the latter helps distinguish the species from the otherwise similar Evarcha similis. The first examples of the spider were described in 2000 by Wanda Wesołowska and Anthony Russell-Smith.

== Taxonomy ==
Evarcha bihastata is a species of jumping spider, a member of the family Salticidae, that was first described by the arachnologists Wanda Wesołowska and Anthony Russell-Smith in 2000. Wesołowska and Russell-Smith allocated the species to the genus Evarcha, which had been first circumscribed by Simon in 1902. The genus is one of the largest, with members found on four continents. The species is named from two Latin words that means "double pike".

Evarcha is closely related to the genera Hyllus and Plexippus. Analysis of protein-coding genes showed it was particularly related to Telamonia. In 1976, Prószyński placed the genus Evarcha in the subfamily Pelleninae, along with the genera Bianor and Pellenes. In Wayne Maddison's 2015 study of spider phylogenetic classification, the genus Evarcha was moved to the subtribe Plexippina. Plexippina is a member of the tribe Plexippini, in the subclade Simonida in the clade Saltafresia. In 2018, Prószyński placed the spider in a new genus Evawes based on its copulatory organs and the way that they differ from other Evarcha spiders. The new genus name is a combination of Evacha and Wesołowska. This designation is not widely accepted and the species remains in the Evarcha genus in the World Spider Catalog.

== Description ==
Evarcha bihastata has a body is divided into two main parts, a cephalothorax and an abdomen. The male has a high carapace, the hard upper part of the cephalothorax, that is typically 1.9 mm (0.07 in) long and 1.5 mm (0.06 in) wide. It is rather high and is generally orange. The eye field is brown with brown bristles and white hairs around the eyes themselves. The underside of the cephalothorax, or sternum, is yellowish. The spider's clypeus is low. Its mouthparts, including the chelicerae, labium and maxillae are brown with white tips on the labium and maxillae.

The male spider's abdomen is narrower than its carapace, measuring typically 1.9 mm in length and 1.2 mm (0.05 in) in width. It is yellowish-white on top with an indistinct brown pattern. The underside is greyish. It has dark grey spinnerets and brown legs. The legs have yellow rings, brown hairs and brown spines. The pedipalps are light brown. The male copulatory organs are distinctive. The palpal tibia has long hairs and a short broad protrusion, or tibial apophysis, that has a shallow notch at its end. The bulbus is rounded with a large triangular node at the base. It has what looks like a double embolus, the forward appendage having a delicate membrane. The bulbus is narrower, and the tibial apophysis a different shape, to the otherwise similar Evarcha similis.

The female is larger and darker than the male. It has a carapace that is typically 2.2 mm (0.09 in) long and 1.7 mm (0.07 in) wide and an abdomen that is typically 2.1 mm (0.08 in) long and 1.6 mm (0.06 in) wide. The epigyne shows evidence of sclerotization. It has two pockets near the epigastric furrow, the indentation towards the rear of the epigyne. The copulatory openings lead to substantial insemination ducts. The spermathecae, or receptacles, have many chambers.

== Distribution ==
Evarcha spiders live across the world, although those found in North America may be accidental migrants. Evarcha bihastata is endemic to Tanzania. The holotype was discovered in 1995 in the Mkomazi National Park. It has only been found in the reserve.
