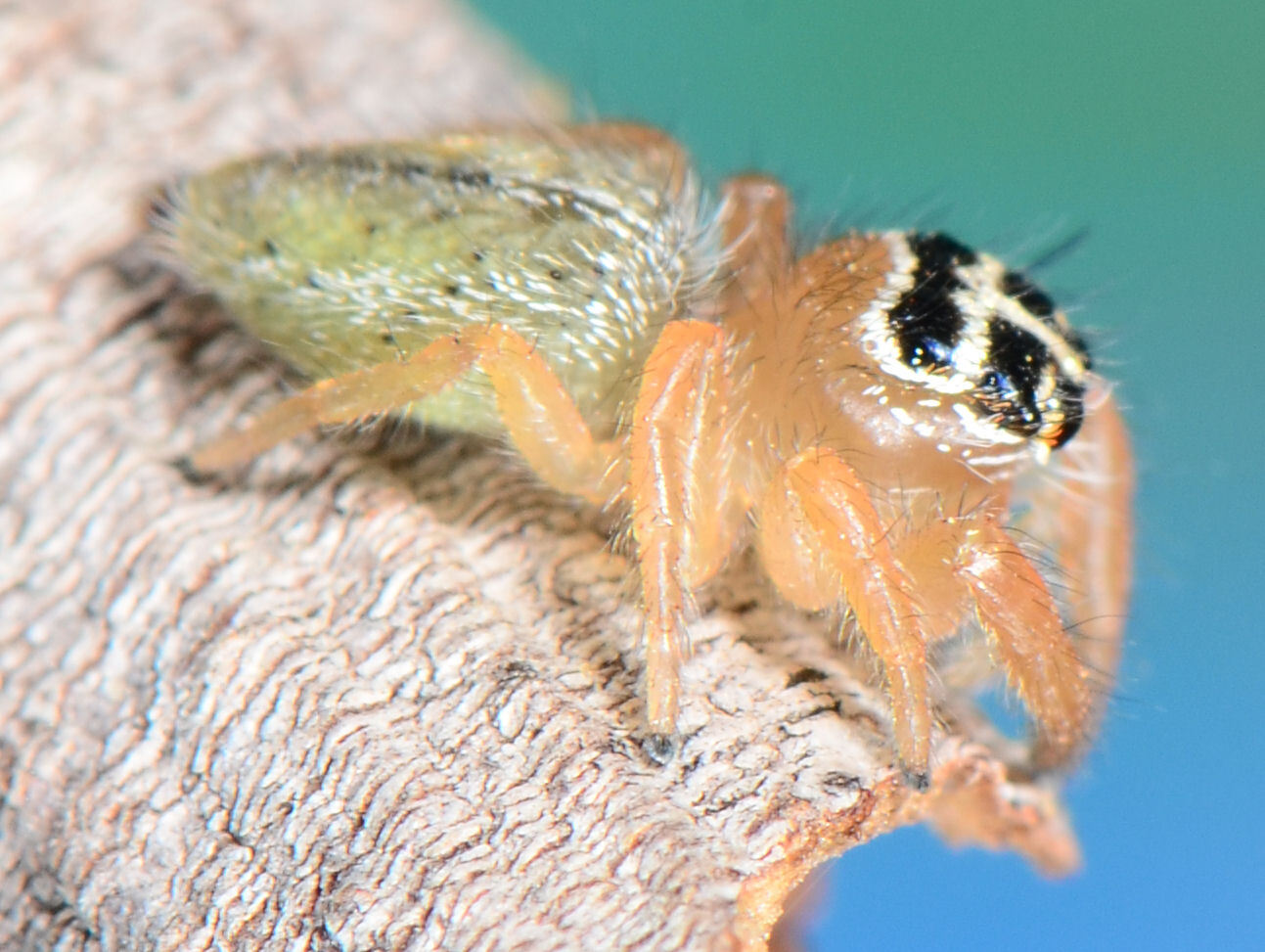

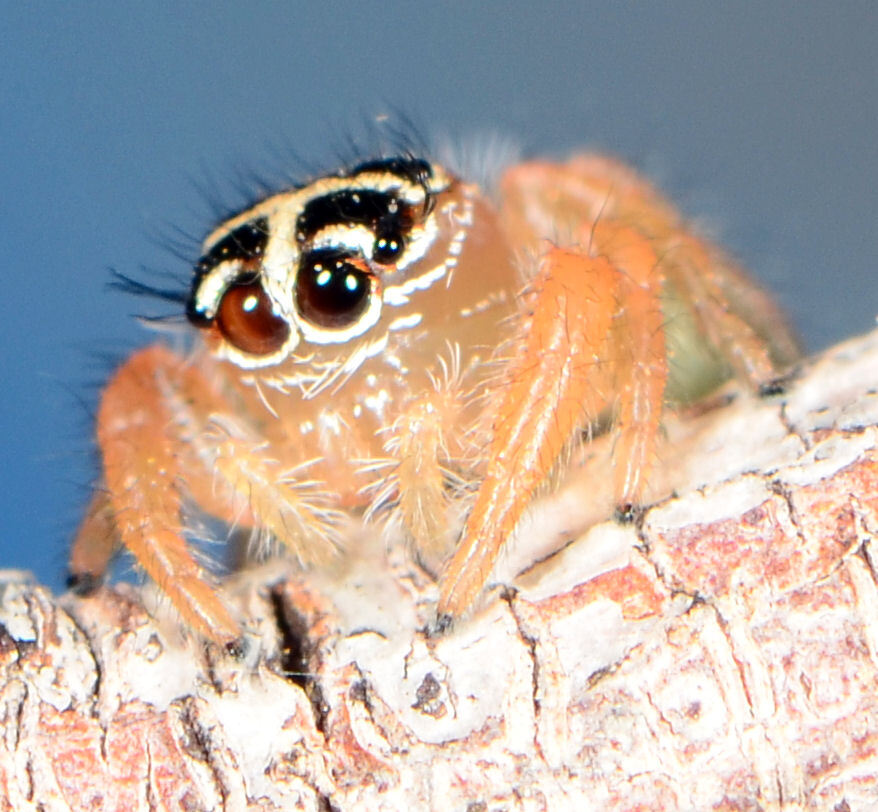

Scientific classification
- Kingdom: Animalia
- Phylum: Arthropoda
- Subphylum: Chelicerata
- Class: Arachnida
- Order: Araneae
- Infraorder: Araneomorphae
- Family: Salticidae
- Genus: Evarcha
- Species: E. alba

Binomial name
- Evarcha alba (Peckham & Peckham, 1903)

Synonyms
- Evarcha flagellaris Haddad & Wesołowska, 2011; Evacin flagellaris Prószyński, 2018

= Evarcha alba =

Pale Evarcha jumping spider

Species of spider

Evarcha alba is a species of spider in the family Salticidae. It is found in Zimbabwe and South Africa and is commonly known as the pale Evarcha jumping spider.

== Distribution ==
Evarcha alba is found in Zimbabwe and South Africa. In South Africa, it has been recorded from Free State, KwaZulu-Natal, Limpopo, and Mpumalanga.

== Habitat and ecology ==
Evarcha alba is a ground-dwelling species collected in pitfall traps in dense scrublands on the southern slope of a hillside in the Grassland Biome at altitudes of 414 m. It was also sampled from agroecosystems such as avocado and macadamia plantations.

== Description ==
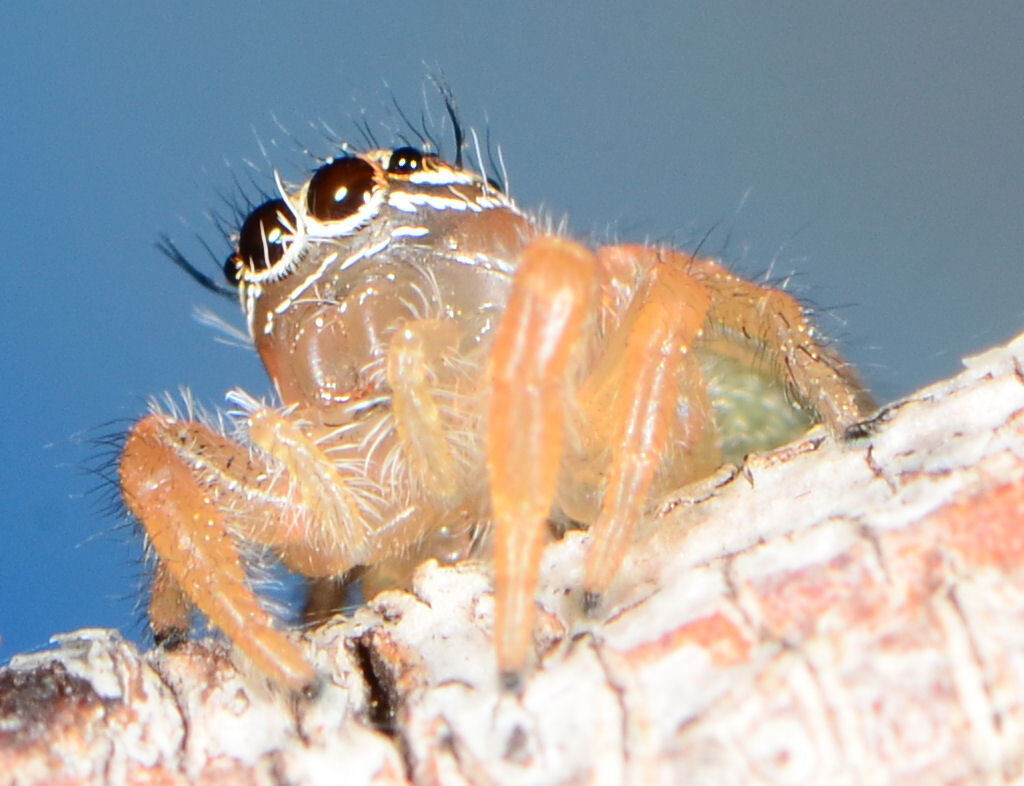
female

== Conservation ==
Evarcha alba receives some protection in the Amanzi Private Game Reserve and Lekgalameetse Nature Reserve.

== Taxonomy ==
The species was originally described as Viciria alba from Zimbabwe in 1903. The female was redescribed by Lessert in 1925. It was listed as Evacin alba by Prószyński and colleagues in 2018, although this classification has not been accepted. The male remains undescribed.
