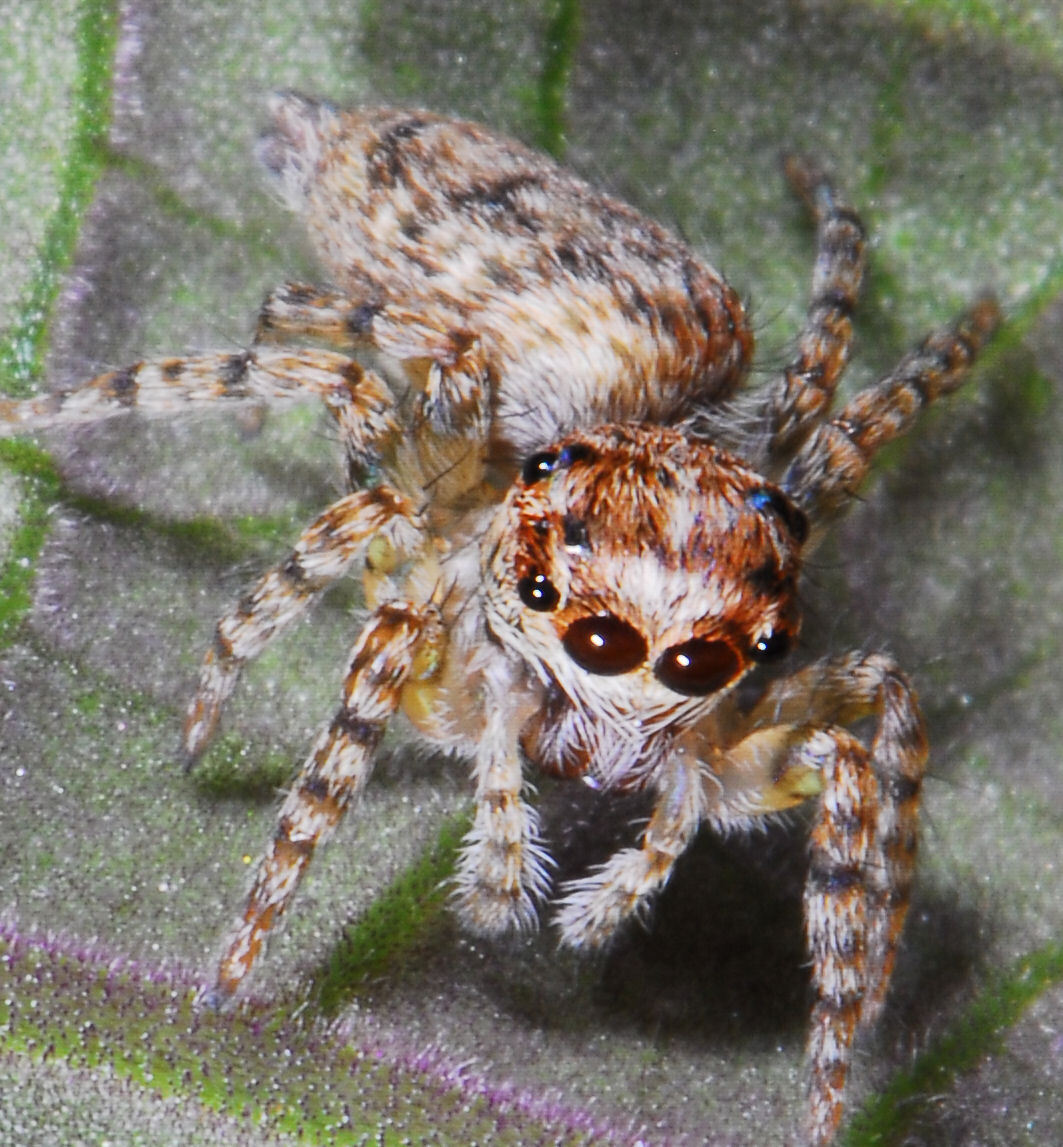
- female
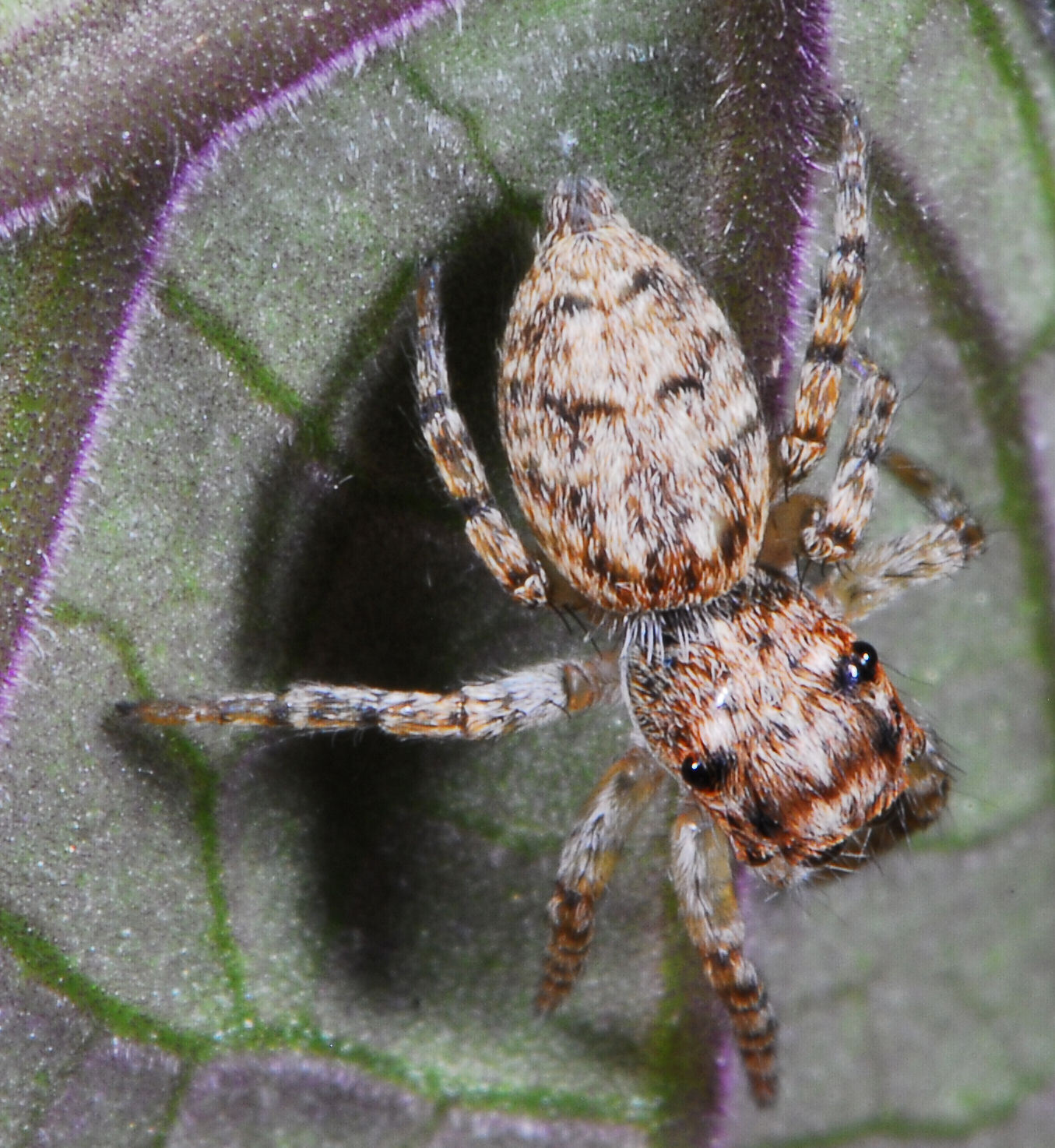
- female

Scientific classification
- Kingdom: Animalia
- Phylum: Arthropoda
- Subphylum: Chelicerata
- Class: Arachnida
- Order: Araneae
- Infraorder: Araneomorphae
- Family: Salticidae
- Genus: Evarcha
- Species: E. annae

Binomial name
- Evarcha annae (Peckham & Peckham, 1903)

Synonyms
- Evarcha flagellaris Haddad & Wesołowska, 2011; Evacin flagellaris Prószyński, 2018

= Evarcha annae =

Anna's Evarcha jumping spider

Species of spider

Evarcha annae is a species of spider in the family Salticidae. It is endemic to South Africa and is commonly known as Anna's Evarcha jumping spider.

== Distribution ==
Evarcha annae is endemic to South Africa, where it is known from Eastern Cape, KwaZulu-Natal, and Western Cape.

== Habitat and ecology ==
Evarcha annae was sampled from leaf litter in the Fynbos and Savanna biomes at altitudes ranging from 6 to 1552 m.

== Description ==
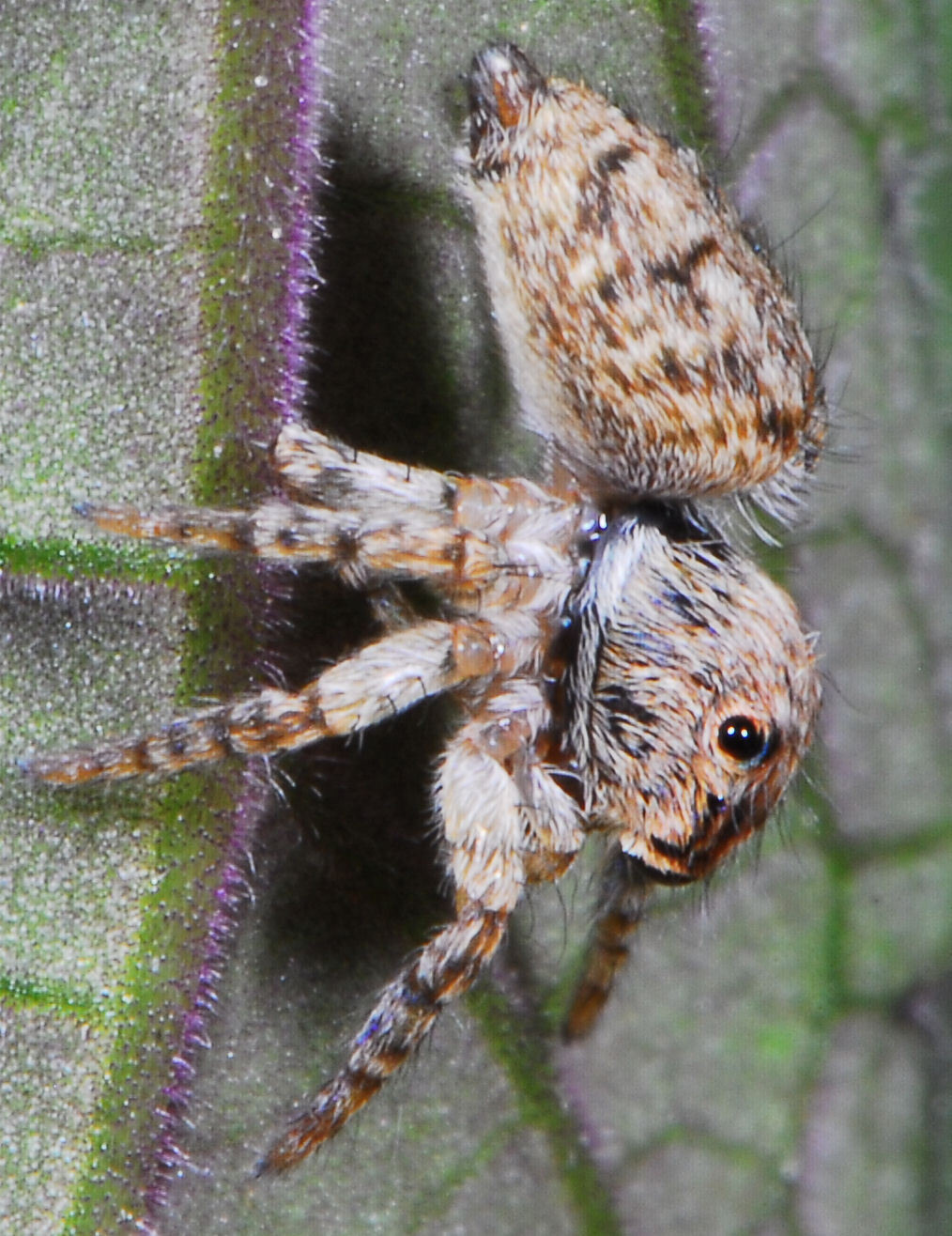
female

== Conservation ==
Evarcha annae is protected in Ndumo Game Reserve, Tembe Elephant Park, Cederberg Wilderness Area, and Table Mountain National Park.

== Taxonomy ==
The species was originally described as Habrocestum annae from Durban in 1903. It was redescribed by Wesołowska and Haddad in 2009 and transferred to Evarcha. Only females are known, and the species is likely conspecific with one of the southern African species known only from males.
