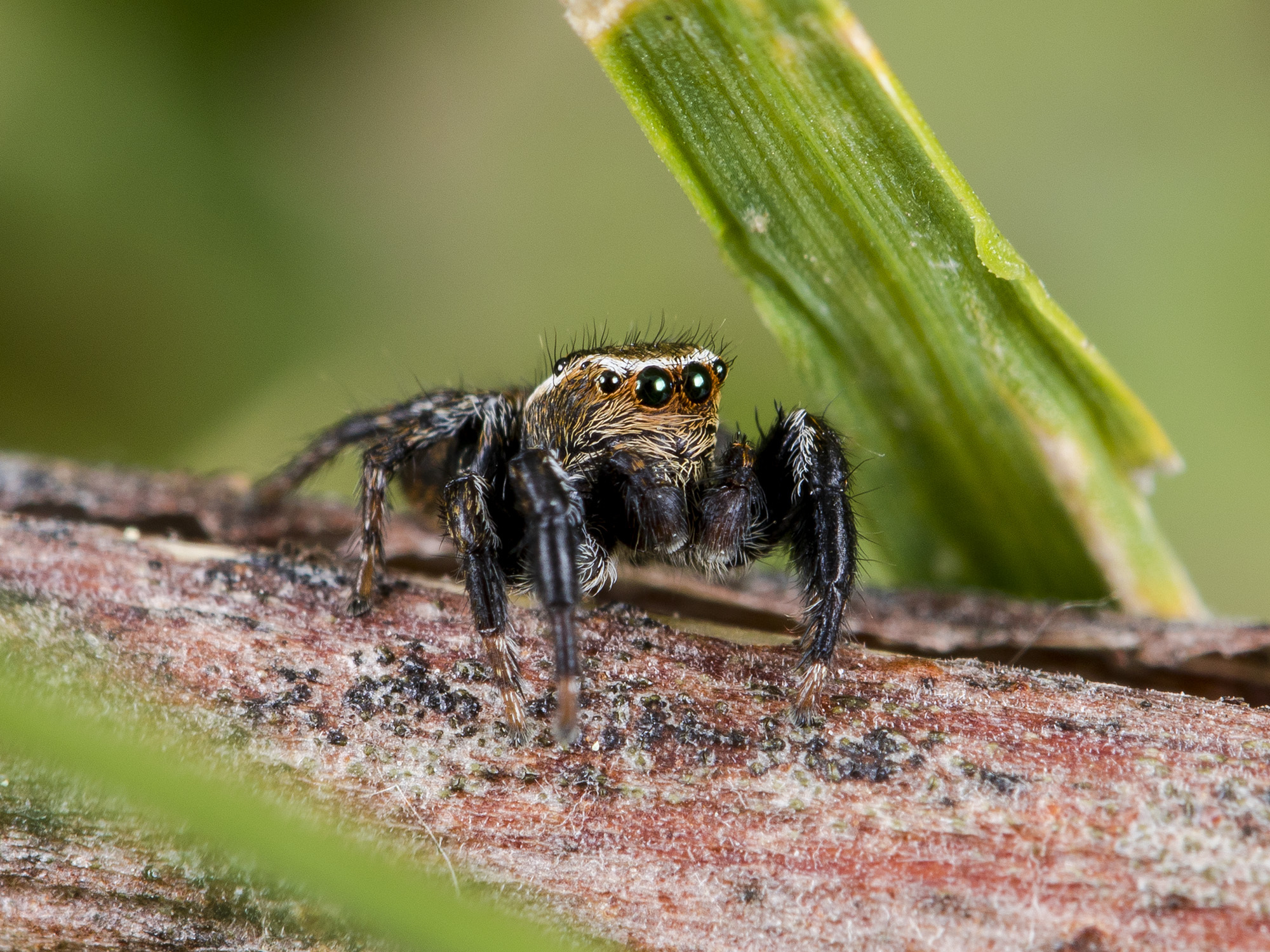
- The related Evarcha michailovi

Scientific classification
- Kingdom: Animalia
- Phylum: Arthropoda
- Subphylum: Chelicerata
- Class: Arachnida
- Order: Araneae
- Infraorder: Araneomorphae
- Family: Salticidae
- Genus: Evarcha
- Species: E. improcera

Binomial name
- Evarcha improcera Wesołowska & van Harten, 2007

= Evarcha improcera =

Species of spider

Evarcha improcera is a species of jumping spider in the genus Evarcha that is endemic to Yemen. The species was first described in 2007 by Wanda Wesołowska and Antonius van Harten. Only the female has been described. The spider is small, with a broad carapace that measures typically 2.2 mm (0.09 in) long and a narrower oval abdomen that is typically 1.8 mm (0.07 in) long. The spider has a whiteish-yellow pattern on its otherwise brown abdomen, which consists of a large patch at the front, a stripe down the middle that meets another stripe in a cross shape, the bottom arm of which consists of a series of closely tessellating wide chevrons. The species can be distinguished from others in the genus by its copulatory organs, particularly its small bean-like spermathecae, or receptacles, and the position of its accessory glands.

== Taxonomy ==
Evarcha improcera is a species of jumping spider that was first described by Wanda Wesołowska and Antonius van Harten in 2007. They allocated it to the genus Evarcha, first circumscribed by Eugène Simon in 1902. It was one of over 500 species identified by the Polish arachnologist Wesołowska during her career, more than any other contemporary writer and second only to Simon. The genus is one of the largest, with members found on four continents. The species is named for a Latin word that can be translated "inconspicuous", and recalls the small size of the spider.

In 1976, Jerzy Prószyński placed the genus Evarcha in the subfamily Pelleninae, along with the genera Bianor and Pellenes. In Wayne Maddison's 2015 study of spider phylogenetic classification, the genus Evarcha was moved to the subtribe Plexippina. This is a member of the tribe Plexippini, in the subclade Simonida in the clade Saltafresia. It is closely related to the genera Hyllus and Plexippus. Analysis of protein-coding genes showed it was particularly related to Telamonia. In the following year, Prószyński added the genus to a group of genera named Evarchines, named after the genus, along with Hasarinella and Nigorella based on similarities in the spiders' copulatory organs.

== Description ==
Evarcha improcera is a small spider with a body divided into two main parts: cephalothorax and an abdomen. The female has a rather high and broad carapace, the hard upper part of the cephalothorax, that is typically 2.2 mm (0.09 in) long and 1.6 mm (0.06 in) wide. It is brownish-orange, scattered with fawn hairs, with a darker eye field. There are brown hairs and dark rings around the eyes themselves. The underside of the cephalothorax, or sternum, is yellowish. The spider's face, or clypeus, is yellow with a covering of light long hairs. The fawn chelicerae form part of the mouthparts, which also include yellowish labium and maxillae.

The female spider's oval abdomen is narrower than the carapace. It measures typically 1.8 mm (0.07 in) in length and 1.2 mm (0.05 in) in width. The top is generally dark brown with a whiteish-yellow pattern, which consists of a large patch at the front, a stripe down the middle that meets another stripe in a cross shape, the bottom arm of which consists of a series of closely tessellating wide chevrons, and small spots on the sides. The underside is light. The spider has brown spinnerets. Its legs are light yellow with long brown spines and a few brown hairs.

The spider has distinctive copulatory organs. The female has a large depression in the middle of its epigyne. The copulatory openings are mounted to the back and lead to simple insemination ducts. The spermathecae, or receptacles, are small and shaped like beans. The accessory glands are unusually positioned. This, and the size of the spermathecae are distinguishing features of the species. The male has not been described.

== Distribution ==
Evarcha spiders live across the world, although those found in North America may be accidental migrants. Evarcha improcera is endemic to Yemen. The female holotype was discovered in 1999 near Taiz.
