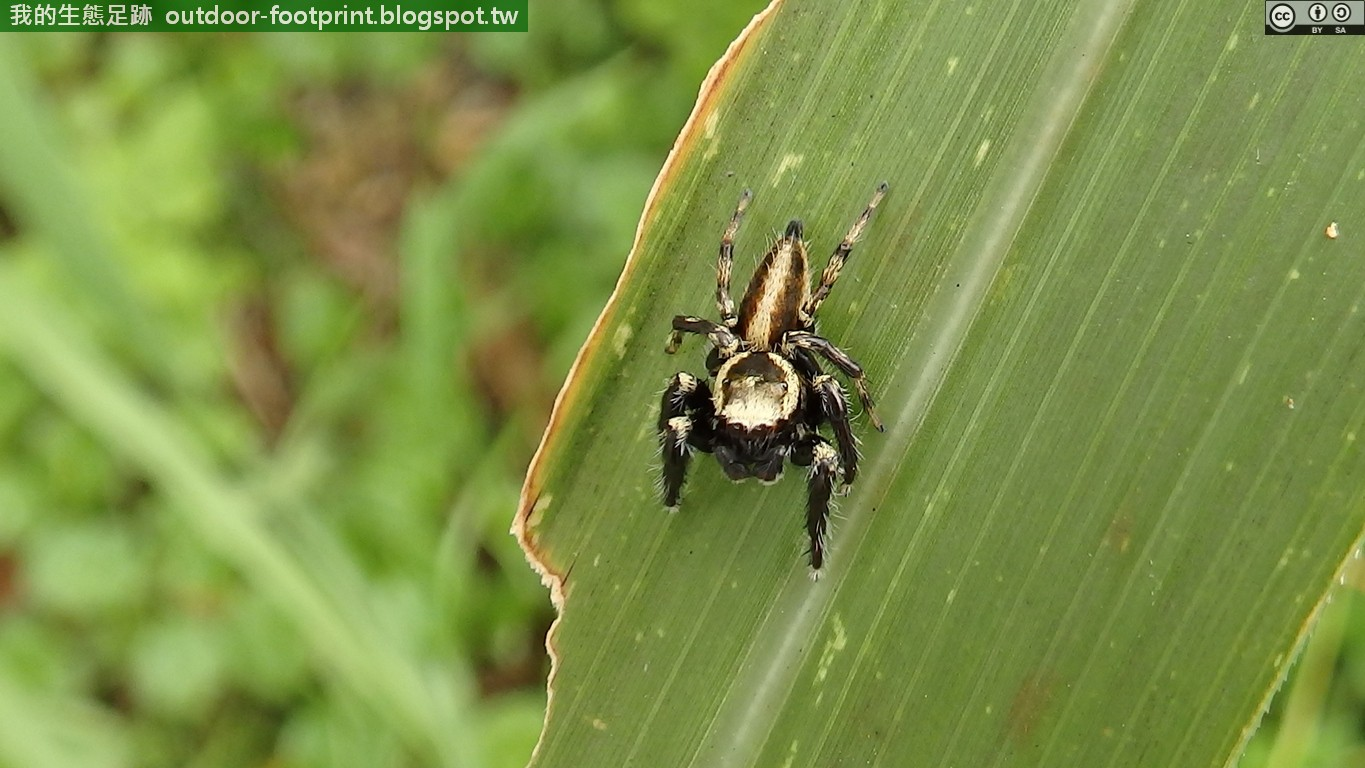
- Male

Scientific classification
- Kingdom: Animalia
- Phylum: Arthropoda
- Subphylum: Chelicerata
- Class: Arachnida
- Order: Araneae
- Infraorder: Araneomorphae
- Family: Salticidae
- Genus: Evarcha
- Species: E. flavocincta

Binomial name
- Evarcha flavocincta (C. L. Koch, 1846)

Synonyms
- Maevia flavocincta C. L. Koch, 1846; Salticus andamanius Tikader, 1977; Evarcha pococki Żabka, 1985; Menemerus albocinctus Keyserling, 1890; Evarcha fischeri (Bösenberg & Strand, 1906); Evarcha heteropogon Simon, 1903; Evarcha simonis (Thorell, 1892)

= Evarcha flavocincta =

- Female

Species of jumping spider

Evarcha flavocincta is a species of jumping spider in the genus Evarcha that lives in Asia. The species was first described in 1846 by C. L. Koch.

The species is characterized by its compact body, relatively short legs, and large anterior median eyes, which provide excellent vision. The species exhibits a color pattern with distinctive markings, including yellowish bands or patches, which contribute to its specific epithet "flavocincta" (meaning "yellow-banded"). Sexual dimorphism is observed, with males and females differing in size and coloration.

== Distribution and habitat ==
This species is known to inhabit regions of Asia including India, Bhutan, Myanmar, China, Taiwan, Japan, Vietnam, Singapore, Indonesia (Bintang Is.) and particularly Sri Lanka.

The species typically prefers forested environments and shrublands where it can effectively hunt prey using its keen vision and jumping ability.

== Behaviour and ecology ==
As a member of the Salticidae family, Evarcha flavocincta is an active predator that relies on its vision rather than web-building to capture prey. It primarily feeds on small insects and other arthropods.

These spiders are diurnal and exhibit complex courtship behaviors involving visual and vibratory signals.

== Conservation status ==
There are no significant conservation concerns currently associated with this species, but habitat destruction may impact its population in the future.
