= Evarcha zimbabwensis =

Scientific classification
- Kingdom: Animalia
- Phylum: Arthropoda
- Subphylum: Chelicerata
- Class: Arachnida
- Order: Araneae
- Infraorder: Araneomorphae
- Family: Salticidae
- Genus: Evarcha
- Species: E. zimbabwensis

Binomial name
- Evarcha zimbabwensis Wesołowska & Cumming, 2008

Synonyms
- Evawes zimbabwensis (Wesołowska & Cumming, 2008)

Species of jumping spider

Evarcha zimbabwensis is a species of jumping spider in the genus Evarcha that lives in South Africa and Zimbabwe. Its specific name is derived from the place where it was first found. The spider has a carapace, the hard upper part of the cephalothorax, that is between 2.3 and 2.7 mm (0.09 and 0.11 in) long and an abdomen. that is between 2.3 and 2.6 mm (0.10 in) long. Its carapace is generally brownish with a darker eye field. The abdomen has a light brown pattern on a greyish-brown background. The male has distinctive copulatory organs with a long thin embolus and a forked the end to the spike, or apophysis, on its palpal tibia. The shape of the latter helps distinguish the species from the otherwise similar similar Evarcha patagiata. The first examples of the spider were described in 2008 by Wanda Wesołowska and Meg Cumming.

== Taxonomy ==
Evarcha zimbabwensis is a species of jumping spider, a member of the family Salticidae, that was first described by the arachnologists Wanda Wesołowska and Meg Cumming in 2008. The species is named after the place it was first found.

Wesołowska and Cumming allocated the species to the genus Evarcha, which had been first circumscribed by Simon in 1902. The genus is one of the largest, with members found on four continents. It is closely related to the genera Hyllus and Plexippus. Analysis of protein-coding genes showed it was particularly related to Telamonia. In 1976, Prószyński placed the genus Evarcha in the subfamily Pelleninae, along with the genera Bianor and Pellenes. In Wayne Maddison's 2015 study of spider phylogenetic classification, the genus Evarcha was moved to the subtribe Plexippina. Plexippina is a member of the tribe Plexippini, in the subclade Simonida in the clade Saltafresia. In 2018, Prószyński placed the spider in a new genus named Evawes based on its copulatory organs and the way that they differ from other Evarcha spiders. The new genus name is a combination of Evacha and Wesołowska. This designation is not widely accepted and the species remains in the Evarcha genus in the World Spider Catalog.

== Description ==
Evarcha zimbabwensis has a body that is divided into two main parts: a cephalothorax and an abdomen. The male has a high carapace, the hard upper part of the cephalothorax, that is between 2.3 and 2.7 mm (0.09 and 0.11 in) long and between 1.8 and 2.1 mm (0.07 and 0.08 in) wide. It is high and brownish with darker edges. The eye field is dark brown with a scattering of fawn hairs on it and slightly lighter areas towards the front. There are black areas and small fawn scales around the eyes themselves. There are brown hairs on the thorax. The underside of the cephalothorax, or sternum, is yellow. The spider's face, or clypeus, is dark brown as are its mouthparts, including the chelicerae, labium and maxillae.

The male spider's abdomen is narrower than its carapace, measuring between 2.3 and 2.6 mm (0.10 in) mm in length and 1.5 and 1.9 mm (0.06 and 0.07 in) in width. It is greyish-brown on top with a lighter pattern and has a covering of brown and greyish hairs. The underside is darker. It has greyish-brown spinnerets. The spider's legs are mainly dark brown with brown leg hairs and spines. There are orange sections on the foremost legs and yellow parts on the others.

The pedipalps are brown with a covering of dense white hairs. The male copulatory organs are distinctive. The cymbium is rounded and convex. The palpal bulb is similar in size but has a large bulbous end. A long thin embolus projects from near the base of the palpal bulb, curves around the bulb and projects out near the top. The palpal tibia has a short broad protrusion, or tibial apophysis, that has a small fork-like end. The copulatory organs are similar to the related Evarcha patagiata but the tibial apophysis has a different end.

== Distribution and habitat ==
Evarcha spiders live across the world, although those found in North America may be accidental migrants. Evarcha zimbabwensis has been found in South Africa and Zimbabwe. The holotype was discovered in 2005. The spider was first seen in Zimbabwe but was later discovered lining in the Silaka Nature Reserve in South Africa. It is ground-dwelling and lives in coastal forests.
