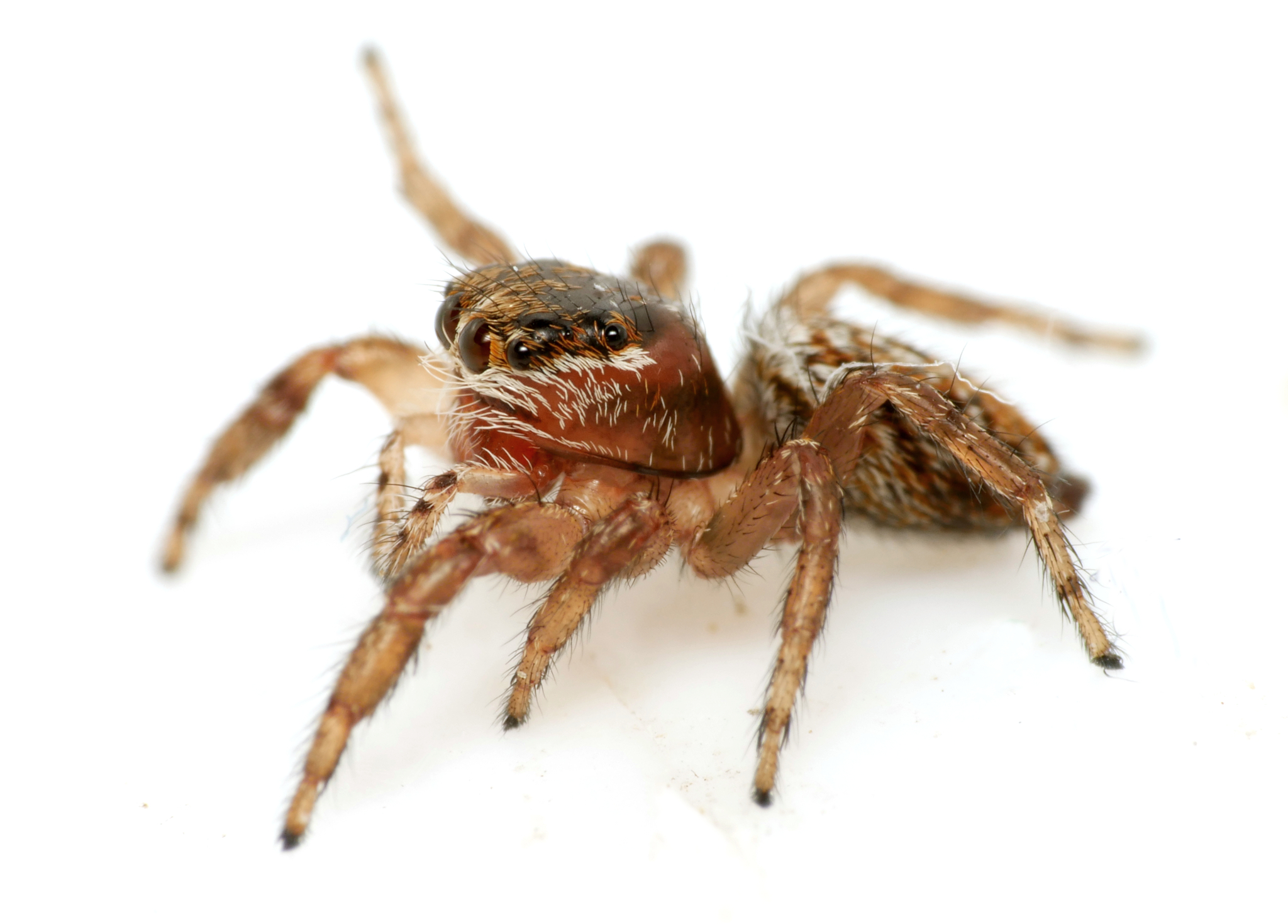
- Female from Denmark
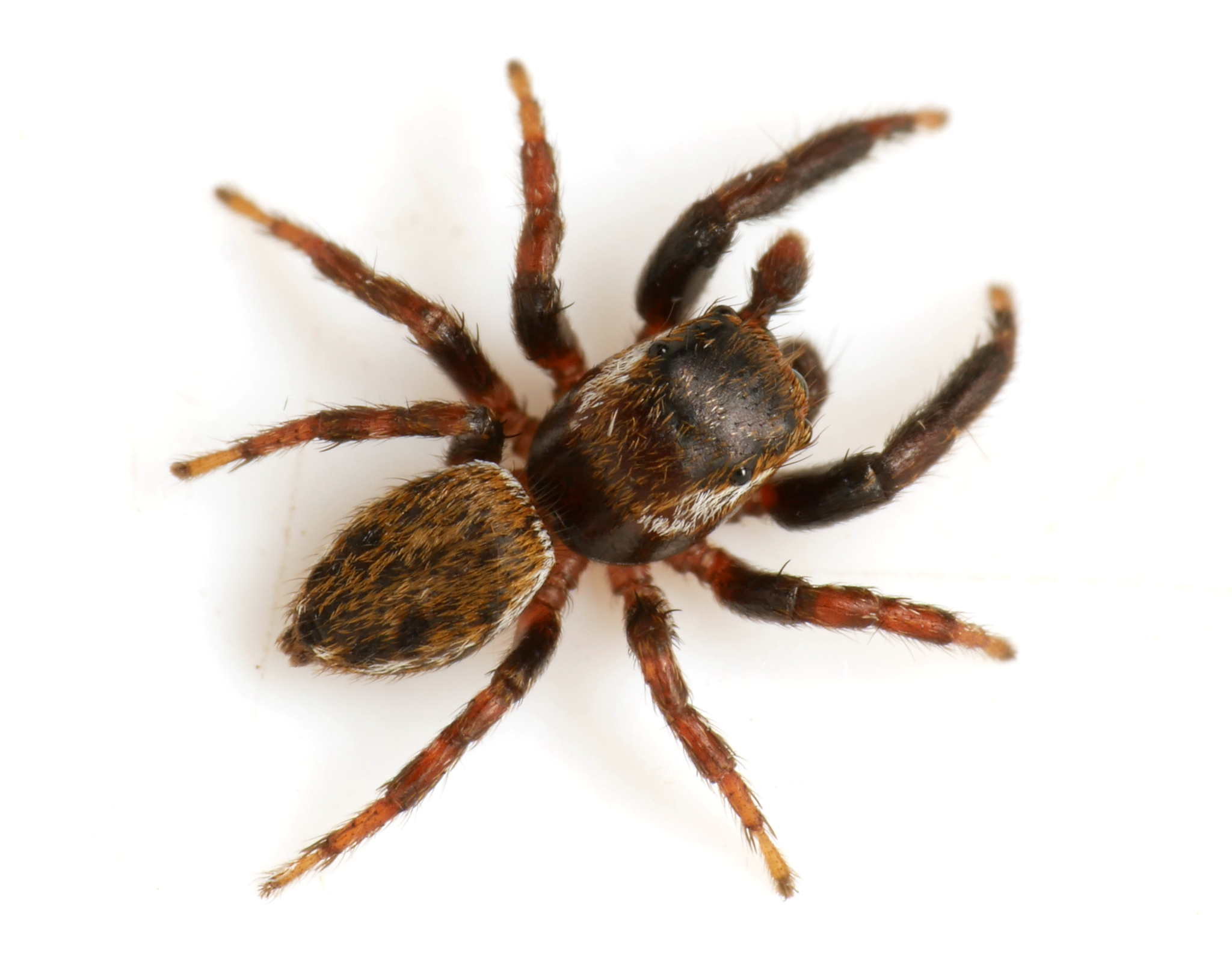
- Male from Denmark

Scientific classification
- Kingdom: Animalia
- Phylum: Arthropoda
- Subphylum: Chelicerata
- Class: Arachnida
- Order: Araneae
- Infraorder: Araneomorphae
- Family: Salticidae
- Genus: Evarcha
- Species: E. laetabunda

Binomial name
- Evarcha laetabunda (C. L. Koch, 1846)

Synonyms
- Euophrys laetabunda C. L. Koch, 1846; Attus laetabundus Simon, 1868; Hasarius laetabundus (Simon, 1876); Ergane laetabunda (Chyzer & Kulczyński, 1891)

= Evarcha laetabunda =

Species of jumping spider

Evarcha laetabunda is a species of jumping spider of the genus Evarcha. It is widely distributed across Europe, extending into North Africa, Turkey, the Caucasus, Russia (from Europe to the Far East), Kazakhstan, and China.

== Etymology ==
The specific name laetabunda is derived from Latin meaning "joyful" or "rejoicing," possibly referring to the spider's active behavior or vibrant coloration.

== Distribution ==
E. laetabunda has been recorded from across Europe, North Africa, Turkey, the Caucasus region, Russia (from European parts to the Far East), Kazakhstan, and China. Recent records have confirmed its presence in the Netherlands.

== Description ==
female

variant female

male

Evarcha laetabunda is a medium-sized jumping spider with distinct sexual dimorphism in coloration and pattern. The original description by Koch in 1846 provides detailed morphological characteristics of both sexes.

The male has a predominantly black cephalothorax with a brownish-yellow frontal plate and white stripes on the sides below the eyes. The opisthosoma is brownish-yellow above and black below, with a white arched stripe around the dorsal area. The legs are black with yellow heels and tarsi, the latter having black rings. The pedipalps are brownish-black with dark brown terminal segments and black genitalia.

The female has a similar cephalothorax to the male, with an arched white stripe at the back of the head. The opisthosoma is black with an anterior arched stripe and several white arched stripes on the posterior part forming curved patterns. Between these stripes are small rust-colored moon-shaped spots. The underside is black with two indistinct gray longitudinal stripes. The legs and tarsi are yellow, with brown to black markings on the leg segments.

Males reach approximately 4.5 mm in body length, while females reach about 6 mm.

== Habitat ==
E. laetabunda inhabits various terrestrial environments and is often found in open areas with vegetation. The species is active during warmer months and constructs silken retreats under stones and in vegetation.
