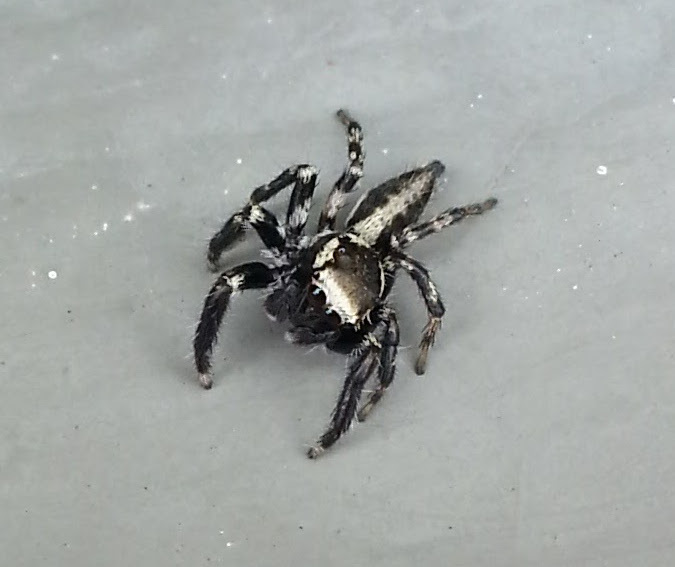
- male from Hong Kong

Scientific classification
- Kingdom: Animalia
- Phylum: Arthropoda
- Subphylum: Chelicerata
- Class: Arachnida
- Order: Araneae
- Infraorder: Araneomorphae
- Family: Salticidae
- Genus: Evarcha
- Species: E. bulbosa

Binomial name
- Evarcha bulbosa Żabka, 1985

= Evarcha bulbosa =

Species of spider

Evarcha bulbosa is a species of jumping spider in the genus Evarcha. It was first described by Marek Żabka in 1985 from specimens collected in Vietnam. The species is distributed across several Asian countries including China, Taiwan, Thailand, and Vietnam.

== Distribution ==
E. bulbosa has been recorded from China, Taiwan, Thailand, and Vietnam. The holotype was collected from Ta Pinh in the Sa Pa district of Lao Cai Province, Vietnam, at an elevation of 1,400 meters.

== Description ==
Only the male of E. bulbosa is known; the female remains undescribed. The male has a distinctive appearance with a black-brown eye field bordered by a dark-orange fringe covered with white flattened hairs. The cephalothorax is brown with grey and dark brown hairs and bristles, while the front also bears white hairs.

The abdomen is brown to dark grey, becoming darker towards the rear, with traces of an orange median stripe and rows of yellow and orange spots. The species can be distinguished by its split tibial apophysis and the exceptionally broad bulbus of the male palpal organ, which lacks a depression on its surface.

The legs show distinctive coloration, with the first pair having yellow-orange coxae and tarsi, while the remaining segments are brown. All legs, particularly the first pair, are covered with numerous white-grey and brown long hairs.
