= Evarcha amanzi =

Amanzi Evarcha jumping spider

Scientific classification
- Kingdom: Animalia
- Phylum: Arthropoda
- Subphylum: Chelicerata
- Class: Arachnida
- Order: Araneae
- Infraorder: Araneomorphae
- Family: Salticidae
- Genus: Evarcha
- Species: E. amanzi

Binomial name
- Evarcha amanzi Wesołowska & Haddad, 2018

Species of spider

Evarcha amanzi is a species of spider in the family Salticidae. It is endemic to South Africa and is commonly known as the Amanzi Evarcha jumping spider.

== Distribution ==
Evarcha amanzi is endemic to South Africa, where it is known only from Free State, specifically from Amanzi Private Game Reserve.

== Habitat and ecology ==
Evarcha amanzi is a ground-dwelling species sampled on the plateau of a hill in the Grassland Biome using pitfall traps at 414 m altitude.

== Conservation ==
The species is protected in the Amanzi Private Game Reserve.

== Taxonomy ==
Evarcha amanzi was described in 2018 from Amanzi Private Game Reserve in Free State. Only the male is known.
