= Evarcha armeniaca =

Scientific classification
- Kingdom: Animalia
- Phylum: Arthropoda
- Subphylum: Chelicerata
- Class: Arachnida
- Order: Araneae
- Infraorder: Araneomorphae
- Family: Salticidae
- Genus: Evarcha
- Species: E. armeniaca

Binomial name
- Evarcha armeniaca Logunov, 1999

Species of spider

Evarcha armeniaca is a jumping spider species in the genus Evarcha. It was first described by Dmitri Logunov in 1999 and is found in Armenia, Azerbaijan and Turkey.
