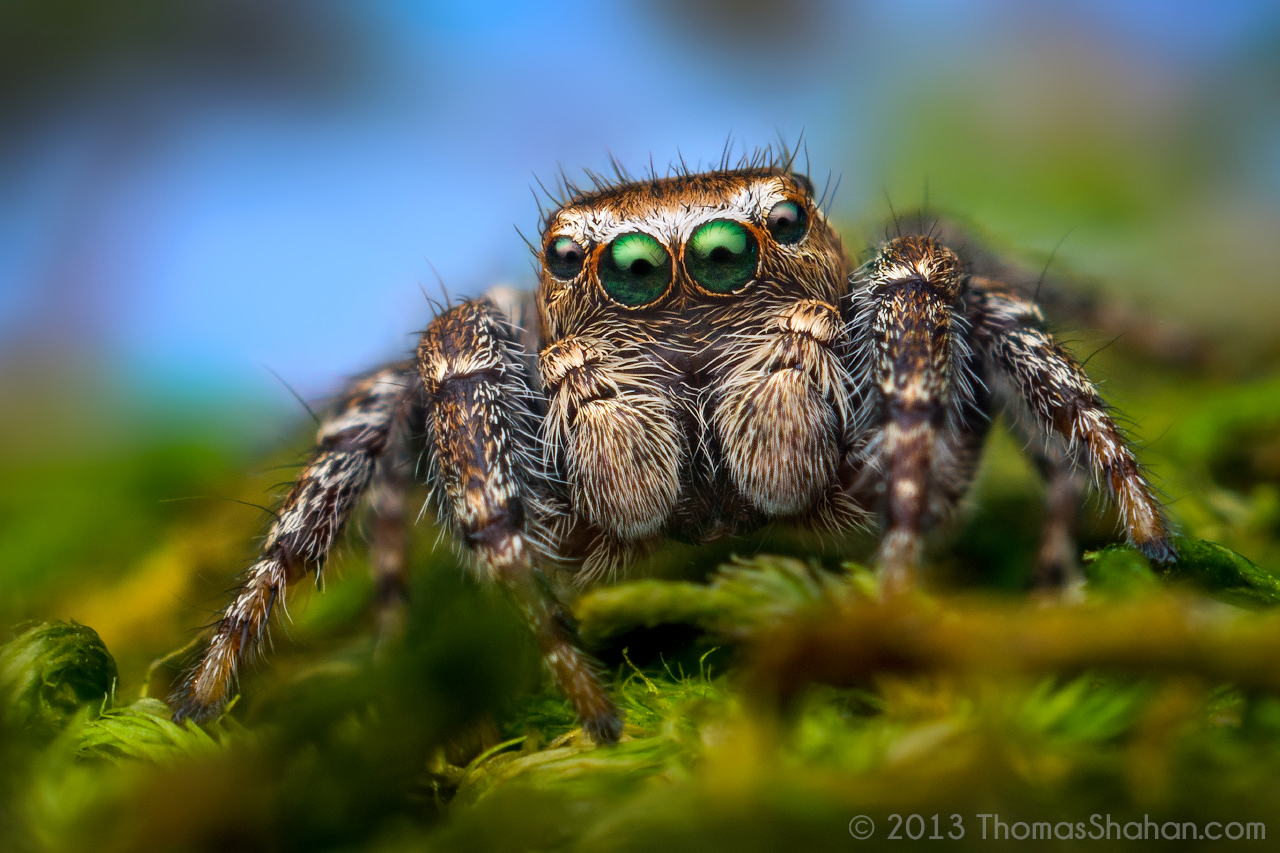

Scientific classification
- Kingdom: Animalia
- Phylum: Arthropoda
- Subphylum: Chelicerata
- Class: Arachnida
- Order: Araneae
- Infraorder: Araneomorphae
- Family: Salticidae
- Genus: Evarcha
- Species: E. proszynskii

Binomial name
- Evarcha proszynskii Marusik & Logunov, 1998

= Evarcha proszynskii =

Species of spider

Evarcha proszynskii is a species of jumping spider in the family Salticidae. It is found from Russia to Japan, and in the western United States and Canada.

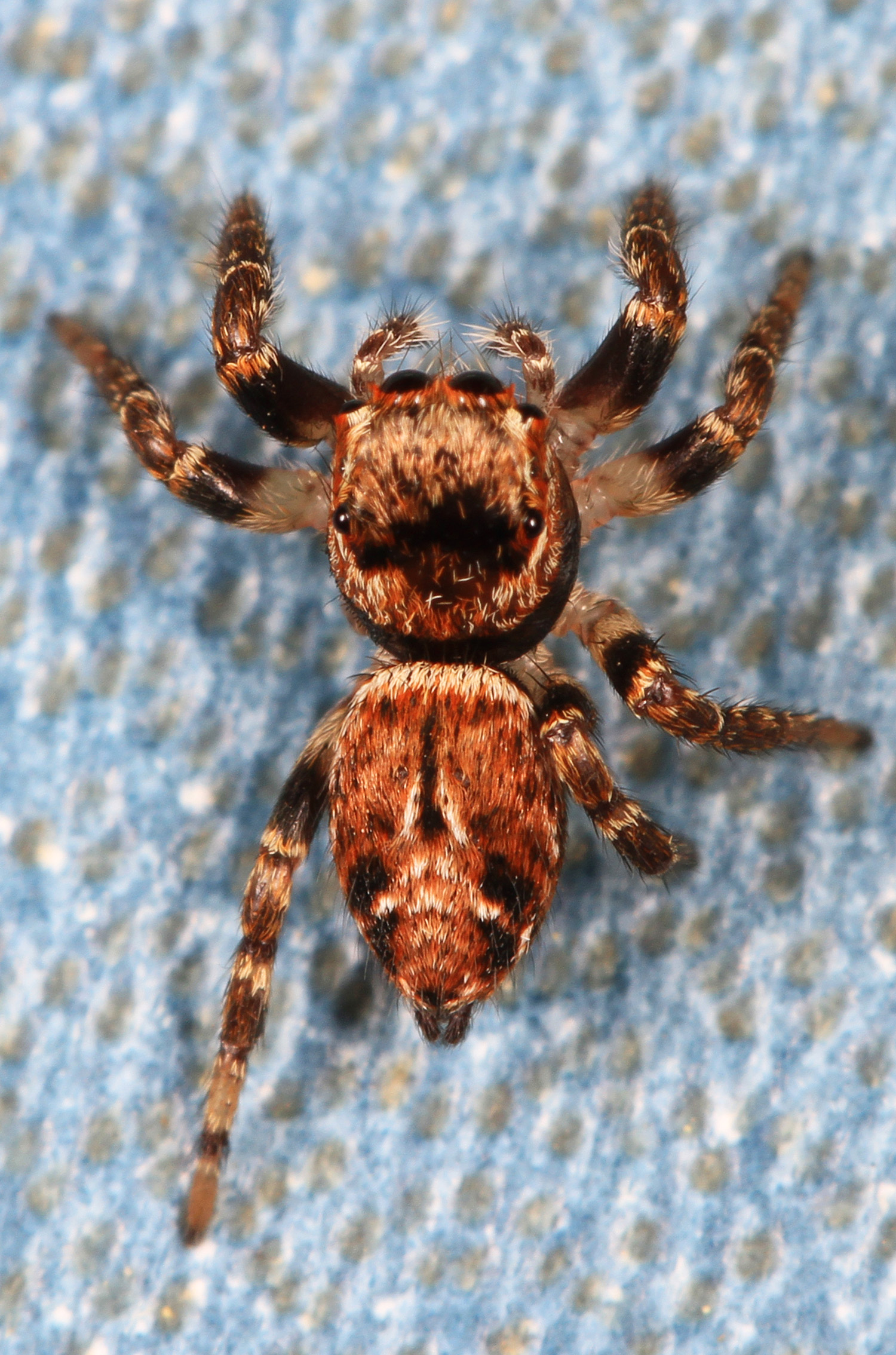
