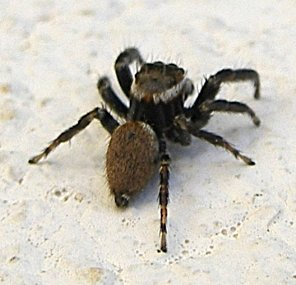
- Male

Scientific classification
- Kingdom: Animalia
- Phylum: Arthropoda
- Subphylum: Chelicerata
- Class: Arachnida
- Order: Araneae
- Infraorder: Araneomorphae
- Family: Salticidae
- Genus: Evarcha
- Species: E. jucunda

Binomial name
- Evarcha jucunda (Lucas, 1846)
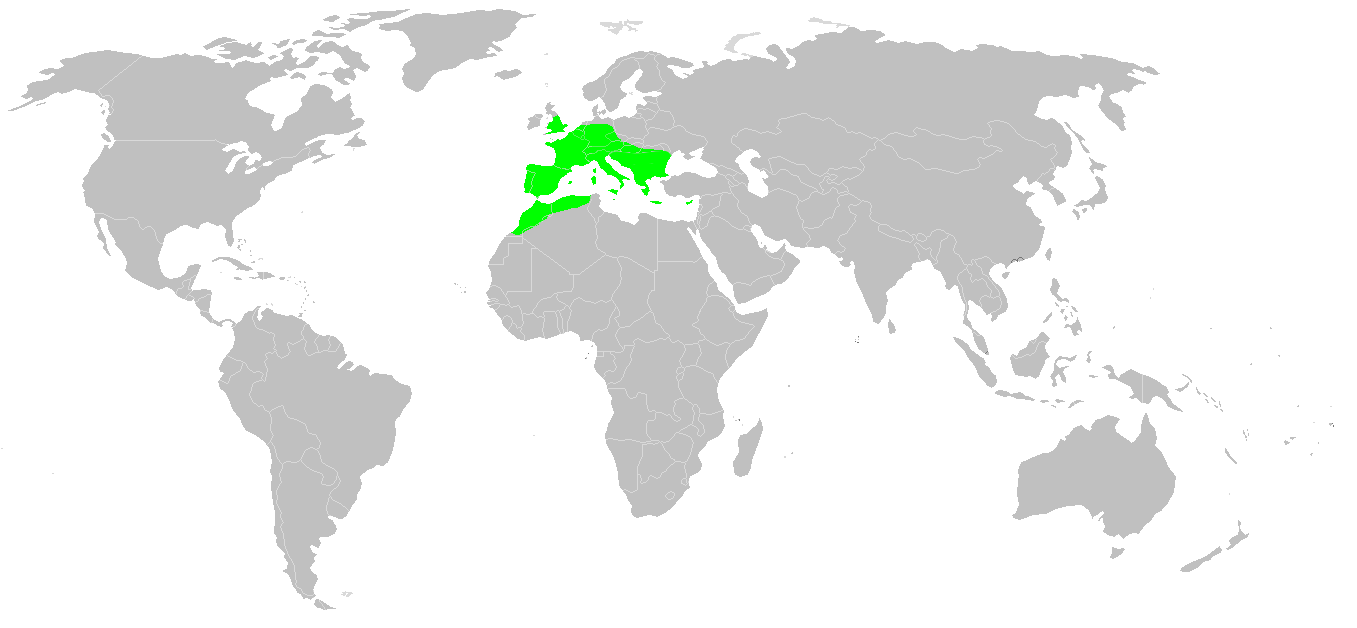

Synonyms
- Salticus jucundus Attus mitratus Phoebe jucunda Salticus obnixus Attus jucundus Hasarius jucundus Ergane jucunda Euarcha jucunda

= Evarcha jucunda =

Species of spider

Evarcha jucunda, known as the mediterranean white-banded spider, is a species of jumping spider.

It occurs naturally in the Mediterranean region, but was introduced to Belgium. It is also sometimes found in German greenhouses. Typically, it shows a large white or yellowish band surrounding the head region and a smaller one at the anterior end of abdomen. Males are black with a white line around their head and the top of their abdomen, which is brown.

== Name ==
The species name is derived from Latin jucundus "pleasant".
