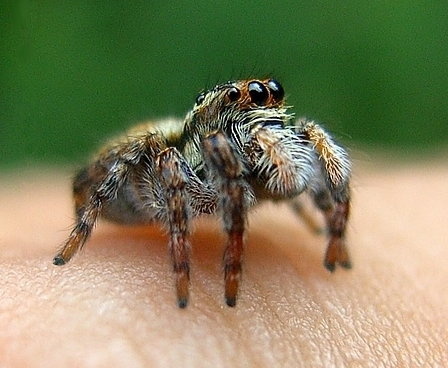
- Female Evarcha albaria
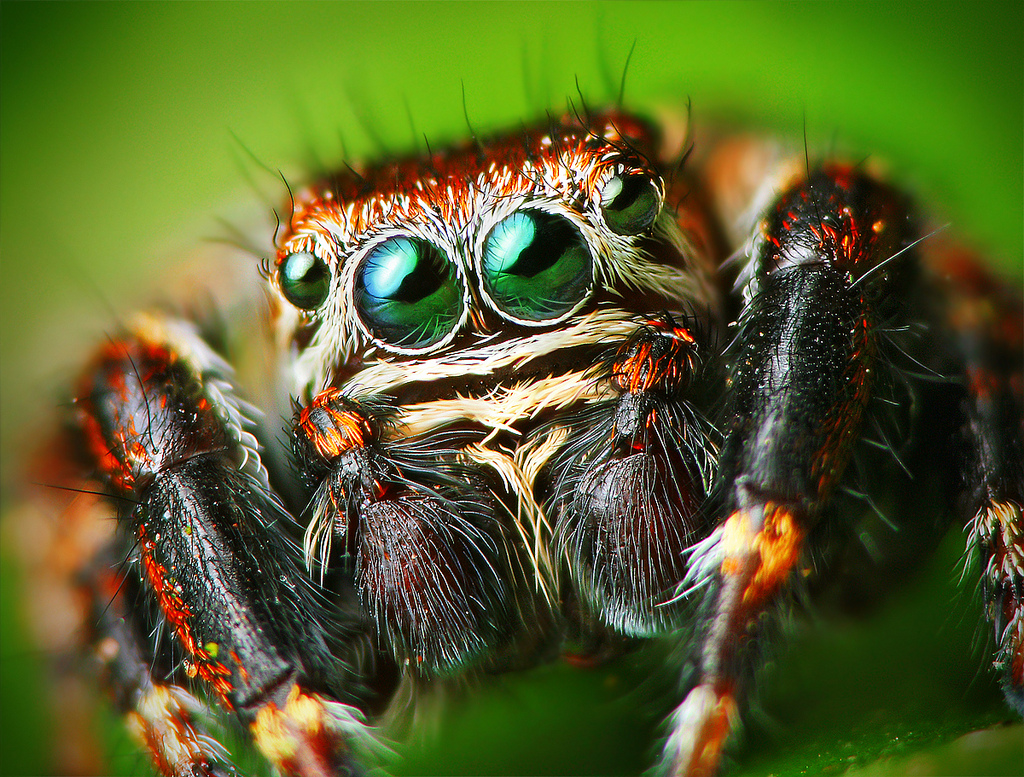
- Evarcha arcuata

Scientific classification
- Kingdom: Animalia
- Phylum: Arthropoda
- Subphylum: Chelicerata
- Class: Arachnida
- Order: Araneae
- Infraorder: Araneomorphae
- Family: Salticidae
- Subfamily: Salticinae
- Genus: Evarcha; Simon, 1902

Type species
- Araneus falcatus Clerck, 1757

Diversity
- 98 species

= Evarcha =

Genus of spiders

Evarcha is a genus of spiders in the family Salticidae (jumping spiders) with 85 species (and one recognized subspecies) distributed across the world.

== Habitat ==
These spiders are often found on shrubs and short plants in damp areas, resting in silken cells.

== Description ==
Spiders in this genus generally look rather sturdy and are not very colorful, often brownish.

Evarcha culicivora can be an uncommon predator due to the fact it feeds on vertebrate blood by choosing blood-carrying mosquitoes as well-liked prey.

== Distribution ==
Most species occur in Asia, Africa and parts of Europe, with E. amabilis and E. hoyi found only in the United States. E. proszynskii is found from Russia to Japan and Canada to United States.

== Species ==
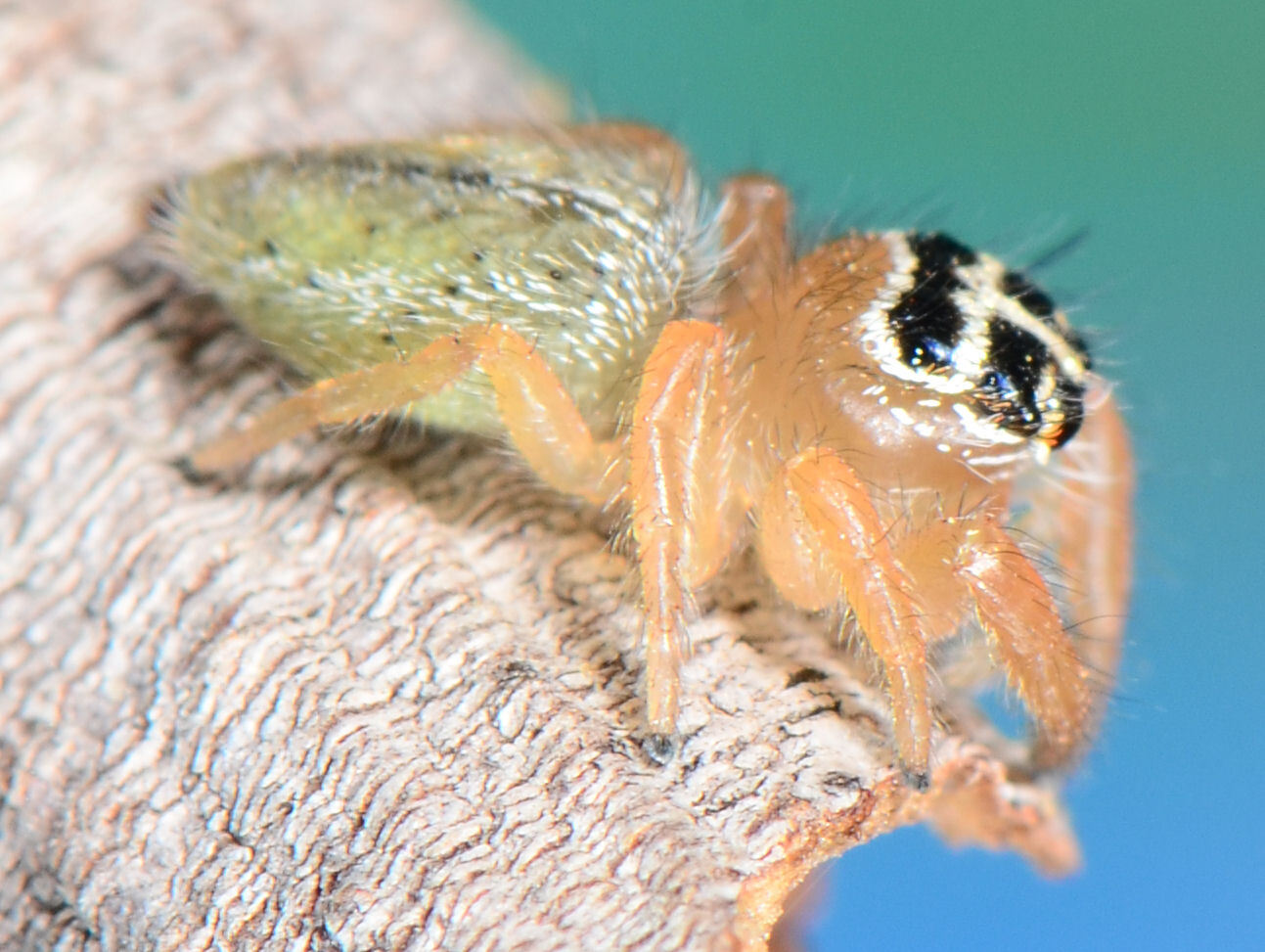
female E. alba

E. amabilis

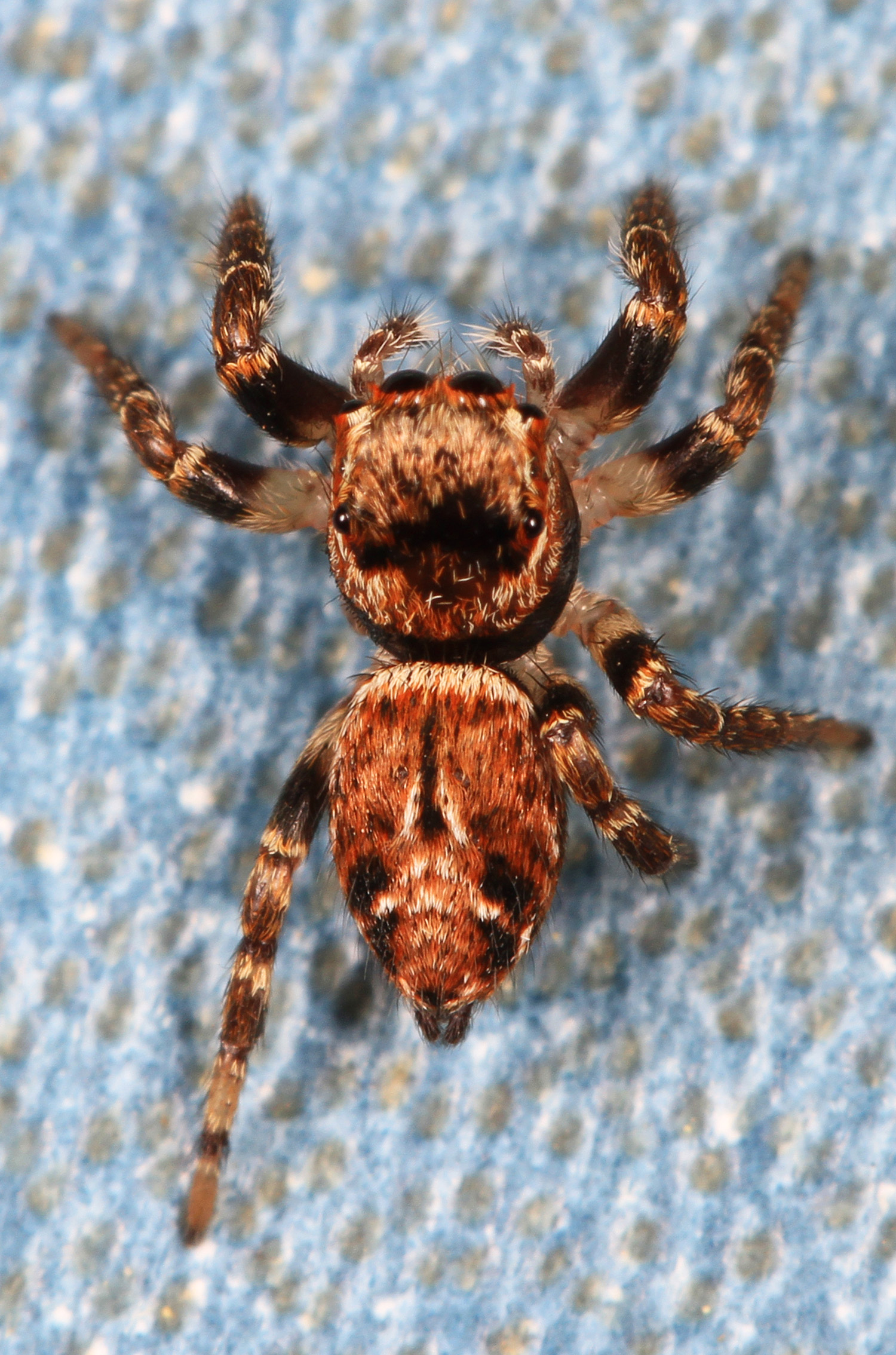
E. proszynskii

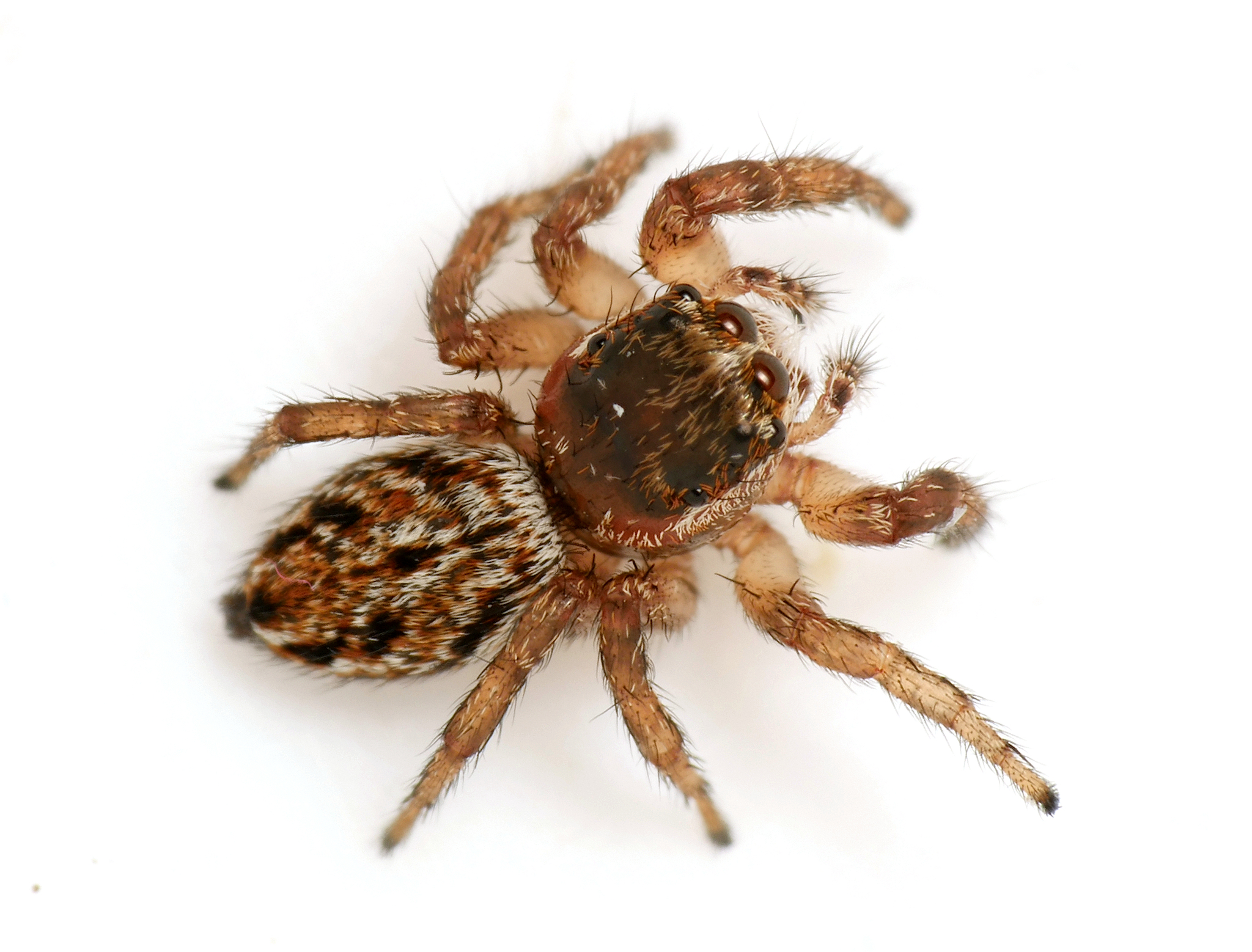
E. laetibunda

As of October 2025, this genus includes 98 species and one subspecies:

- Evarcha acuta Wesołowska, 2006 – Namibia, South Africa, Seychelles
- Evarcha aegyptiaca (Prószyński, 2018) – Egypt
- Evarcha alba (G. W. Peckham & E. G. Peckham, 1903) – Zimbabwe, South Africa
- Evarcha albaria (L. Koch, 1878) – Russia (Far East), China, Korea, Japan
- Evarcha albofacialis Wesołowska & Henrard, 2025 – Guinea
- Evarcha amabilis (C. L. Koch, 1846) – United States
- Evarcha amanzi Wesołowska & Haddad, 2018 – South Africa
- Evarcha ampulla Wesołowska & Henrard, 2025 – Guinea
- Evarcha annae (G. W. Peckham & E. G. Peckham, 1903) – South Africa
- Evarcha aposto Wesołowska & Tomasiewicz, 2008 – Nigeria, Ethiopia
- Evarcha arabica Wesołowska & van Harten, 2007 – Yemen
- Evarcha arcuata (Clerck, 1757) – Europe, Turkey, Caucasus, Russia (Europe to Far East), Kazakhstan, Iran, Central Asia, China, Japan
- Evarcha armeniaca Logunov, 1999 – Turkey, Georgia, Armenia, Azerbaijan
- Evarcha awashi Wesołowska & Tomasiewicz, 2008 – Ethiopia
- Evarcha bakorensis Rollard & Wesołowska, 2002 – Guinea, Ivory Coast, Ghana, Nigeria
- Evarcha besar (Prószyński, 2018) – Malaysia (Borneo)
- Evarcha bicoronata (Simon, 1901) – China (Hong Kong)
- Evarcha bihastata Wesołowska & Russell-Smith, 2000 – Tanzania
- Evarcha brinki Haddad & Wesołowska, 2011 – South Africa
- Evarcha bulbosa Żabka, 1985 – China, Taiwan, Thailand, Vietnam
- Evarcha carbonaria (Lessert, 1927) – DR Congo
- Evarcha certa Rollard & Wesołowska, 2002 – Guinea, Ethiopia
- Evarcha chappuisi Lessert, 1925 – Kenya, Tanzania
- Evarcha chiayiensis Chen, Lin & Ueng, 2021 – Taiwan
- Evarcha chubbi Lessert, 1925 – Tanzania
- Evarcha coreana Seo, 1988 – China, Korea
- Evarcha crinita Logunov & Zamanpoore, 2005 – Afghanistan
- Evarcha culicivora Wesołowska & Jackson, 2003 – Uganda, Kenya
- Evarcha damongo Wawer & Wesołowska, 2025 – Ghana
- Evarcha darinurica Logunov, 2001 – Afghanistan
- Evarcha darthvaderi Yu & Zhang, 2024 – China
- Evarcha degeni Wiśniewski & Wesołowska, 2024 – Uganda
- Evarcha dena Zamani, 2017 – Iran
- Evarcha denticulata Wesołowska & Haddad, 2013 – South Africa
- Evarcha difficilis Wesołowska & Henrard, 2025 – Guinea
- Evarcha dubia (Kulczyński, 1901) – Ethiopia
- Evarcha eriki Wunderlich, 1987 – Canary Islands
- Evarcha falcata (Clerck, 1757) – Europe, Turkey, Caucasus, Russia (Europe to South Siberia), Kazakhstan, Afghanistan, China (type species)
  - E. f. xinglongensis Yang & Tang, 1996 – China
- Evarcha fasciata Seo, 1992 – China, Korea, Japan
- Evarcha flagellaris Haddad & Wesołowska, 2011 – Ghana, Kenya, Zimbabwe, South Africa
- Evarcha flavocincta (C. L. Koch, 1846) – India, Bhutan, Myanmar, China, Taiwan, Japan, Vietnam, Singapore, Indonesia (Bintang Is.)
- Evarcha gausapata (Thorell, 1890) – Indonesia (Sumatra, Java)
- Evarcha hoyi (G. W. Peckham & E. G. Peckham, 1883) – Canada, United States
- Evarcha hyllinella Strand, 1913 – Indonesia (Lombok)
- Evarcha idanrensis Wesołowska & Russell-Smith, 2011 – Nigeria
- Evarcha ignea Wesołowska & Cumming, 2008 – Nigeria, Botswana, Zimbabwe, Mozambique, South Africa
- Evarcha improcera Wesołowska & van Harten, 2007 – Yemen
- Evarcha infrastriata (Keyserling, 1881) – Australia (Queensland)
- Evarcha insularis (Metzner, 1999) – Greece, Turkey, Cyprus, Iraq, Iran
- Evarcha jucunda (Lucas, 1846) – Canary Islands, Mediterranean. Introduced to Belgium, Germany
- Evarcha karas Wesołowska, 2011 – Namibia, South Africa
- Evarcha kirghisica Rakov, 1997 – Kyrgyzstan
- Evarcha kochi Simon, 1902 – Indonesia (Java, Lombok)
- Evarcha kpongensis Wawer & Wesołowska, 2025 – Ghana
- Evarcha laetabunda (C. L. Koch, 1846) – Europe, North Africa, Turkey, Caucasus, Russia (Europe to Far East), Kazakhstan, China
- Evarcha lata Kanesharatnam & Benjamin, 2021 – Sri Lanka
- Evarcha longula (Thorell, 1881) – New Guinea, Australia
- Evarcha maculata Rollard & Wesołowska, 2002 – Guinea, Ivory Coast, Ethiopia
- Evarcha madagascariensis Prószyński, 1992 – Madagascar
- Evarcha magna Wesołowska & Henrard, 2025 – Guinea
- Evarcha michailovi Logunov, 1992 – Europe, Turkey, Russia (Europe to South Siberia), Caucasus, Kazakhstan, Central Asia, China
- Evarcha mirabilis Wesołowska & Haddad, 2009 – South Africa
- Evarcha mongolica Danilov & Logunov, 1994 – Russia (South Siberia), China
- Evarcha negevensis Prószyński, 2000 – Israel, Iran
- Evarcha nenilini Rakov, 1997 – Kazakhstan, Turkmenistan, Kyrgyzstan, Tajikistan
- Evarcha nepos (O. Pickard-Cambridge, 1872) – Algeria, Greece, Turkey, Cyprus, Israel
- Evarcha nigricans (Dalmas, 1920) – Tunisia
- Evarcha nigrifrons (C. L. Koch, 1846) – Indonesia (Sumatra)
- Evarcha obscura Caporiacco, 1947 – East Africa
- Evarcha patagiata (O. Pickard-Cambridge, 1872) – Greece, Turkey, Cyprus, Israel, Syria
- Evarcha picta Wesołowska & van Harten, 2007 – Yemen
- Evarcha pileckii Prószyński, 2000 – Syria, Israel
- Evarcha pinguis Wesołowska & Tomasiewicz, 2008 – Ethiopia
- Evarcha praeclara Prószyński & Wesołowska, 2003 – Sudan, Israel, Yemen, United Arab Emirates, Iran
- Evarcha prosimilis Wesołowska & Cumming, 2008 – Uganda, Kenya, Tanzania, Zimbabwe, Mozambique, South Africa
- Evarcha proszynskii Marusik & Logunov, 1998 – Kazakhstan, Russia (Middle Siberia to Far East), China, Korea, Japan, Alaska, Canada, United States
- Evarcha pseudopococki Peng, Xie & Kim, 1993 – China
- Evarcha pulchella (Thorell, 1895) – Pakistan, India, Myanmar
- Evarcha reiskindi Berry, Beatty & Prószyński, 1996 – Caroline Is.
- Evarcha rotundibulbis Wesołowska & Tomasiewicz, 2008 – Ethiopia, Mozambique
- Evarcha russellsmithi Wesołowska & Tomasiewicz, 2008 – Ethiopia
- Evarcha selenaria Suguro & Yahata, 2012 – Japan
- Evarcha seyun Wesołowska & van Harten, 2007 – Yemen, United Arab Emirates
- Evarcha similis Caporiacco, 1941 – Ethiopia
- Evarcha soricina (Thorell, 1899) – Cameroon, Mozambique
- Evarcha squamulata (Simon, 1902) – Sierra Leone
- Evarcha striolata Wesołowska & Haddad, 2009 – South Africa
- Evarcha syriaca Kulczyński, 1911 – Syria, Israel
- Evarcha tsipikafotsy Murray, Escobar-Toledo & Pett, 2024 – Madagascar
- Evarcha vavannyangisy Murray, Escobar-Toledo & Pett, 2024 – Madagascar
- Evarcha villosa Wesołowska & Haddad, 2018 – South Africa
- Evarcha vitosa Próchniewicz, 1989 – Central, East Africa
- Evarcha vittula Haddad & Wesołowska, 2011 – South Africa
- Evarcha werneri (Simon, 1906) – Guinea, South Sudan, Ethiopia, Uganda, Tanzania, Namibia, South Africa
- Evarcha wulingensis Peng, Xie & Kim, 1993 – China
- Evarcha zayu Wang, Mi & Li, 2024 – China
- Evarcha zimbabwensis Wesołowska & Cumming, 2008 – Zimbabwe, South Africa
- Evarcha zougoussi Wesołowska & Russell-Smith, 2022 – Ivory Coast
