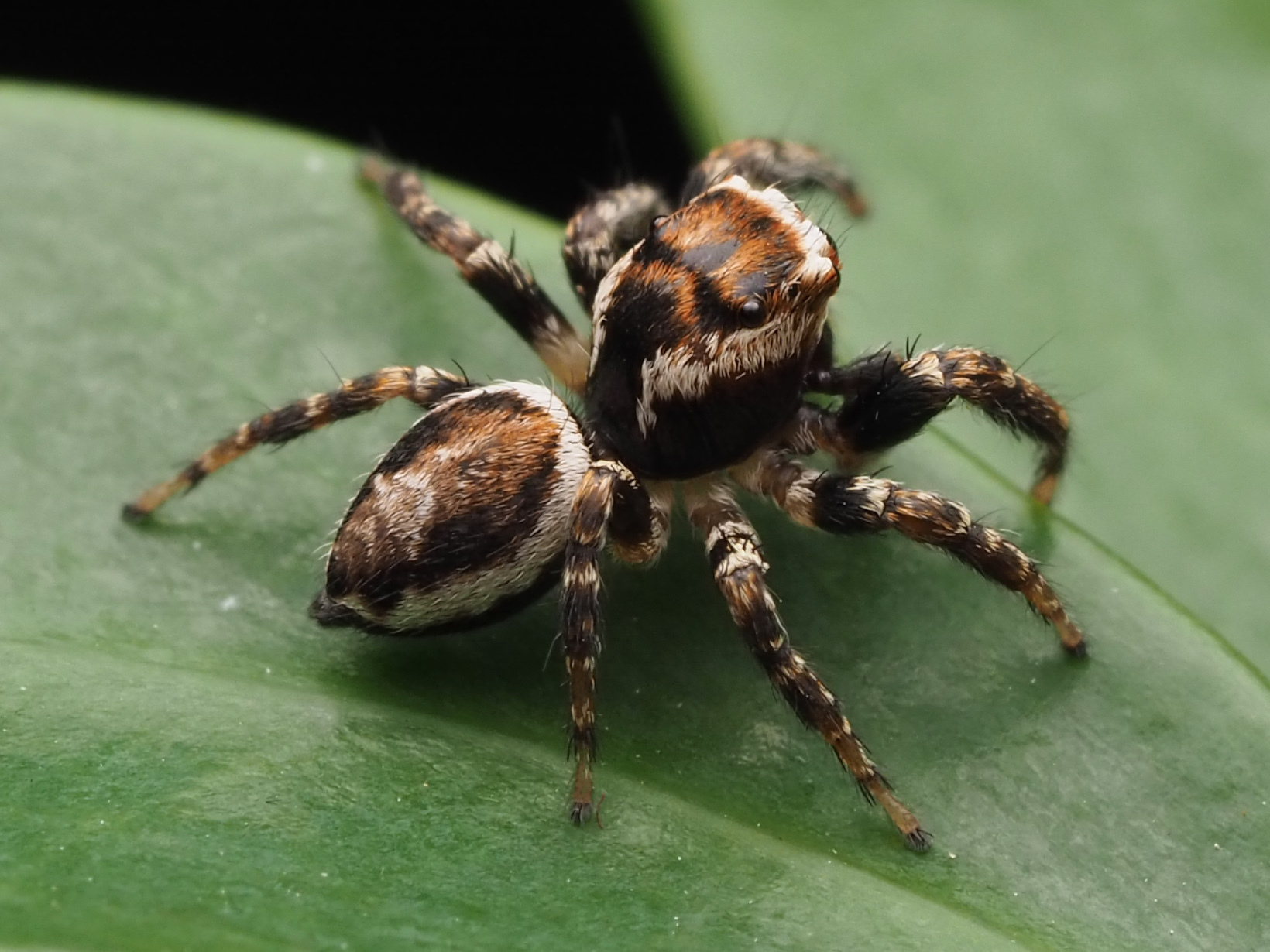
- Male in Pennsylvania
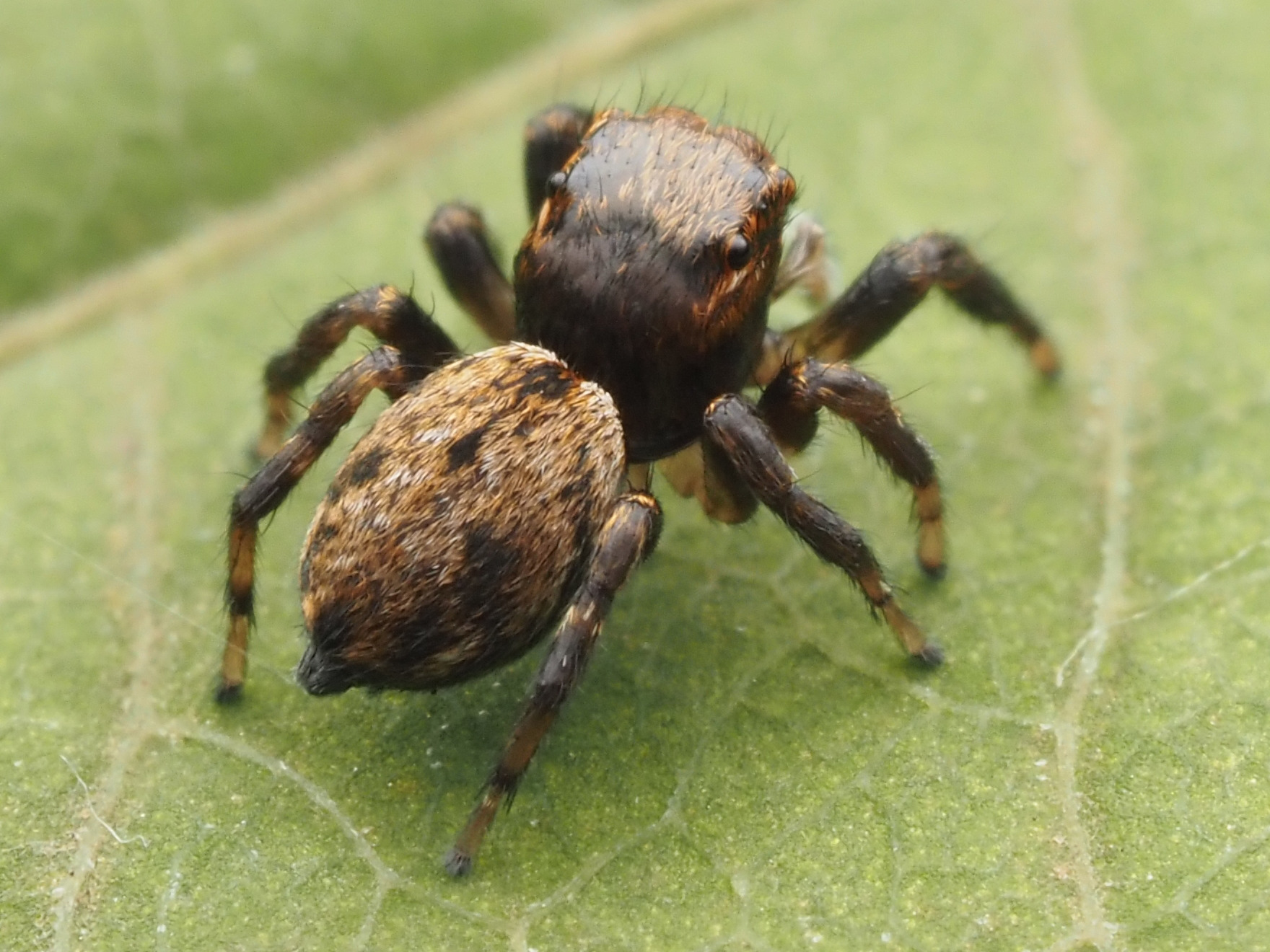
- Female in New Hampshire

Scientific classification
- Kingdom: Animalia
- Phylum: Arthropoda
- Subphylum: Chelicerata
- Class: Arachnida
- Order: Araneae
- Infraorder: Araneomorphae
- Family: Salticidae
- Genus: Evarcha
- Species: E. hoyi

Binomial name
- Evarcha hoyi (Peckham & Peckham, 1883)

= Evarcha hoyi =

Species of spider

Evarcha hoyi is a species of jumping spider. It is found in the United States and Canada.
