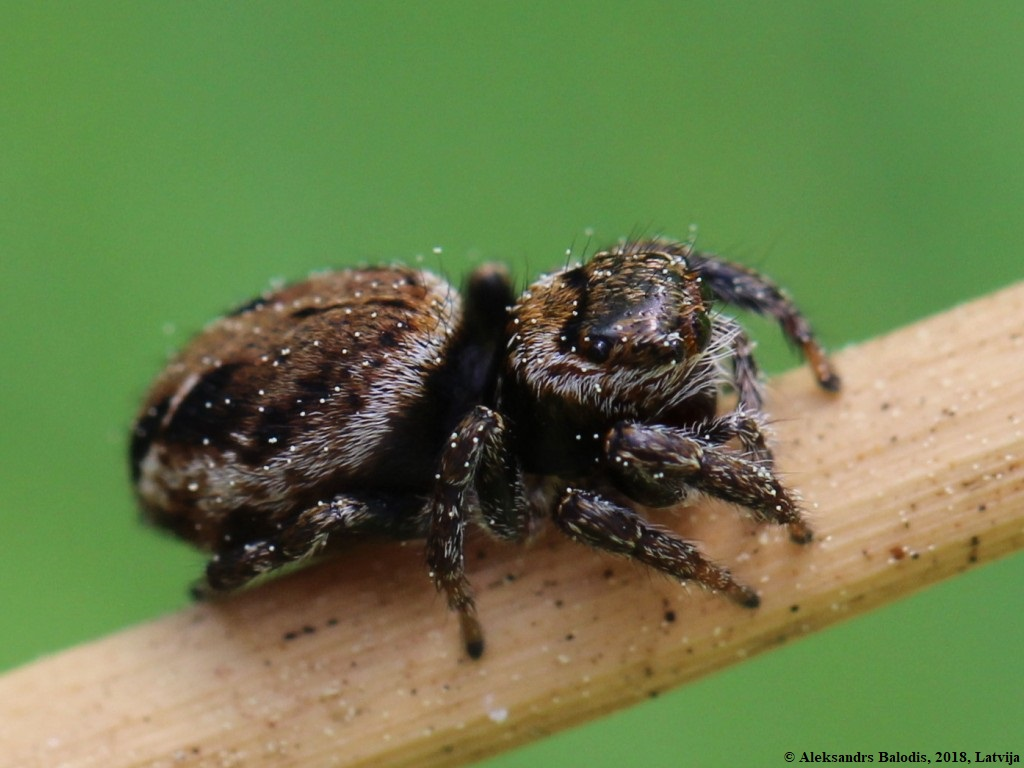
- female from Latvia
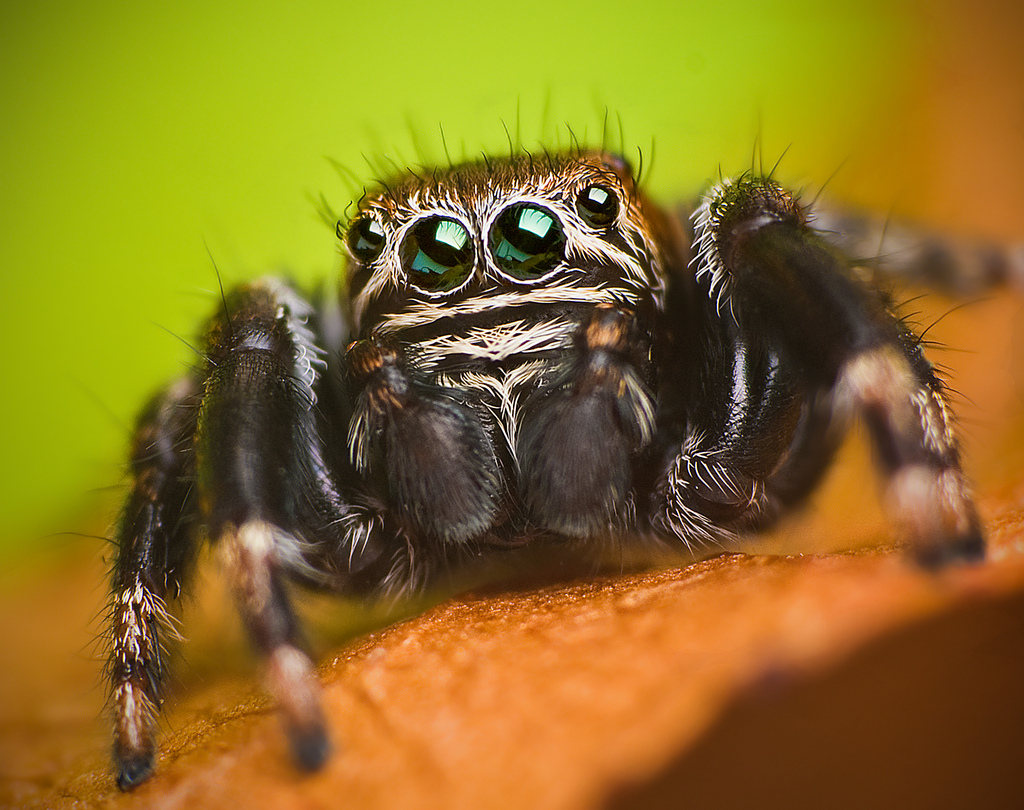
- Male Evarcha arcuata

Scientific classification
- Kingdom: Animalia
- Phylum: Arthropoda
- Subphylum: Chelicerata
- Class: Arachnida
- Order: Araneae
- Infraorder: Araneomorphae
- Family: Salticidae
- Genus: Evarcha
- Species: E. arcuata

Binomial name
- Evarcha arcuata (Clerck, 1757)
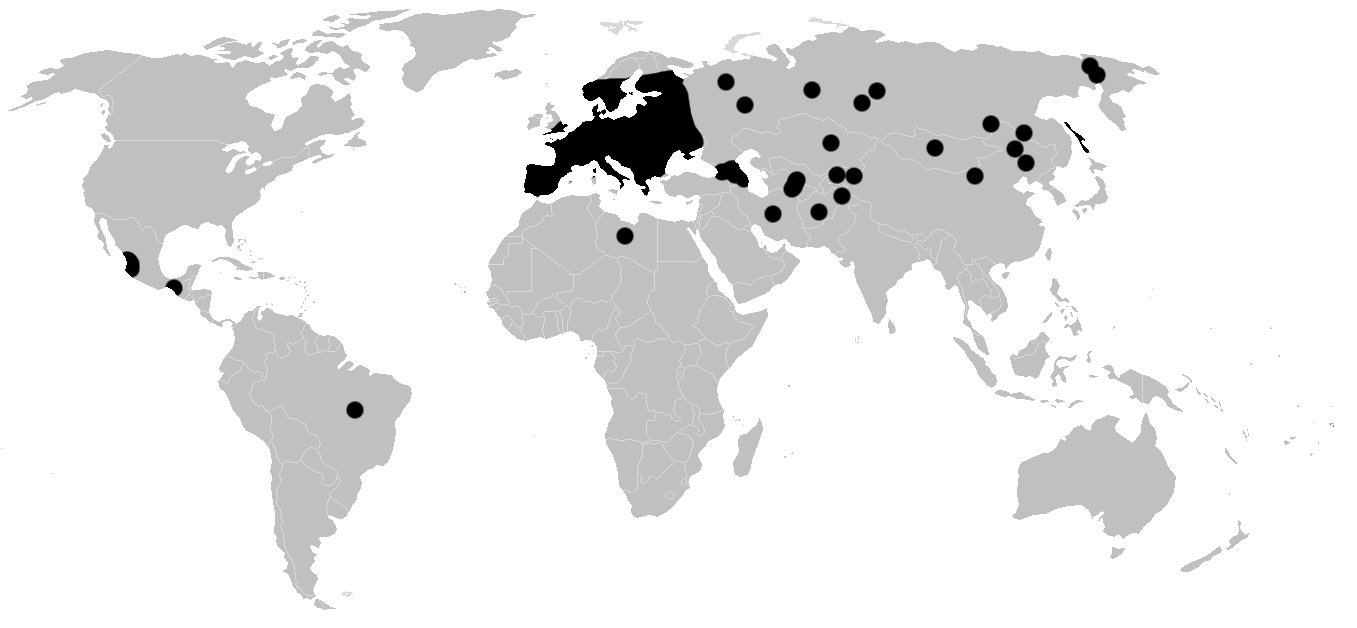

Synonyms
- Araneus arcuatus Clerck, 1757; Aranea marcgravii Scopoli, 1763; Aranea grossipes De Geer, 1778; Aranea truncorum Schrank, 1781; Aranea goezenii Schrank, 1781; Aranea frontalis Olivier, 1789; Salticus grossipes Latreille, 1819; Attus limbatus Hahn, 1826; Attus grossipes Walckenaer, 1837; Dendryphantes grossus C. L. Koch, 1837; Euophrys farinosa C. L. Koch, 1837; Euophrys arcuata C. L. Koch, 1846; Euophrys paludicola C. L. Koch, 1846; Maturna arcuata C. L. Koch, 1850; Attus arcuata Westring, 1861; Maturna grossipes Simon, 1864; Euophrys limbata Canestrini & Pavesi, 1868; Attus albociliatus Simon, 1868; Attus farinosus Simon, 1868; Hasarius arcuata Simon, 1876; Ergane arcuata Simon, 1876; Hasarius farinosus Sørensen, 1904; Evarcha marcgravii Dahl & Dahl, 1926

= Evarcha arcuata =

Species of spider

Evarcha arcuata is a species of jumping spider of the genus Evarcha. It has a wide Palearctic distribution, occurring across Europe, Turkey, the Caucasus, Russia (from Europe to the Far East), Kazakhstan, Iran, Central Asia, China, and Japan.

== Etymology ==
The species name arcuata is derived from Latin arcus meaning "bow", with the meaning "arched" or "curved", referring to the distinctive arched pattern on the opisthosoma.

== Distribution ==
E. arcuata has an extensive Palearctic range, spanning from Europe across Asia to the Far East. It occurs throughout Europe, extending into Turkey, the Caucasus region, across Russia from European parts to the Far East including Siberia, Kazakhstan, Iran, Central Asia, China, and Japan. This wide distribution makes it one of the most widespread species in the genus Evarcha.

== Description ==
male

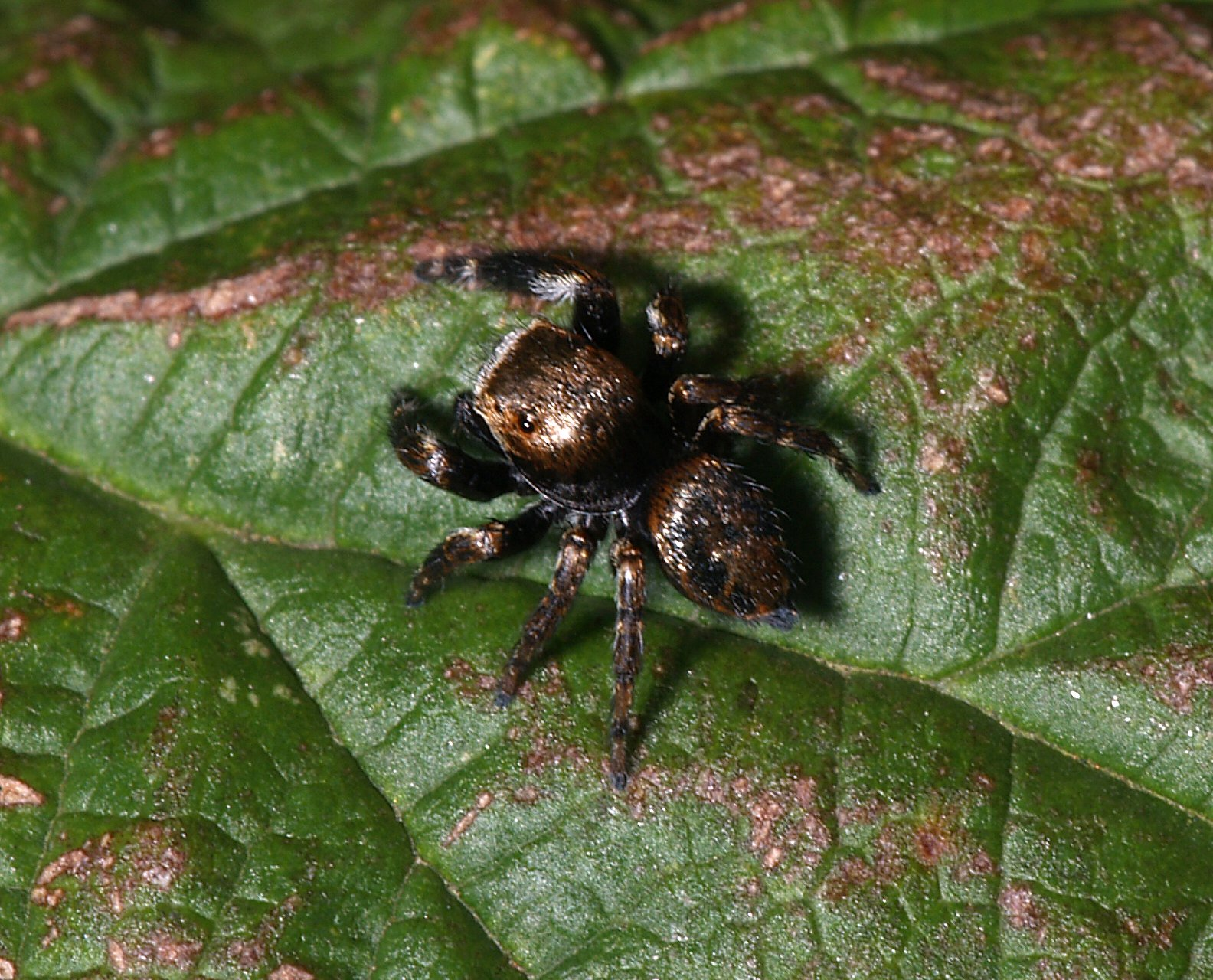
male

female

female

Like many jumping spiders, Evarcha arcuata exhibits pronounced sexual dimorphism in both size and coloration.

Males reach a body length of approximately 4.1-4.9 mm, while females are larger at 4.8-5.8 mm. The male cephalothorax is dark brown to black with white marginal stripes and a white median stripe. The clypeus is covered with white scales. The opisthosoma is dark brown to black dorsally with white lateral stripes that curve inward posteriorly, creating an arched pattern. The venter is dark gray to black.

The female cephalothorax is yellow-brown with white marginal stripes and a less distinct median stripe. The clypeus has sparse white scales. The opisthosoma is yellow-brown dorsally with a pattern of white and dark markings forming chevron-like designs, and the venter is yellow-brown to gray.

Both sexes have legs that are yellow-brown with darker annulations. The pedipalps in males are dark brown to black, while in females they are yellow-brown.

== Taxonomy ==
The species was originally described by Carl Alexander Clerck in 1757 as Araneus arcuatus in his work Svenska Spindlar. It has since been described under numerous synonyms, reflecting the complex taxonomic history of jumping spiders and the confusion that arose from early taxonomic work when spider classification was less well established.

The species is currently placed in the genus Evarcha, which was established by Eugène Simon in 1902. The extensive synonymy list demonstrates the wide distribution of this species and the independent descriptions by various authors across different regions.
