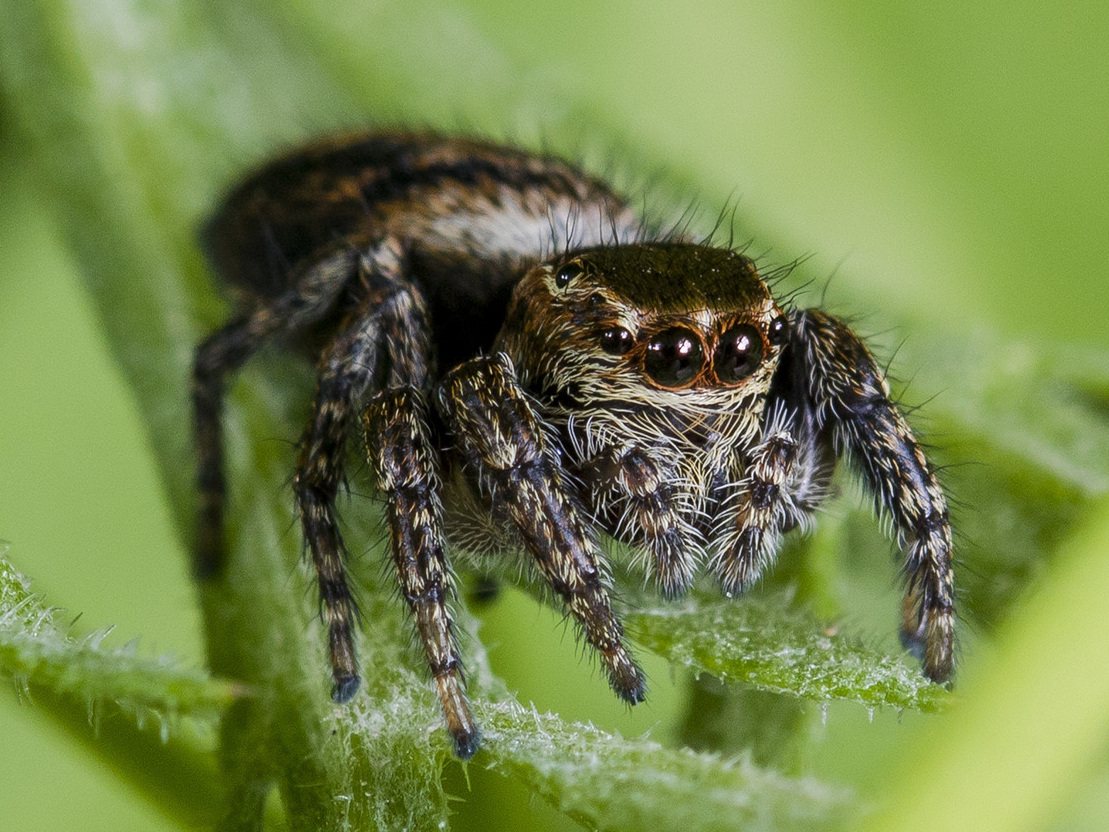
- A female Evarcha michailovi

Scientific classification
- Kingdom: Animalia
- Phylum: Arthropoda
- Subphylum: Chelicerata
- Class: Arachnida
- Order: Araneae
- Infraorder: Araneomorphae
- Family: Salticidae
- Genus: Evarcha
- Species: E. michailovi

Binomial name
- Evarcha michailovi Logunov, 1992

= Evarcha michailovi =

Species of jumping spider

Evarcha michailovi is a species of jumping spider in the genus Evarcha that is endemic to Europe and Asia. It thrives in dry grassland and heath, but it has also been found in areas of human habitation. The species was first described in 1992 by Dmitri Logunov based on a specimen found in Russia. Examples of the species had been previously discovered in Mongolia ten years earlier, but these had been misidentified. The spider has a brown to dark brown carapace that measures between 2.08 and 2.75 mm (0.08 and 0.11 in) in length that, in some examples, has light stripes running down its sides. Its black eye field is marked by a white stripe while its clypeus is orange and hairy. It has an abdomen that is between 1.88 and 3.13 mm (0.07 and 0.12 in) long, the females are generally larger than males. It is often dark grey on top but there is a wide variation in the pattern across different specimens. The underside of the abdomen is a uniform brown-grey, The markings on the carapace help distinguish the species from others in the genus, as does the species distribution. It can also be identified by its copulatory organs, particularly the shape of the male embolus and the presence of a plate on the female epigyne.

== Taxonomy and etymology ==
Evarcha michailovi is a species of jumping spider, a member of the family Salticidae, that was first described by the arachnologist Dmitri Logunov in 1992. He allocated it to the genus Evarcha, first circumscribed by Eugène Simon in 1902. The genus has members on four continents. The species is named after the arachnologist Kirill G. Mikhailov.

In 1976, Jerzy Prószyński placed the genus in the subfamily Pelleninae, along with the genera Bianor and Pellenes. In Wayne Maddison's 2015 study of spider phylogenetic classification, the genus Evarcha was moved to the subtribe Plexippina. Plexippinae and Pelleninae together make up the group Plexippoida. Plexippina is a member of the tribe Plexippini, in the subclade Simonida in the clade Saltafresia. In the following year, Prószyński added the genus to a group of genera named Evarchines, named after the genus, along with Hasarinella and Nigorella, based on similarities in the spiders' copulatory organs. When he revisited the taxonomy of the species in 2018, Prószyński retained the spider in a truncated Evarcha genus. His decision to create new genera out of the members of Evarcha has been controversial, and the exact relationship between Evarcha michailovi and other members of the tribe is uncertain.

== Description ==
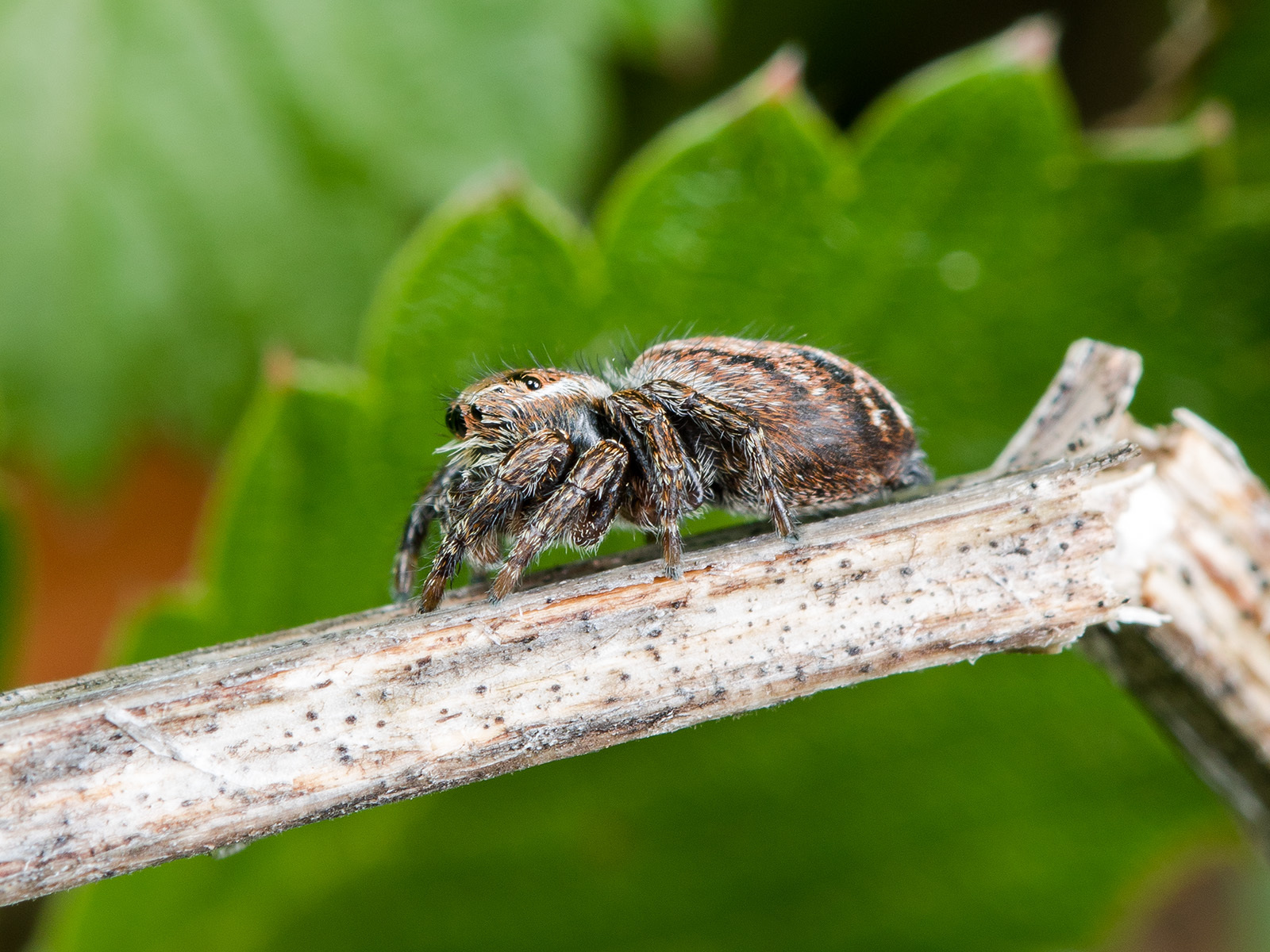
A male Evarcha michailovi

Evarcha michailovi is a small spider. The spider's body is divided into two main parts, both egg-shaped or ovoid: a more rounded cephalothorax and a more oval abdomen. The male carapace, the hard upper part of the cephalothorax, is between 2.08 and 2.85 mm (0.08 and 0.11 in) long and 1.53 and 2.13 mm (0.06 and 0.08 in) wide. It is generally dark brown to brown and, in some examples, has two white stripes running down the sides. The eye field is black with a white stripe across its eyes. The underside of the cephalothorax, or sternum, is orange-brown. The spider's clypeus is orange and covered in thin white and orange hairs. The spider's mouthparts, including its chelicerae, labium and maxillae are generally orange-brown.

The male spider's abdomen is between 1.88 and 2.75 mm (0.07 and 0.11 in) long and 1.24 and 2 mm (0.05 and 0.08 in) wide. It is generally dark grey on top but its pattern varies between individual spiders. Some have an abdomen marked with a pattern of dark line from front to back that has two white oval spots towards the front and black lines across the sides. Many spiders have a pattern of whitish-grey and blackish-brown spots on a greyish-brown surface or of dark and light patches, which seem to be randomly arranged. The underside is lighter and uniform brown-grey. The spider has brownish-grey covers to its book lungs and spinnerets. Males have brown legs with yellowish tarsi and the front legs are longer and wider than the posterior legs.

Female spiders are slightly larger in size than males, with a carapace that is between 2.38 and 2.75 mm (0.09 and 0.11 in) long, and 1.8 and 2 mm (0.07 and 0.08 in) wide, and have a substantially larger abdomen between 3 and 3.13 mm (0.12 and 0.12 in) long and 1.5 and 1.65 mm (0.06 and 0.06 in) wide. They are generally lighter than the males and a larger of proportion of their legs are yellow. In some examples, the upper surface of the abdomen have a pattern of light and dark patches on a brown background.

The spider's copulatory organs are distinctive. The male has a wide palpal tibia that has a large and blunt protrusion, or tibial apophysis. The palpal bulb is round with a flattened end at the bottom and a fat embolus emanating from at its top. The cymbium is rather large and encloses much of the bulb. There are small hairs on the cymbium and tibia. The female has a pronounced plate at the front of its epigyne that bounds the two copulatory openings. These lead, via short and wide insemination ducts, to irregularly-shaped spermathecae, or receptacles, with small accessory glands.

=== Similar spiders ===
Like most Evarcha spiders, Evarcha michailovi is hard to distinguish from others in the genus. It has also been misidentified as examples of the species Heliophanus simplex, Phlegra fuscipes and Sitticus pubescens. Previously, specimen have been misidentified as the related Evarcha laetabunda, particularly the males. It can be distinguished from this species by its larger size and the presence of a thicker embolus. The female spider can also be distinguished from related species by the design of its copulatory organs. Evarcha michailovi has greater sclerotization on its epigyne and a different spermathecae structure than other Evarcha spiders. It can also be identified by the thick walled rim at the back of its epigyne. Arachnologists Jean-Claude Ledoux and Michel Emerit also noticed that the spider has a different species distribution. Evarcha michailovi generally prefers drier habitats to other Evarcha species. It also has differences in the markings on its carapace.

== Discovery and distribution ==
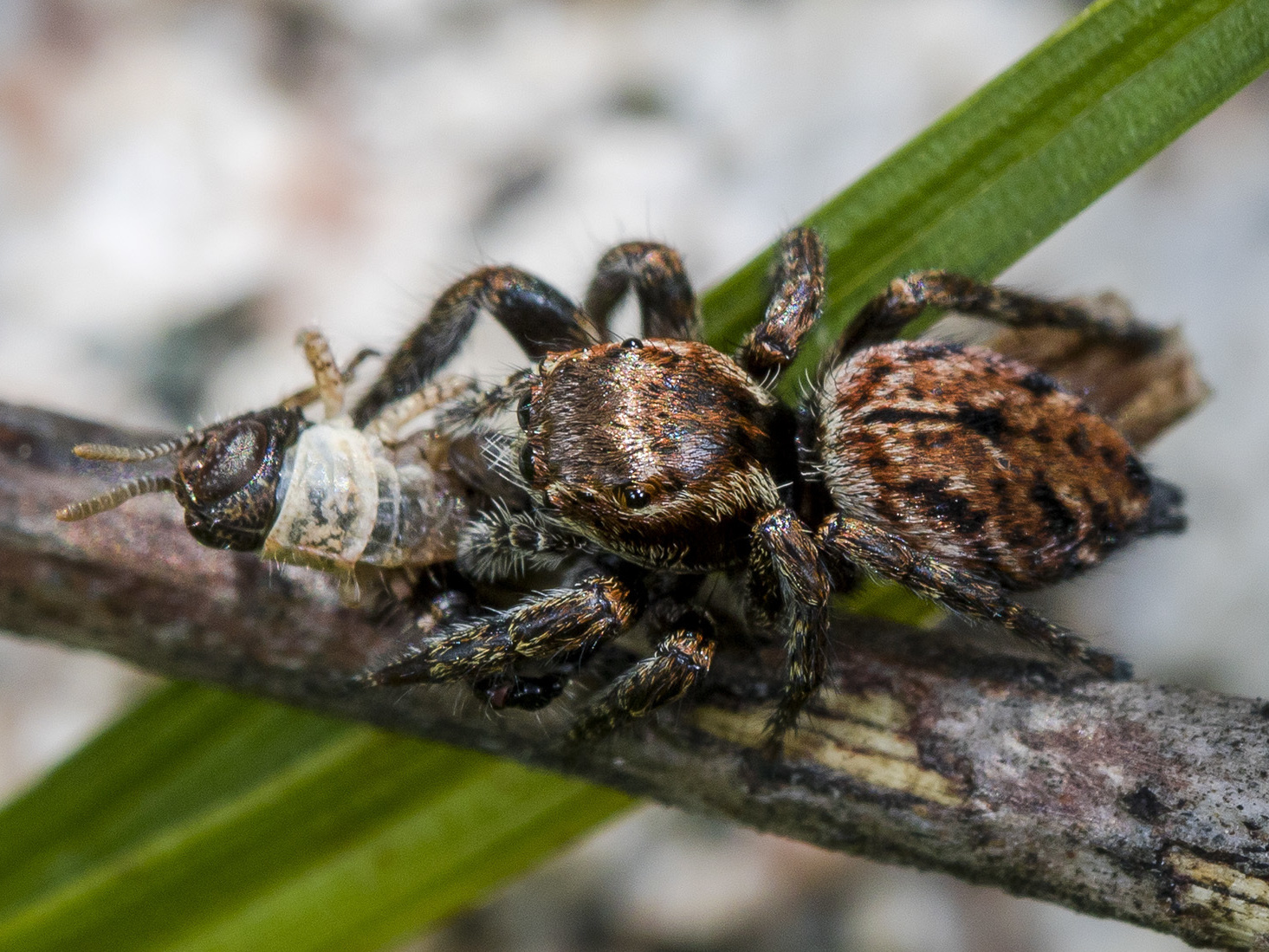
Female Evarcha michailovi with prey

Evarcha spiders live across the world. Evarcha michailovi was originally viewed as a Siberian species, but has been found living across wide areas of Russia, China, Central Asia and Kazakhstan, into Europe and Turkey. The male holotype was found in 1988 in the Sayano-Shushenski Nature Reserve in Russia amongst the Sayan Mountains. Other examples of the spider were in other areas of the Altai-Sayan region, often at high altitudes. For example, a female was discovered near Todzha Lake in the Azas Nature Reserve at an altitude of 900 m (3,000 ft) above sea level in 1989. The first example to be found in Kazakhstan the following year amongst the Saur Mountains at an altitude of 1,800 m (5,900 ft) above sea level. It has also been observed in Kyrgyzstan, the first instance being in 1991 alongside the river Arshan in the Terskey Ala-too mountains, and in Turkmenistan on the mountains of the Kopet Dag.

The first time the spider was identified living outside the Soviet Union was in 2001 based on specimens from Tacheng, Xinjiang, China, alongside others from Bayantsogt and Bayan-Uul in Mongolia. The Mongolian specimen were originally found in 1982 but misidentified. The species has since been discovered in Turkey, initially in the village of Kavalcık, Reyhanlı, then in Hatay Province in 2007.

During this time, the species distribution was extended into Europe in 2004 by Jean-Claude Ledoux and Michel Emerit. The first spiders to be identified as members of the species in France was a female, a male and four juveniles in Les Eyzies in Dordogne, which were collected in 1986. Others heave been identified in Gard, Hérault and Pyrénées-Orientales The distribution was further extended into the Balkans in 2010; 1.1 km (0.68 mi) north of Sokolarci in Češinovo-Obleševo, North Macedonia, at an altitude of 436 m (1,430 ft) above sea level. The spider has also been seen living in the Dinaric Alps, which extend into Slovenia at altitudes varying from 359 to 484 m (1,178 to 1,588 ft) above sea level. It has also been seen in Germany and the Netherlands. Subsequent discovery of the species in Spain has proved that its distribution covers the entire continent.

== Habitat ==
The first Evarcha michailovi spiders were found on steppe and along the sides of forests, living amongst Alder and shrubs of genera like Cotoneaster. It has subsequently been found in a wide range of environments., including Alpine climates, on steppes and in forests of larch and pine. French examples were seen in dry meadows, heath of Cistus laurifolius, and grassy dykes. The spider also thrives in dry heathland, even when this is undergrowth located within coniferous forests. The spider was seen in areas of human habitation, including urban areas. Some spiders were discovered living the railway station at Chulym in 1994.

The species lives alongside a number of other spiders, including Agelena labyrinthica, Agyneta affinis, Alopecosa barbipes, Alopecosa schmidti, Asagena phalerata, Drassodes pubescens, Haplodrassus dalmatensis, Micaria dives, Pardosa monticola, Philodromus collinus, Sitticus saltator, Theridion uhligi, Xerolycosa miniata, Xerolycosa nemoralis, Xysticus ninnii, Zelotes electus and Zelotes longipes.
