= Chinophrys taiwanensis =

Scientific classification
- Kingdom: Animalia
- Phylum: Arthropoda
- Subphylum: Chelicerata
- Class: Arachnida
- Order: Araneae
- Infraorder: Araneomorphae
- Family: Salticidae
- Genus: Chinophrys
- Species: C. taiwanensis

Binomial name
- Chinophrys taiwanensis (Peng & Li, 2002)

Synonyms
- Sitticus taiwanensis Peng & Li, 2002

Species of spider

Chinophrys taiwanensis is a species of jumping spiders.

== Description ==
The species is allied to C. wuae.

== Name ==
The species name is derived from the type locality.

== Distribution ==
C. taiwanensis is endemic to Taiwan.

== Literature ==
- Peng, Xian-Jin & Li, Shu-Qiang (2002): Four new and two newly recorded species of Taiwanese jumping spiders (Araneae: Salticidae) deposited in the United States. Zoological Studies 41(3): 337-345. PDF
