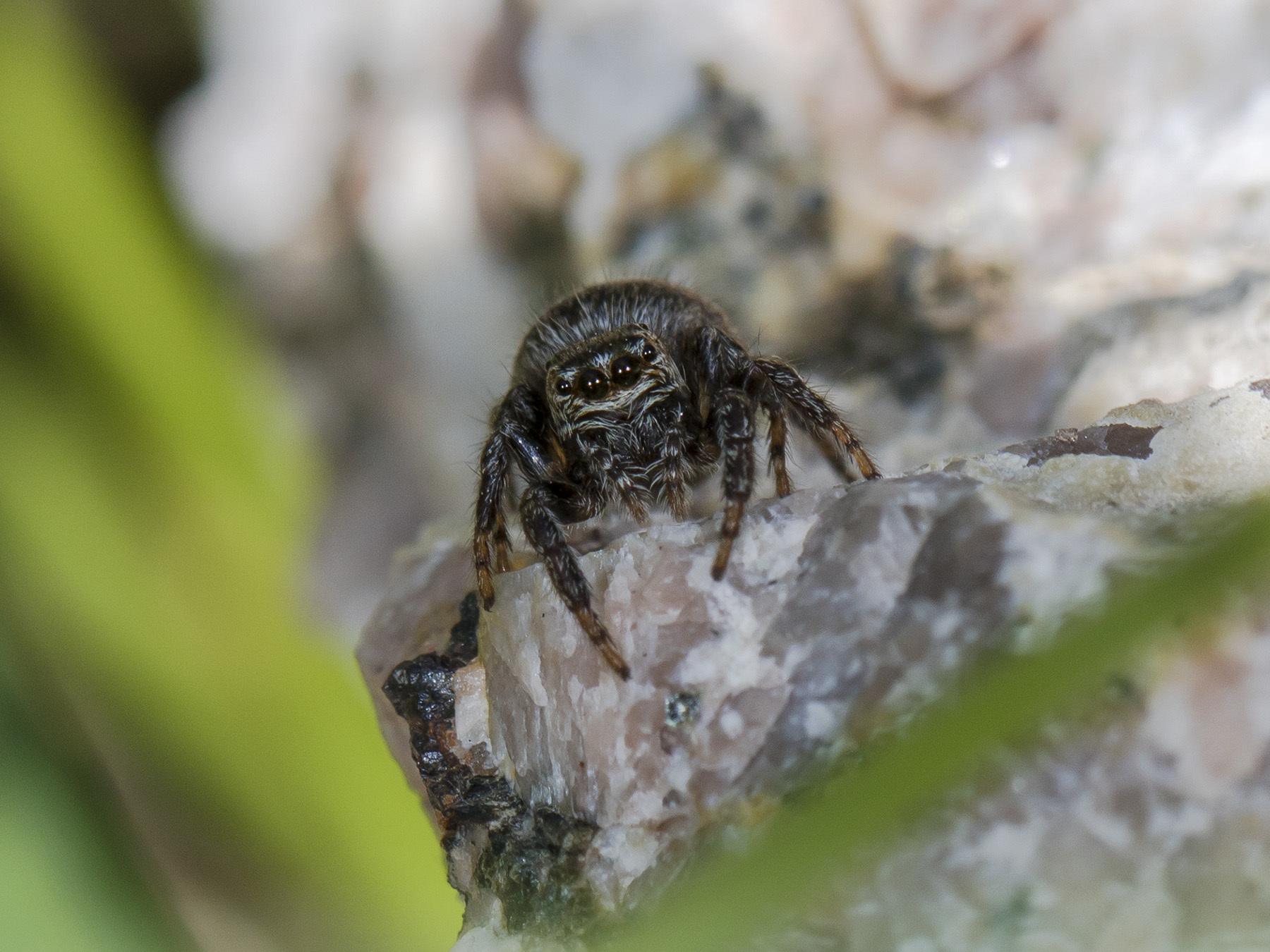
- The related Evarcha michailovi

Scientific classification
- Kingdom: Animalia
- Phylum: Arthropoda
- Subphylum: Chelicerata
- Class: Arachnida
- Order: Araneae
- Infraorder: Araneomorphae
- Family: Salticidae
- Genus: Evarcha
- Species: E. grandis

Binomial name
- Evarcha grandis Wesołowska & Russell-Smith, 2011

= Evarcha grandis =

Species of spider

Evarcha grandis is a species of jumping spider in the genus Evarcha that lives in Nigeria. The species was first described in 2011 by Wanda Wesołowska and Anthony Russell-Smith. It is larger than typically for the genus, which is reflected in the species name derived from the Latin word that means "large". The spider has a cephalothorax that is typically 3.6 mm (0.14 in) long and an abdomen 5.7 mm (0.22 in) long. It has a brown carapace with a black eye field and greyish-brown abdomen. It has long brown bristles on its clypeus, or face, and white lines on its cheeks. The spider's legs are dark brown. Apart from its size, the spider's copulatory organs are the most clear way to identify it. The female has pockets towards the midpoint, rather than the rear, of its epigyne, short insemination ducts and large spermathecae. The male has not been described.

== Taxonomy ==
Evarcha grandis is a species of jumping spider that was first described by Wanda Wesołowska and Anthony Russell-Smith in 2011. It was one of over 500 species identified by the Polish arachnologist Wesołowska during her career, making her one of the most prolific in the field. They allocated it to the genus Evarcha, first circumscribed by Eugène Simon in 1902. The genus is one of the largest genera of jumping spiders, with members found on four continents.

In 1976, Jerzy Prószyński placed the genus in the subfamily Pelleninae of the family Plexippoida, along with the genera Bianor and Pellenes. In Wayne Maddison's 2015 study of spider phylogenetic classification, the genus Evarcha was allocated to the subtribe Plexippina. This is a member of the tribe Plexippini, in the subclade Simonida in the clade Saltafresia. It is related to the genera Hyllus and Plexippus. Analysis of protein-coding genes showed it was particularly related to Telamonia. In the following year, Prószyński added the genus to a group of genera named Evarchines, named after the genus, along with Hasarinella and Nigorella based on similarities in the spiders' copulatory organs. The species is named after a Latin word that can be translated "large".

== Description ==
As its name suggests, Evarcha grandis is a large spider, with a body length of about 10 mm (0.39 in). It has a body that is divided into two main parts: an oval cephalothorax and an ovoid abdomen. The female has a cephalothorax that is typically 3.6 mm (0.14 in) long and 2.9 mm (0.11 in) wide. The carapace, the hard upper part of the cephalothorax, is moderately high. The top is brown and covered with delicate light hairs. There is a distinctive fovea, or indentation in the centre of the carapace. It has a darker eye field with very longer bristles near the eyes themselves. White hairs encircle some of the front eyes. The sides are darker with lighter hairs lining the edges. The underside, or sternum, is dark. The spider's face, or clypeus, is low and brown with a scattering of long brown bristles. The cheeks have four thin lines of white hairs. The spider's mouthparts are larger than most species in the genus. It has dark brown chelicerae with a single tooth visible. Its labium is a lighter brown with even lighter tips.

The spider's abdomen is larger than the carapace, measuring typically 5.7 mm (0.22 in) in length and 2.9 mm (0.11 in) in width. The top is a dark greyish-brown with light band that extends from the front edge to the sides and another at the back extending similarly. It is covered in iridescent hairs, amongst which are a few very long brown bristles. The underside is dark grey marked with four rows of small light dots. The spider's spinnerets are greyish-black. It has generally dark brown legs with brown hairs, some longer than others, and dark spines. It has dark orange pedipalps.

The spider's copulatory organs are unusual and, in addition to its large size, help distinguish the species from others in the genus. The female's epigyne has clear sclerotisation, particularly towards the wall at the very back of the central depression. There are two sizeable pockets at the sides of the depression. The positioning of the pockets in the epigyne, which are near the mid-point of epigyne when in most species in the genus they are to the rear, is a distinguishing feature for the species. The epigastric furrow, a ridge to the rear of the epigyne, is also clearly marked. The copulatory openings lead to very short insemination ducts and large bean-shaped spermathecae, or receptacles. The male has not been described.

== Distribution ==
Evarcha spiders live across the world, although those found in North America may be accidental migrants. Although the genus is found across Africa, Evarcha grandis is endemic to Nigeria. The female holotype was collected in Ibadan 1974.
