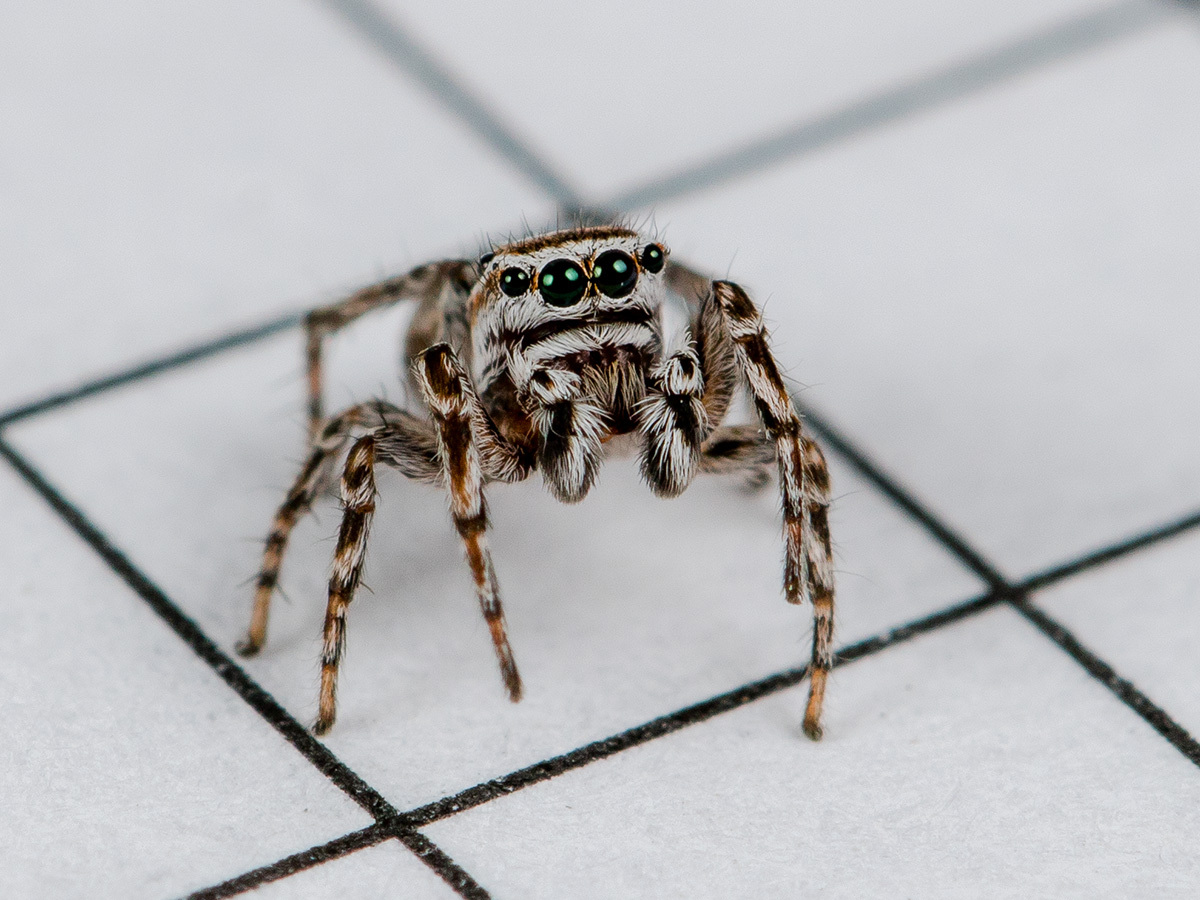
- Adult from Kazakhstan

Scientific classification
- Kingdom: Animalia
- Phylum: Arthropoda
- Subphylum: Chelicerata
- Class: Arachnida
- Order: Araneae
- Infraorder: Araneomorphae
- Family: Salticidae
- Genus: Attulus
- Species: A. nenilini

Binomial name
- Attulus nenilini (Logunov & Wesołowska, 1993)

= Attulus nenilini =

Species of jumping spider

Attulus nenilini is a species of jumping spider that was first found in Kazakhstan and subsequently in Kyrgyzstan, most frequently found on the floodplain of the Volga. Originally allocated to the genus Sitticus when it was first described in 1993, the species was moved to Attulus when the two genera were merged in 2017. It is a small spider, measuring between 3.3 and 5.4 mm in length, the female having a longer abdomen than the male with a different white pattern. The spider shares features with other members of the genus, including the presence of three teeth on the front margin of its jaws, or chelicerae. There are also white hairs on the part of its face known as its clypeus. Its copulatory organs help distinguish it from other species in the genus, particularly the presence of a small spike, or apophysis, on the palpal tibia of the male and the design of the female's epigyne, the visible, external part of its copulatory organs.

== Taxonomy and etymology ==
Attulus nenilini is a species of jumping spider, a member of the family Salticidae, that was first described in 1993 by the arachnologists Dmitry Logunov and Wanda Wesołowska. It is one of over 500 different species identified by Wesołowska in her career. The authors allocated the spider to the genus Sitticus with the name Sitticus nenilini. The spider is named after the Soviet arachnologist Andrei B. Nenilin. The holotype is stored at the Zoological Museum of Moscow University.

First circumscribed in 1901 by Eugène Simon, Sitticus was listed in the tribe Sitticini, also first described by Simon in the same year. This tribe was allocated in the clade Amycoida by Wayne Maddison. In 2017 Jerzy Prószyński merged the genus with the related genus Attulus based on the similarity of the holotype. As Attulus had been circumscribed by Simon in 1889 and was the senior name, this meant that the species became Attulus nenilini. Simon had himself recognised the similarity between the genera and had listed them both in a group called Sitticeae. Prószyński suggested that the genus is part of an informal group named Sitticines.

== Description ==
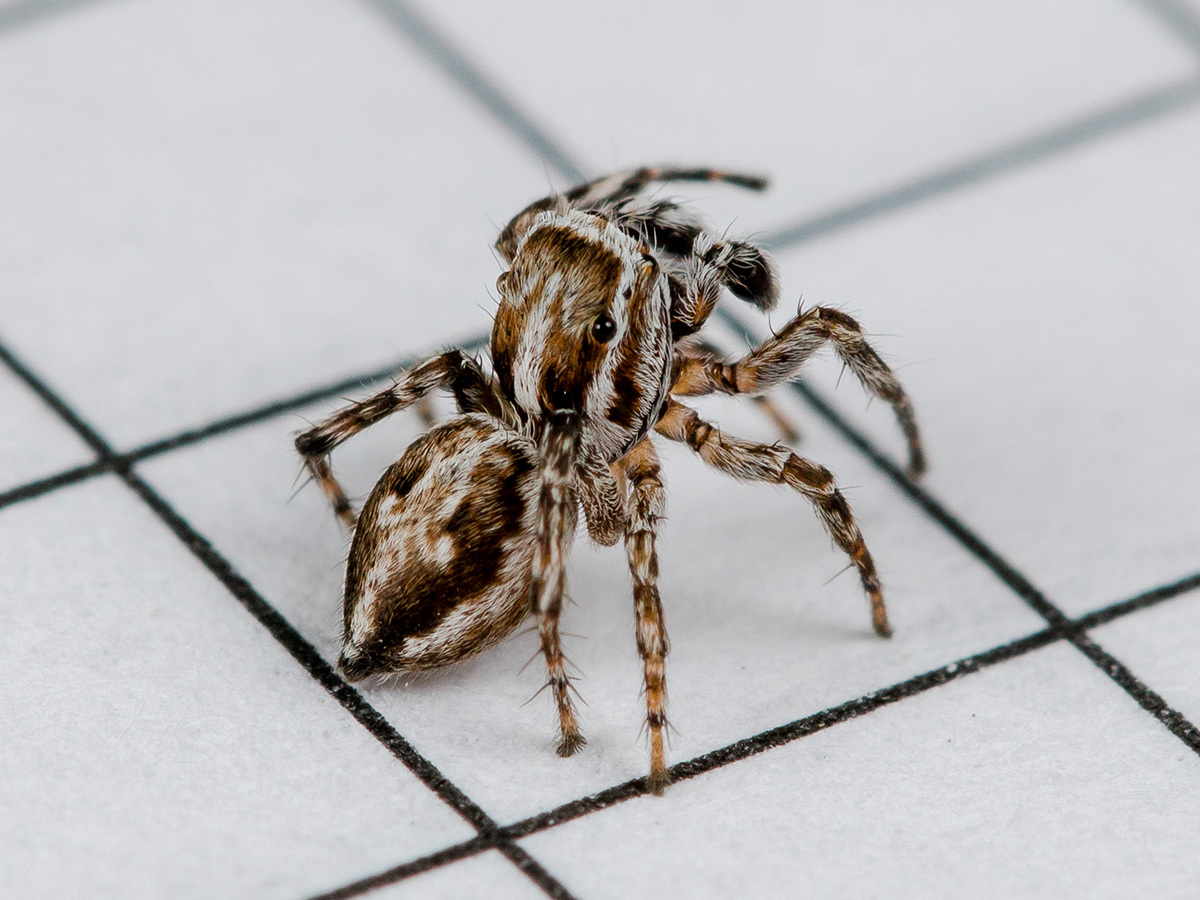
Another view of the adult from Kazakhstan

Attulus spiders are generally small. Attulus nenilini is similar to others in the genus. Its body is divided into two main parts, a cephalothorax that integrates its head to the front and, behind that, an elongated abdomen. The male has a cephalothorax that measures between 1.8 and 2.3 mm (0.071 and 0.091 in) long and 1.3 and 1.6 mm (0.051 and 0.063 in) wide. Its carapace, the hard upper part of the cephalothorax, is similar to the related Attulus talgarensis, although it is lighter, being mainly pale brown with a darker eye field. Some of its eyes are surrounded with black. Its sternum, the underside of its cephalothorax, is brownish-yellow and covered in white hairs. There are also white hairs on the part of its face known as its clypeus. The majority of its mouthparts, including its labium and maxillae, are brownish-yellow apart from its chelicerae, which act as its jaws, that are dark brown. It has teeth that are typical for the genus. This means that there are three teeth on its front margin and none behind them.

The male's abdomen is generally smaller than its cephalothorax, being between 1.5 and 2.05 mm (0.059 and 0.081 in) in length and 0.9 and 1.45 mm (0.035 and 0.057 in) in width. It is brown on top with a white pattern and grey underneath. The pattern is complex, consisting of a four white spots near the front, behind which lies a line of tessellating chevrons running down the middle. There are white patches towards the sides, each containing darker spots. The spider has greyish-brown spinnerets that it uses to spin webs. It has yellow legs that have brown patches, brown spines and brown or yellow hairs. There is a narrow line that runs down the front of them.

The female is similar in the size to the male with a slightly wider cephalothorax, measuring typically 1.65 mm (0.065 in), and a larger abdomen, typically 3.1 mm (0.12 in) long and 2.3 mm (0.091 in). Its carapace is similar to the male's but has brown and white hairs on it. Like the male, it has white hairs on its clypeus. Its sternum is yellowish, as is its maxillae. The remainder of its mouthparts are generally brown. Its abdomen is brownish with a white pattern that is different to the male's. The pattern consists of a central patch that has four arm-like features and a slightly wider area at the rear.

The spider has distinctive copulatory organs. It has a brown pedipalp that ends in a cymbium that has a stripe on it made of white hairs. Next to the cymbium is a smaller palpal bulb that includes a relatively flat tegulum, which contains a twisting seminal duct, and a relatively long embolus extending from the side and projecting into a depressed area in the cymbium. Beneath this is its palpal tibia, which has a small spike, or tibial apophysis, projecting upwards. The small size of the palpal tibia distinguishes the spider from others in the genus. The female, in contrast, has a distinctive epigyne, the visible, external part of its copulatory organs. It is oval with a large groove that runs from the middle to the rear where there is a channel known as the epigynal furrow. The edges of this groove make large deep pockets. There are two copulatory openings in the epigyne that lead via relatively short meandering insemination ducts to round spermathecae, or receptacles.

== Distribution and habitat ==
Attulus spiders are the only members of Amycoida that are found in Africa, Europe and Asia. They are mainly found in the area between Europe and Siberia. Attulus nenilini lives in Kazakhstan and Kyrgyzstan. The holotype was found in the Ustyurt Nature Reserve on the Ustyurt plateau in Kazakhstan in 1989. It has also been seen in other parts of western Kazakhstan and Kyrgyzstan, although it is not found northwest of the confluence of the Ural and Volga rivers. It is more common in the floodplain of the Volga. It has also been seen in the hilly sands that overlook the villages of the region living under tamarisk bushes.
