= Azas (disambiguation) =

Azas can refer to:

- Azas, Haute-Garonne, France
- Todzha Lake, also known as Azas Lake, Russia
- Azas Plateau, Russia
