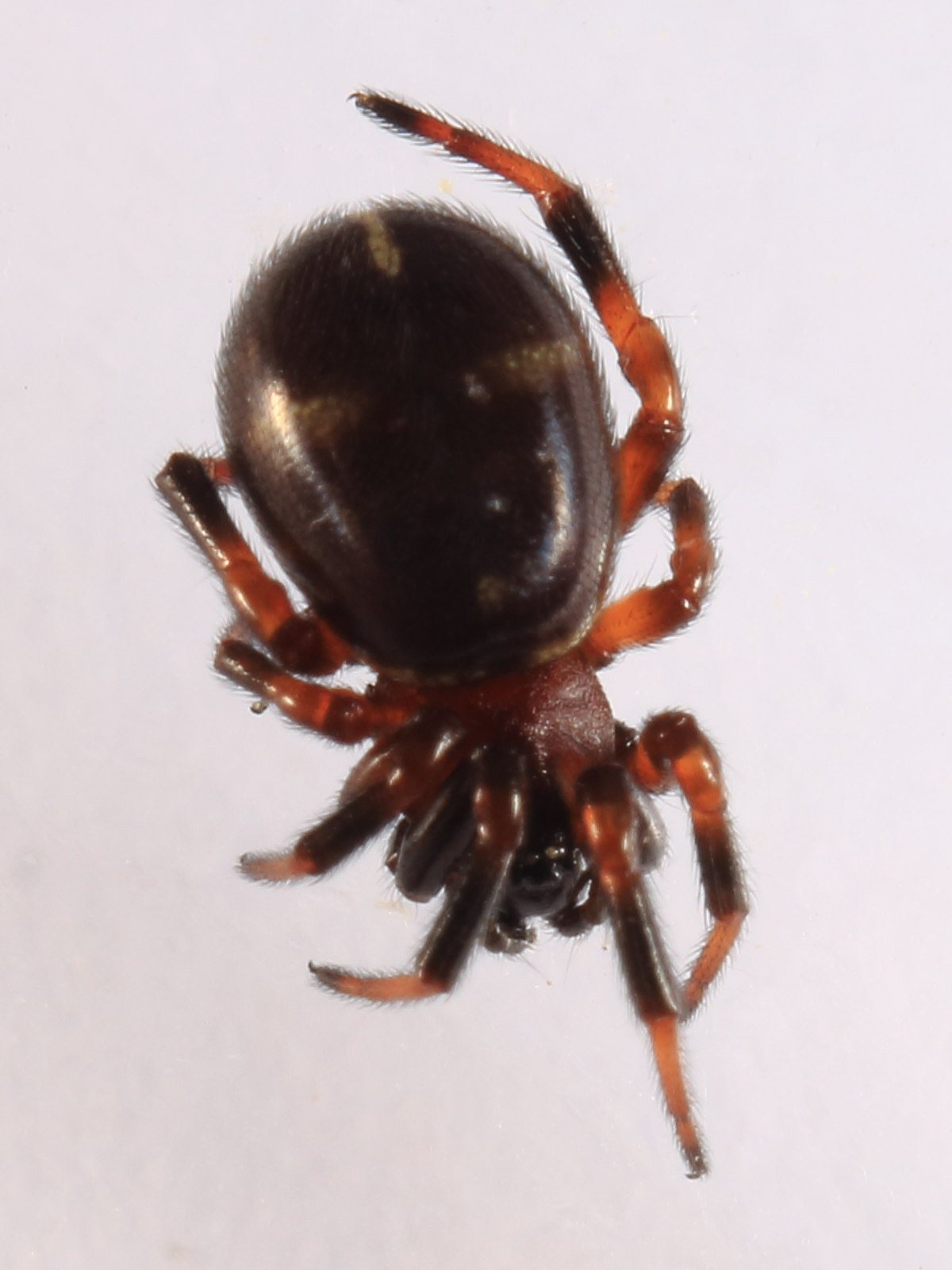
- Asagena phalerata

Scientific classification
- Kingdom: Animalia
- Phylum: Arthropoda
- Subphylum: Chelicerata
- Class: Arachnida
- Order: Araneae
- Infraorder: Araneomorphae
- Family: Theridiidae
- Genus: Asagena; Sundevall, 1833

Type species
- A. phalerata (Panzer, 1801)

Species
- 9, see text

= Asagena =

Genus of spiders

Asagena is a genus of comb-footed spiders (family Theridiidae) that was first described by Carl Jakob Sundevall in 1833.

== Species ==
As of May 2020 it contains nine species, found in North America, Europe, Asia, and Algeria:

- Asagena americana Emerton, 1882 – Canada, USA, Mexico, China
- Asagena brignolii (Knoflach, 1996) – Greece
- Asagena fulva (Keyserling, 1884) – USA, Mexico
- Asagena italica (Knoflach, 1996) – France (incl. Corsica), Switzerland, Italy, Algeria
- Asagena medialis (Banks, 1898) – USA, Mexico
- Asagena meridionalis Kulczyński, 1894 – Central to south-eastern and eastern Europe, Georgia
- Asagena phalerata (Panzer, 1801) (type) – Europe, Turkey, Caucasus, Russia (Europe to Far East), Kazakhstan, Iran, Central Asia, China, Korea
- Asagena pulcher (Keyserling, 1884) – USA
- Asagena semideserta (Ponomarev, 2005) – Kazakhstan, Mongolia

In synonymy:

- A. amurica Strand, 1907 = Asagena phalerata (Panzer, 1801)
- A. nesiotes = Asagena fulva (Keyserling, 1884)
- A. parvula = Asagena fulva (Keyserling, 1884)
- A. phalerata = Asagena phalerata (Panzer, 1801)
- A. phalerata = Asagena phalerata (Panzer, 1801)
- A. venusta = Asagena fulva (Keyserling, 1884)
