= Chinophrys trifasciata =

Scientific classification
- Kingdom: Animalia
- Phylum: Arthropoda
- Subphylum: Chelicerata
- Class: Arachnida
- Order: Araneae
- Infraorder: Araneomorphae
- Family: Salticidae
- Genus: Chinophrys
- Species: C. trifasciata

Binomial name
- Chinophrys trifasciata Wesołowska, Azarkina & Russell-Smith, 2014

Species of jumping spider

Chinophrys trifasciata is a jumping spider species in the genus Chinophrys that lives in South Africa. Only the male has been described. It is a medium-sized spider, with a dark brown forward part of its body, its cephalothorax, that is between 1.5 and 2.2 mm (0.059 and 0.087 in) long, and, behind this, a yellowish-brown abdomen that is between 1.2 and 2.4 mm (0.047 and 0.094 in) long. The spider has a black eye field and a hard black scutum that covers half of the top of its abdomen. It has white stripes on its face, which are recalled in its specific name. It has dark brown legs and yellow pedipalps. Its copulatory organs include a narrow embolus circles out and away from its bulging palpal bulb.

== Taxonomy and etymology ==
Chinophrys trifasciata is a species of jumping spider, a member of the family Salticidae, that was first described by the arachnologists Wanda Wesołowska, Galina Azarkina and Anthony Russell-Smith in 2014. They allocated the species to the genus Chinophrys, which had been first described by Junxia Zhang and Wayne Maddison in 2012. In Maddison's 2015 study of spider phylogenetic classification, the genus Chinophrys was identified as a member of the tribe Euophryini. Zhang and Maddison noted that it is closely related to the members of the tribe that are found in the Americas. The tribe is a member of the clade Saltafresia. In 2017, Jerzy Prószyński placed the genus in an informal group called euophryines.

The specific name refers to the white stripes on its cheeks. The genus is a combination of two words, "Chin", which means "of China" and "ophrys", which relates to the genus Euophrys that has similar patterns on its body.

== Description ==
Chinophrys trifasciata is a medium-sized spider. The forward part of the male's body, its cephalothorax, is between 1.5 and 2.2 mm (0.059 and 0.087 in) long and between 1.0 and 1.5 mm (0.039 and 0.059 in) wide. Its carapace, the hard upper part of the cephalothorax, is high and dark brown. Its eye field is darker, nearly black, with small white scales and brown bristles near its foremost eyes. There is a light stripe running down the middle of its carapace. The part of the underside of its cephalothorax known as its sternum is yellowish-brown. Its face, or clypeus, is low and brown with a white stripe at the base of the spider's chelicerae. There are also white hairs formed into three parallel lines on its "cheeks". Its chelicerae are brown with some white hairs visible on them. There are four teeth on its front edge and one, which has five to seven cusps, towards the rear.

Behind its cephalothorax, the spider has a yellowish-brown abdomen that is between 1.2 and 2.4 mm (0.047 and 0.094 in) long and between 0.9 and 1.2 mm (0.035 and 0.047 in) wide. There is a hard black scutum that covers half of the top of its abdomen. The remainder is covered in a mosaic pattern of grey stains on a lighter background. The underside of its abdomen is spotted. The spider has dark brown legs. Its first pair of legs is larger than the remainder and has dark brown hairs and leg spines. It has yellow pedipalps, sexual organs near its face, which are covered in white hairs, interspersed with a small number of dark brown bristles. The male's pedipalp ends in a tibia that has a spike, or tibial apophysis, that extends up and into a valley inits cymbium. Attached to the smooth cymbium is a bulging palpal bulb. A wide seminal duct undulates within the bulb and, at the top, a narrow embolus circles out and away from the bulb. The female has not been described.

== Distribution ==
Chinophrys trifasciata was the first member of the genus that was found in Africa. It is found only in South Africa. It is presently known only from the Table Mountain National Park in the Western Cape Province, where it has been sampled from two localities.

== Habitat and ecology ==
The species in a ground-dweller at altitudes ranging from 453 to 1,069 m (1,486 to 3,507 ft) above sea level. It has been sampled from pitfall traps in the Fynbos Biome.

== Conservation ==
The status of the species remains obscure. A range-restricted species that is well protected, it is listed as Rare. There are no significant threats to the spider, but due to its restricted range, more sampling is needed to collect the female and more accurately determine its distribution range.
