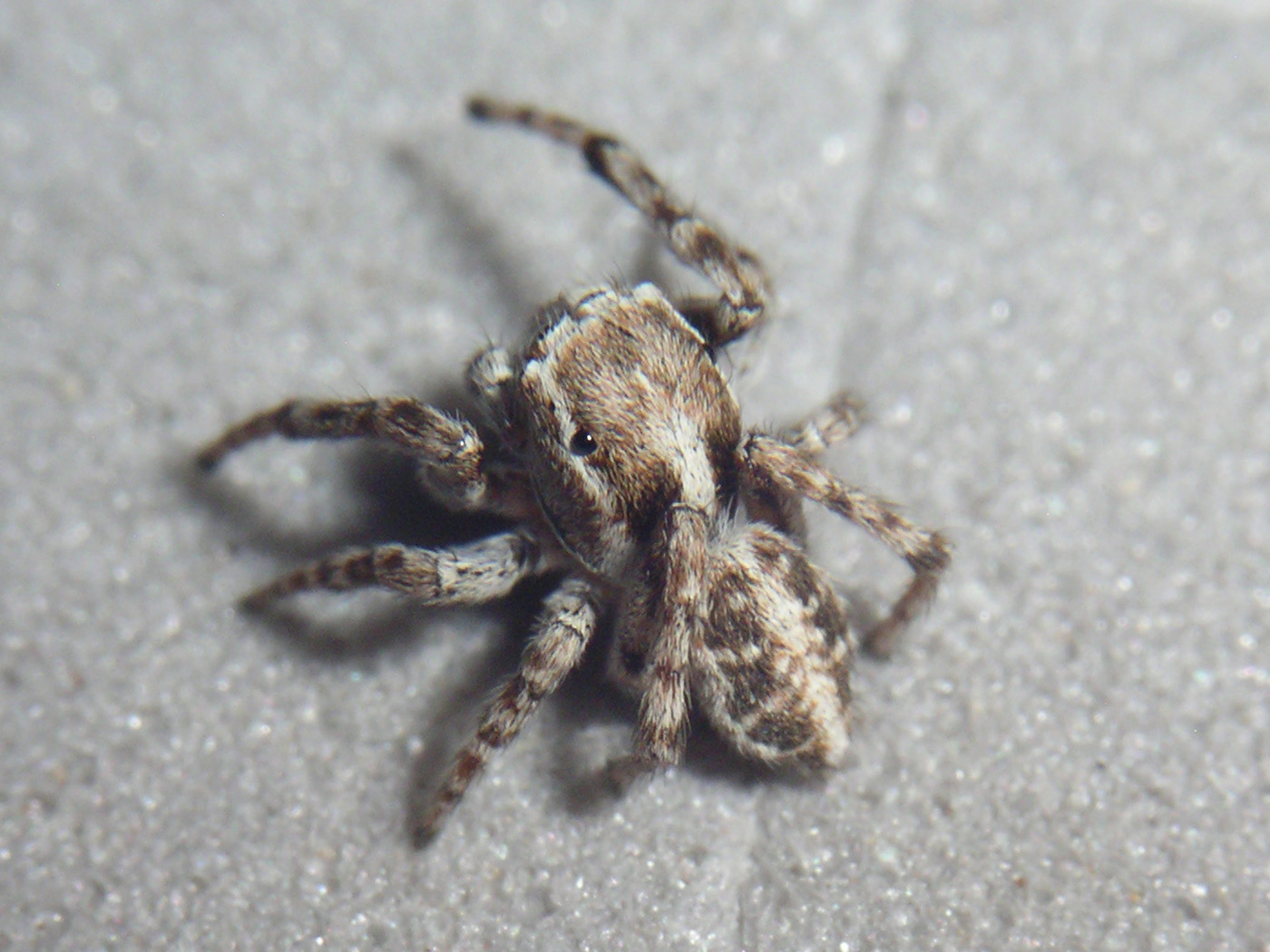
- Male Attulus ammophilus

Scientific classification
- Kingdom: Animalia
- Phylum: Arthropoda
- Subphylum: Chelicerata
- Class: Arachnida
- Order: Araneae
- Infraorder: Araneomorphae
- Family: Salticidae
- Tribe: Sitticini
- Genus: Attulus; Simon, 1889

Type species
- Attus distinguendus Simon, 1868

Species
- 58, see text

Synonyms
- Calositticus Lohmander, 1944; Hypositticus Lohmander, 1944; Sitticulus Dahl, 1926; Sitticus Simon, 1901; Sittiflor Prószyński, 2017; Sittilong Prószyński, 2017; Sittipub Prószyński, 2016

= Attulus =

Genus of spiders

Attulus is a genus of jumping spiders that was first described by Eugène Louis Simon in 1889. The name is a diminutive form of a common prefix for salticid genera, -attus.

== Taxonomy ==
In 1889, Eugène Simon separated the genus Attulus from the genus Attus. The correct name of the type species involves some taxonomic complexity. Simon gave Attus cinereus Westring, 1861 as the type of the genus. However, this name had already been used by Walckenaer in 1837 for a different species, so Simon's 1871 replacement name Attus helveolus is used instead. A. helveolus is now regarded as the same species as Attus distinguendus, described by Simon in 1868, so having priority as a name. Thus the type species is currently known as Attulus distinguendus.

Within the family Salticidae, Attulus is placed in the tribe Sitticini (the sitticines). The taxonomy of the tribe and the genus Attulus has been subject to considerable uncertainty; some species changed genus repeatedly between 2017 and 2020. For example, Attulus floricola was known as Sitticus floricola until moved to Sittiflor floricola in 2017, to Calositticus floricola in 2018, back to Sitticus floricola in 2019, and then to Attulus floricola in 2020. Most sitticines were placed in Sitticus until 2017, when Jerzy Prószyński split the genus into seven: Attulus, Sitticus and five new genera Sittiab, Sittiflor, Sittilong, Sittipub and Sittisax. This division was not based on a phylogenetic analysis but was intended to be "pragmatic". A molecular phylogenetic analysis in 2020 restored most sitticine species to a single genus. Although Sitticus had been used in this sense for a long time, Attulus Simon, 1889 has priority over Sitticus Simon, 1901, so is the name currently used. Attulus is circumscribed to include Sitticus, Sittiflor, Sittilong and Sittipub. (Prószyński's Sittisax was retained, but his Sittiab was synonymized with Attinella.)

=== Phylogeny ===
In 2020, Wayne Maddison and co-workers divided the tribe Sitticini into two subtribes, Aillutticina and Sitticina. Attulus was placed in Sitticina, and divided into three subgenera, A. (Sittilong) with one species, A. (Sitticus) with seven species, and A. (Attulus) with 41 species. The relationship between these taxa is shown in the following cladogram.

- Sitticini
  - Aillutticina
    Five Neotropical genera
  - Sitticina
    - Jollas–Tomis clade (Attinella, Jollas, Sittisax, Tomis)
    - Attulus
      - Attulus (Sittilong)
      - - Attulus (Sitticus)
        - Attulus (Attulus)

=== Species ===
As of August 2020, the World Spider Catalog recognized 58 species in the genus Attulus. They are found in Asia, Europe and North America:

- Attulus albolineatus (Kulczyński, 1895) – Russia (South Siberia to Far East), China, Korea
- Attulus ammophilus (Thorell, 1875) – Romania, Russia (Europe), Ukraine, Turkey, Iran, Kazakhstan, Central Asia, Afghanistan. Introduced to North America
- Attulus ansobicus (Andreeva, 1976) – Kazakhstan, Central Asia
- Attulus atricapillus (Simon, 1882) – Europe, Turkey
- Attulus avocator (O. Pickard-Cambridge, 1885) – Kazakhstan, Central Asia, China, Korea, Japan
- Attulus barsakelmes (Logunov & Rakov, 1998) – Russia (Europe), Kazakhstan
- Attulus burjaticus (Danilov & Logunov, 1994) – Russia (South Siberia)
- Attulus caricis (Westring, 1861) – Europe, Turkey, Caucasus, Russia (Europe to Far East), Kazakhstan, Mongolia
- Attulus cautus (Peckham & Peckham, 1888) – Mexico
- Attulus clavator (Schenkel, 1936) – China
- Attulus cutleri (Prószyński, 1980) – North America, Russia (Middle Siberia to Far East)
- Attulus damini (Chyzer, 1891) – Southern Europe, Ukraine, Russia (Caucasus)
- Attulus diductus (O. Pickard-Cambridge, 1885) – Karakorum, China
- Attulus distinguendus (Simon, 1868) (type) – Europe, Turkey, Caucasus, Russia (Europe to Far East), Kazakhstan, China
- Attulus dubatolovi (Logunov & Rakov, 1998) – Kazakhstan
- Attulus dudkoi (Logunov, 1998) – Russia (South Siberia)
- Attulus dyali (Roewer, 1951) – Pakistan
- Attulus dzieduszyckii (L. Koch, 1870) – Europe, Russia (Europe, West Siberia)
- Attulus eskovi (Logunov & Wesołowska, 1995) – Russia (Far East)
- Attulus fasciger (Simon, 1880) – Russia (Middle Siberia to Far East), China, Korea, Japan. Introduced to North America
- Attulus finschi (L. Koch, 1879) – USA, Canada, Russia (West Siberia to Far East)
- Attulus floricola (C. L. Koch, 1837) – Canada, USA, Europe, Caucasus, Russia (Europe to Far East), Kazakhstan, Central Asia, China, Japan
- Attulus godlewskii (Kulczyński, 1895) – Russia (Middle Siberia to Far East), China, Korea, Japan. Introduced to North America
- Attulus goricus (Ovtsharenko, 1978) – Caucasus (Russia, Georgia)
- Attulus hirokii Ono & Ogata, 2018 – Japan
- Attulus inexpectus (Logunov & Kronestedt, 1997) – Europe, Turkey, Azerbaijan, Russia (Europe to West Siberia), Kazakhstan, Central Asia
- Attulus inopinabilis (Logunov, 1992) – Ukraine, Russia (Urals), Kazakhstan, Kyrgyzstan
- Attulus japonicus (Kishida, 1910) – Japan
- Attulus karakumensis (Logunov, 1992) – Iran, Turkmenistan
- Attulus kazakhstanicus (Logunov, 1992) – Kazakhstan
- Attulus longipes (Canestrini, 1873) – Alps (France, Italy, Switzerland, Austria)
- Attulus mirandus (Logunov, 1993) – Kazakhstan, Central Asia, Russia (South Siberia), China
- Attulus monstrabilis (Logunov, 1992) – Kazakhstan, Kyrgyzstan
- Attulus montanus Kishida, 1910) – Japan
- Attulus nakamurae (Kishida, 1910) – Japan
- Attulus nenilini (Logunov & Wesolowska, 1993) – Kazakhstan, Kyrgyzstan
- Attulus nitidus (Hu, 2001) – China
- Attulus niveosignatus (Simon, 1880) – Nepal to China
- Attulus penicillatus (Simon, 1875) – Europe, Caucasus, Russia (Europe to Far East), Kazakhstan, China, Korea, Japan
- Attulus penicilloides (Wesolowska, 1981) – North Korea
- Attulus pubescens (Fabricius, 1775) – Europe, Turkey, Caucasus, Afghanistan. Introduced to USA
- Attulus pulchellus (Logunov, 1992) – Kazakhstan, Kyrgyzstan
- Attulus relictarius (Logunov, 1998) – Caucasus (Russia, Georgia, Azerbaijan), Iran
- Attulus rivalis (Simon, 1937) – France
- Attulus rupicola (C. L. Koch, 1837) – Europe
- Attulus saevus (Dönitz & Strand, 1906) – Japan
- Attulus saganus (Dönitz & Strand, 1906) – Japan
- Attulus saltator (O. Pickard-Cambridge, 1868) – Europe, Turkey, Russia (Europe to South Siberia), Kazakhstan
- Attulus sinensis (Schenkel, 1963) – China, Korea?
- Attulus striatus (Emerton, 1911) – USA, Canada
- Attulus subadultus (Dönitz & Strand, 1906) – Japan
- Attulus sylvestris (Emerton, 1891) – Canada, USA
- Attulus talgarensis (Logunov & Wesolowska, 1993) – Kazakhstan, Kyrgyzstan
- Attulus tannuolana (Logunov, 1991) – Russia (South Siberia)
- Attulus terebratus (Clerck, 1757) – Europe, Turkey, Caucasus, Russia (Europe to South Siberia), Kazakhstan, Mongolia
- Attulus vilis (Kulczyński, 1895) – Ukraine, Russia (Europe), Turkey, Caucasus, Iran, Kazakhstan, Central Asia
- Attulus zaisanicus (Logunov, 1998) – Kazakhstan
- Attulus zimmermanni Simon, 1877 – Europe, Turkey, Azerbaijan, Russia (Europe to South Siberia), Kazakhstan, Turkmenistan
