= Chinophrys wuae =

Scientific classification
- Kingdom: Animalia
- Phylum: Arthropoda
- Subphylum: Chelicerata
- Class: Arachnida
- Order: Araneae
- Infraorder: Araneomorphae
- Family: Salticidae
- Genus: Chinophrys
- Species: C. wuae

Binomial name
- Chinophrys wuae (Peng, Tso & Li, 2002)

Synonyms
- Sitticus wuae Peng, Tso & Li, 2002

Species of spider

Chinophrys wuae is a species of jumping spider, named after the collector Hai-Yin Wu. C. wuae is similar to Attulus penicillatus, and is only known from Taiwan.
