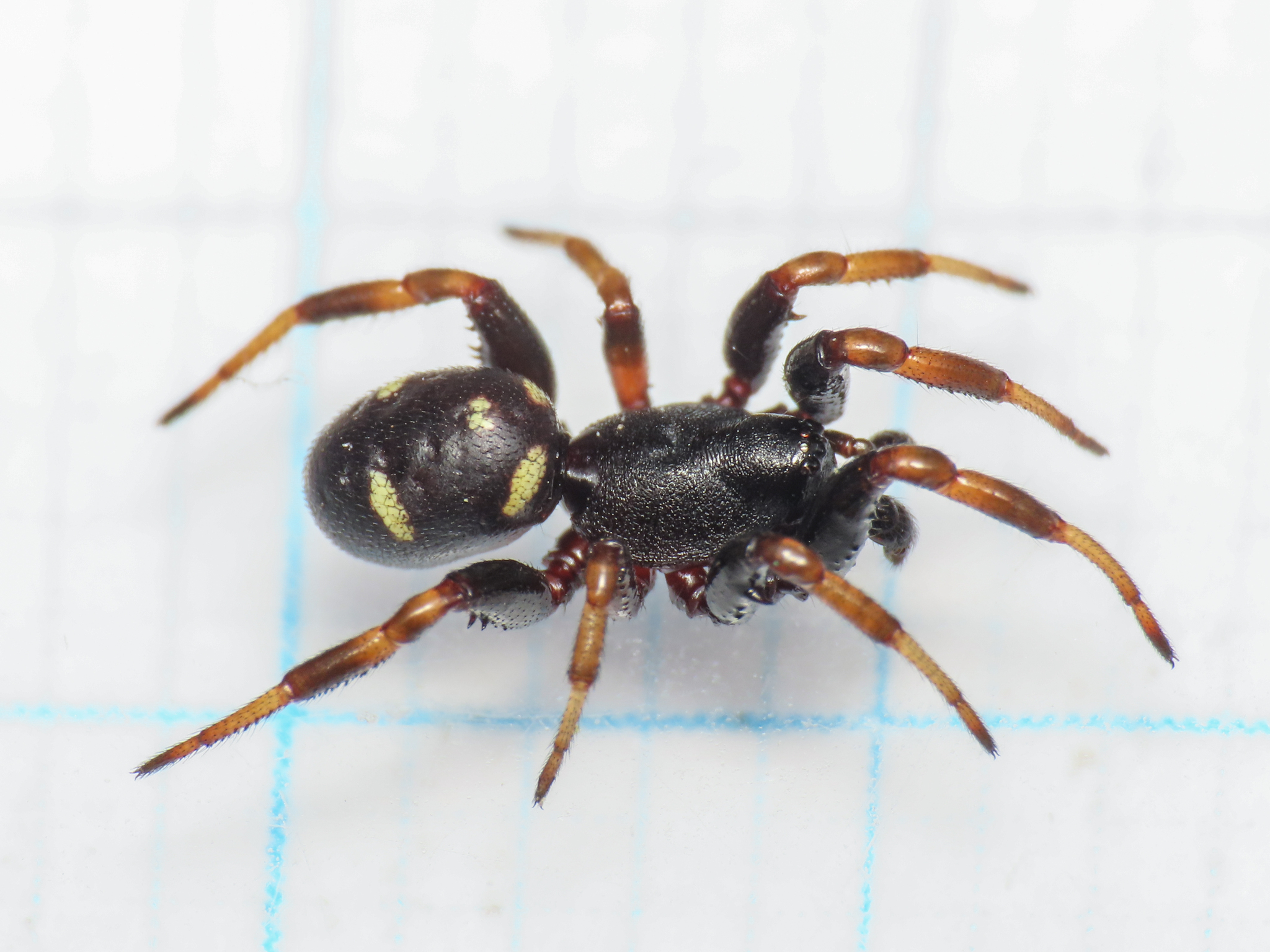

Scientific classification
- Domain: Eukaryota
- Kingdom: Animalia
- Phylum: Arthropoda
- Subphylum: Chelicerata
- Class: Arachnida
- Order: Araneae
- Infraorder: Araneomorphae
- Family: Theridiidae
- Genus: Asagena
- Species: A. italica

Binomial name
- Asagena italica (Knoflach, 1996)

= Asagena italica =

Species of spider

Asagena italica is a species of cobweb spider in the family Theridiidae. It is found in France, Switzerland, Italy, and Algeria. They are typically found in olive groves and farmland.
