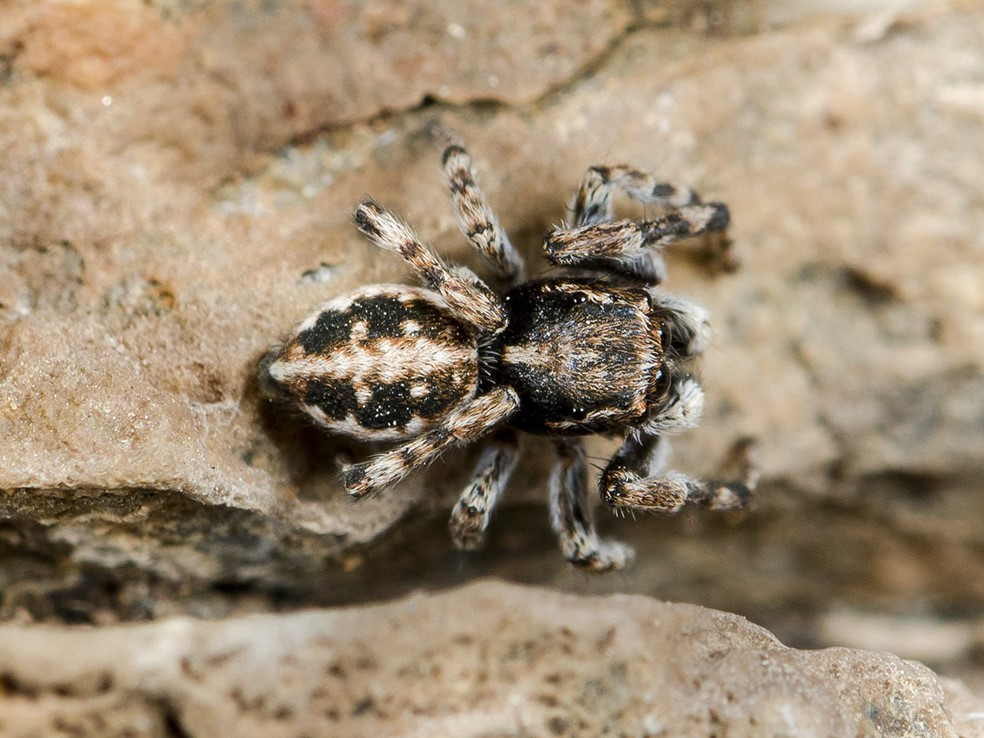
- Siberian morph

Scientific classification
- Kingdom: Animalia
- Phylum: Arthropoda
- Subphylum: Chelicerata
- Class: Arachnida
- Order: Araneae
- Infraorder: Araneomorphae
- Family: Salticidae
- Genus: Attulus
- Species: A. distinguendus

Binomial name
- Attulus distinguendus (Simon, 1868)

Synonyms
- Attus cinereus Westring, 1861 (invalid; preoccupied by Walckenaer, 1837); Euophrys cinerea (Westring, 1861) (invalid); Attulus cinereus (Westring, 1861) (invalid); Attus distinguendus Simon, 1868; Attulus distinguendus (Simon, 1868); Sitticus distinguendus (Simon, 1868); Attus helveolus Simon, 1871 (replacement name for Attus cinereus); Attulus helveolus (Simon, 1871); Sitticus helveolus (Simon, 1871); Attus histrio Simon, 1875; Attulus histrio (Simon, 1875); Attus psammodes Thorell, 1875; Sitticus psammodes (Thorell, 1875); Attus solaris Menge, 1877; Attus ruficarpus Simon, 1884; Attulus ruficarpus (Simon, 1884); Sitticus numeratus Bösenberg & Strand, 1906; Sitticus paraviduus Schenkel, 1963

= Attulus distinguendus =

Species of spider

Attulus distinguendus, also called the distinguished jumper spider, is a species of spider in the family Salticidae, the jumping spiders. Until 2017, it was placed in the genus Sitticus. It inhabits central and western Europe, the Palaearctic region, and eastern Asia.

== Description ==
The spider has four forward-facing eyes (two small ones on the sides, two large ones in the middle). Jumping spiders have good vision, second only to cephalopods among invertebrates. The species are grey coloured with brown dots.

== Taxonomy ==
In 1889, Eugène Simon separated the genus Attulus from the genus Attus. Simon gave Attus cinereus Westring, 1861 as the type of the genus. However, this name had already been used by Walckenaer in 1837 for a different species, so Simon's 1871 replacement name Attus helveolus is used instead. A. helveolus is now regarded as the same species as Attus distinguendus, described by Simon in 1868, so having priority as a name. Thus Attulus distinguendus (under the original name Attus distinguendus) is the type of the genus.

== Distribution ==
The species has a Palearctic distribution. It is found in only two UK regions: North Kent, and South Essex. The species can also be found in countries like: Austria, Belgium, the Czech Republic, France, Germany, Hungary, Norway, Poland, Sweden, Switzerland, Romania and the Netherlands. The species have also been recorded from Japan, the city of Shanxi and the South Yakutia.

== Ecology and habitat ==
The species prefers dry climate with a limited amount of vegetation. It lives in cement and stony clinker, and can be found in pulverised fuel ash as well. The spider feed in areas with a high salt concentration, which it finds on halophytic plants such as Salicornia.

== Threat level ==
The species are considered to be endangered in the Czech Republic, Norway, and in Flanders, Belgium. The species gained vulnerable status in Poland. The species are almost wiped out in Serbia.
