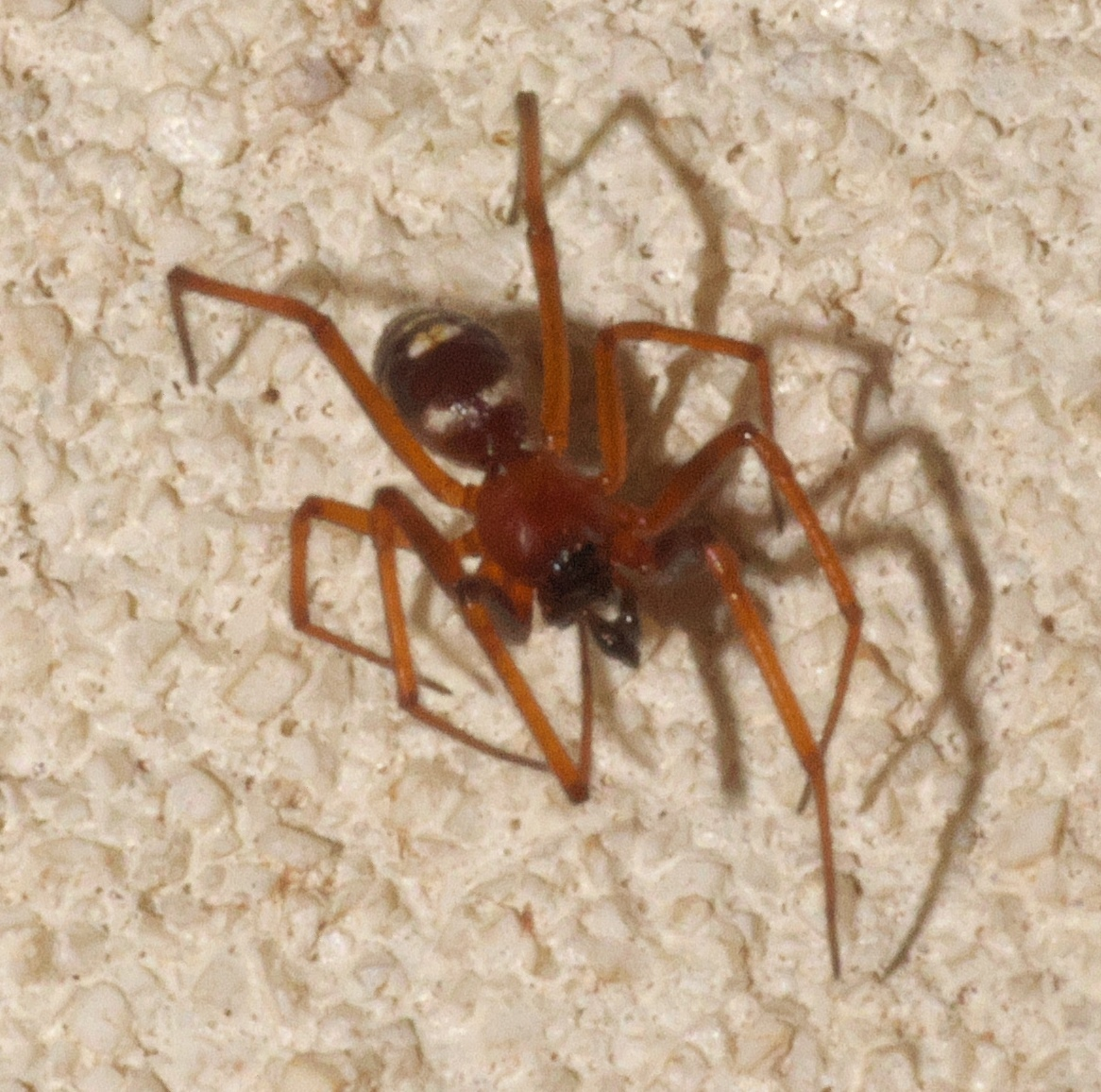
- Asagena medialis, Utah

Scientific classification
- Domain: Eukaryota
- Kingdom: Animalia
- Phylum: Arthropoda
- Subphylum: Chelicerata
- Class: Arachnida
- Order: Araneae
- Infraorder: Araneomorphae
- Family: Theridiidae
- Genus: Asagena
- Species: A. medialis

Binomial name
- Asagena medialis (Banks, 1898)

= Asagena medialis =

Species of spider

Asagena medialis is a species of cobweb spider in the family Theridiidae. It is found in the United States and Mexico.
