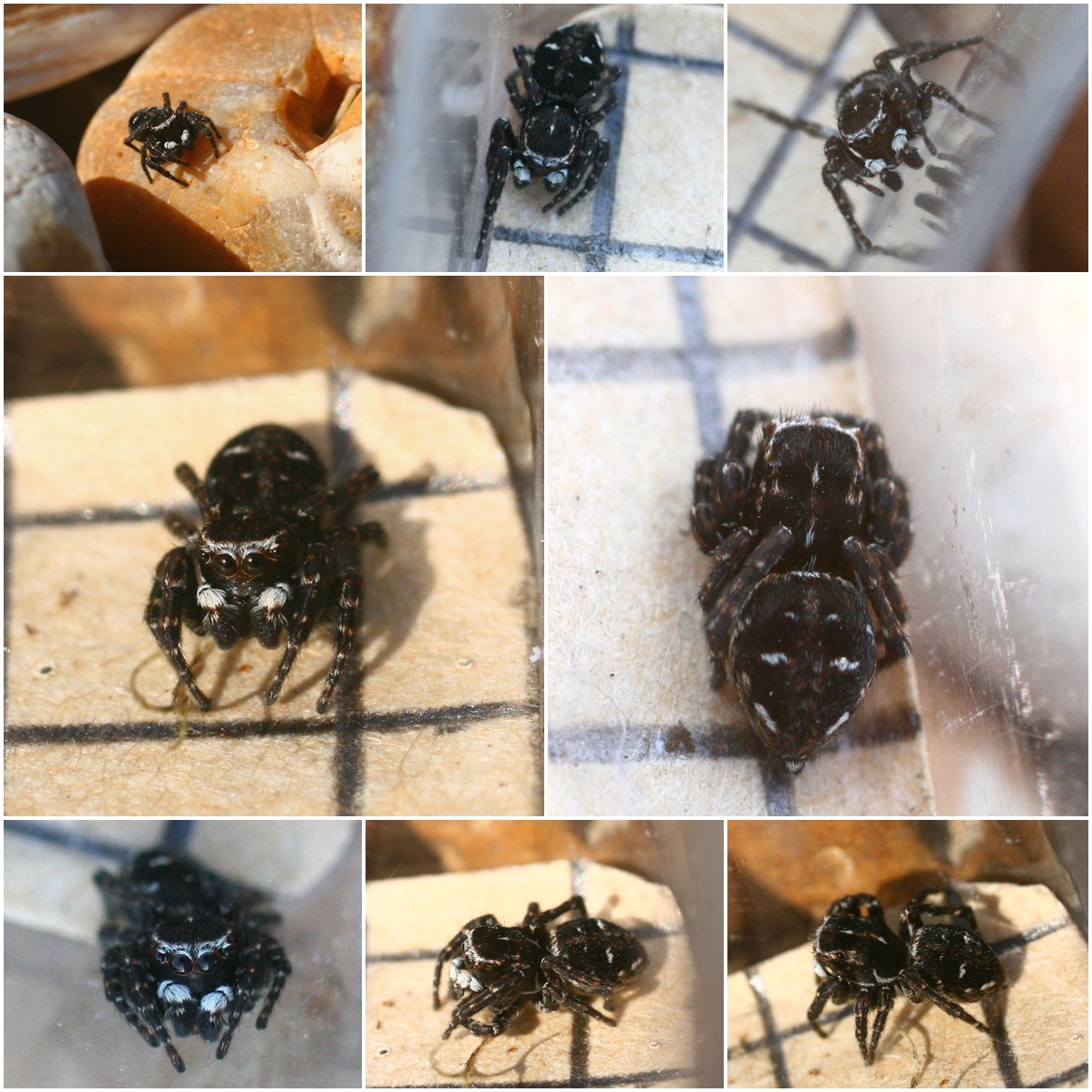

Scientific classification
- Kingdom: Animalia
- Phylum: Arthropoda
- Subphylum: Chelicerata
- Class: Arachnida
- Order: Araneae
- Infraorder: Araneomorphae
- Family: Salticidae
- Genus: Attulus
- Species: A. inexpectus

Binomial name
- Attulus inexpectus Logunov & Kronestedt, 1997

Synonyms
- Sitticus inexpectus Logunov & Kronestedt, 1997; Calositticus inexpectus Logunov & Kronestedt, 1997; Sittiflor inexpectus Prószyński, 2017

= Attulus inexpectus =

Species of spider

Attulus inexpectus is a species of spider from family Salticidae, found in from Europe (including southern England) to central Asia. It was previously misidentified as Attulus rupicola (syn. Sitticus rupicola).

Until 2017, it was placed in the genus Sitticus.

== Description ==
Attulus inexpectus females have a body length of about 6–7 mm (0.24–0.28 in), males being slightly smaller at about 4–5 mm (0.16–0.20 in). The fourth leg is the longest, about 5.5 mm (0.22 in) in females and about 4 mm (0.16 in) in males. Both sexes are generally brown to dark brown in overall coloration, males being darker than females. Both the carapace and abdomen have stripes and patterns formed by whitish or otherwise paler hairs, the carapace pattern being more distinct in males, with three longitudinal whitish stripes and a similarly coloured lateral border with the posterior part having a short line extending inwards.

== Taxonomy ==
Attulus inexpectus was first described in 1997 by Dimitri Logunov and Torbjörn Kronestedt (as Sitticus inexpectus). The specific name inexpectus means "unexpected"; the species was separated from Calositticus rupicola (then Sitticus rupicola), the authors stating, for example, that all spiders previously identified as S. rupicola in England were in fact the new species A. inexpectus (then Sitticus inexpectus). The two species can be distinguished by the pattern of white hairs on the carapace of the male – in C. inexpectus there is usually a short white stripe extending inwards from the posterior part of the carapace, and by the detailed shapes of the male palpal bulb and the internal female genitalia. A. inexpectus is a lowland species, whereas A. rupicola is found at higher altitudes.

The species was transferred from Sitticus to the new genus Sittiflor in 2017, but this was later discovered to be pre-empted by Calositticus. In 2020, the genus was synonymized with the genus Attulus .

== Distribution and habitat ==
Attulus inexpectus is found from southern England through central and northern Europe (Germany, Austria, Sweden, Poland, Estonia and Russia) to central Asia (Kazakhstan and Kyrgyzstan). It is a lowland species (thus contrasting with A. rupicola), typically found near to water, either coastal or inland. In southern England, where the species is found from April to October, it lives in coastal shingle and tidal litter, often adjacent to saltmarshes.
