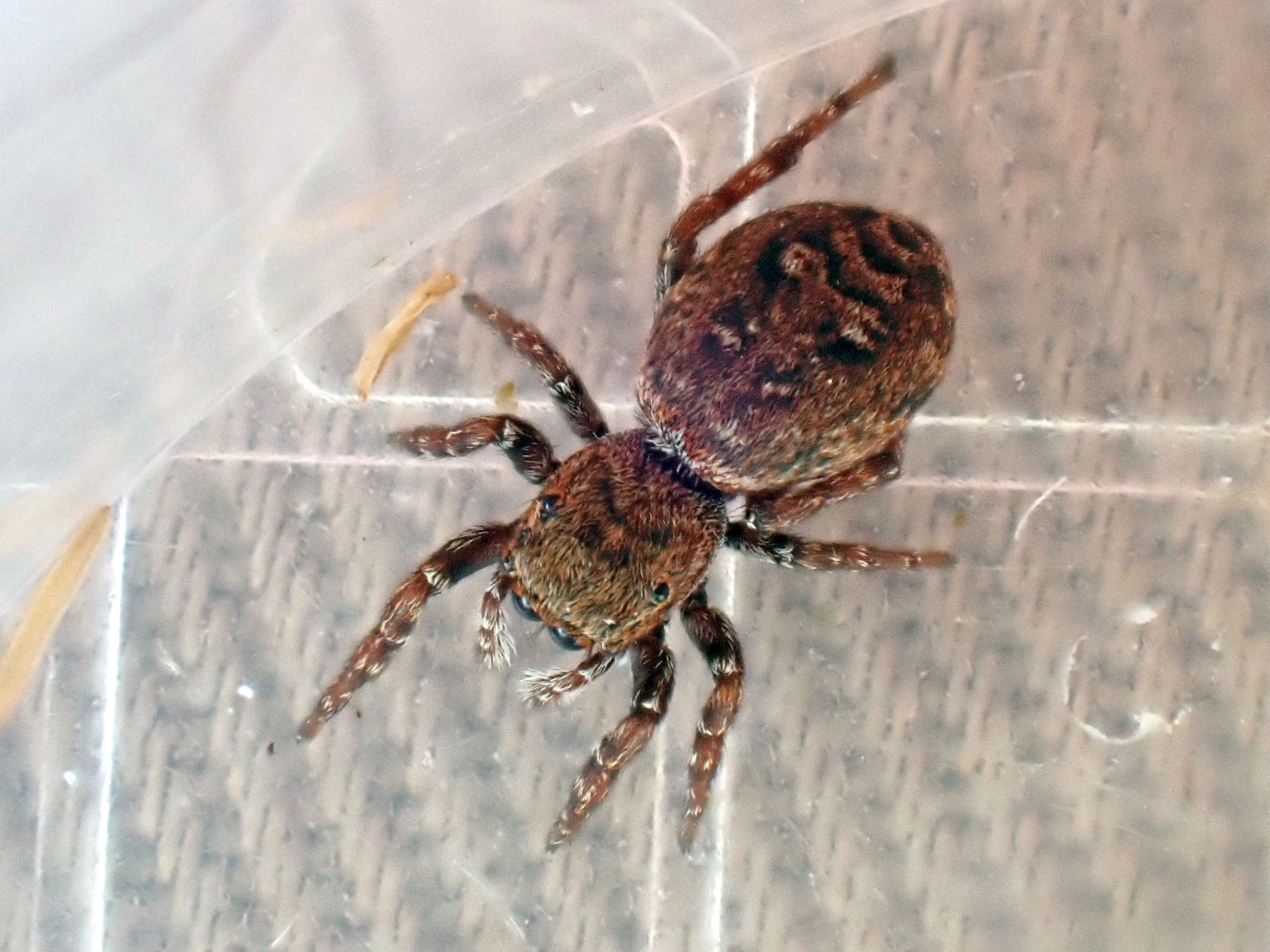
- female

Scientific classification
- Kingdom: Animalia
- Phylum: Arthropoda
- Subphylum: Chelicerata
- Class: Arachnida
- Order: Araneae
- Infraorder: Araneomorphae
- Family: Salticidae
- Genus: Attulus
- Species: A. caricis

Binomial name
- Attulus caricis (Westring, 1861)

Synonyms
- Euophrys atellana C. L. Koch, 1846; Attus caricis Westring, 1861; Dia atellana Simon, 1864; Attus atellanus (Simon, 1864); Sitticus caricis (Westring, 1861); Sittiflor caricis (Westring, 1861); Calositticus caricis (Westring, 1861)

= Attulus caricis =

Species of spider

Attulus caricis is a species of spider in the family Salticidae (jumping spiders). It has a Palearctic distribution.

== Etymology ==
The species name caricis is the genitive form of the Latin word carex, meaning "sedge", referring to the type of habitat where the spider is commonly found.

== Taxonomy ==
The species was first described as Euophrys atellana by Carl Ludwig Koch in 1846, but this name is considered a nomen oblitum (forgotten name). Niklas Westring redescribed it as Attus caricis in 1861, which became the accepted name.

Until 2017, it was placed in the genus Sitticus, then briefly transferred to Sittiflor and Calositticus before being moved to its current genus Attulus by Wayne Maddison and colleagues in 2020 based on phylogenetic studies.

== Description ==
1846 drawing of female by C. L. Koch

Attulus caricis is a small jumping spider with males measuring approximately 2–3 mm in body length and females 3–4 mm. The cephalothorax is about 2 mm long with a blackish opisthosoma.

In males, the cephalothorax has a brownish-rusty to ferruginous pubescence, especially prominent on the sides, with sparse greyish-white hairs. The opisthosoma bears a median longitudinal series of small transverse angles formed by denser brownish-rusty pubescence. The thoracic region between the posterior eyes shows greyish-white punctuation. The clypeus is uniformly colored. The eye region appears somewhat tawny-colored. The chelicerae are small, transversely rugose, impressed above the tip. The pedipalps are blackish, with the patella and tibia having ordinary scales above that are reddish-testaceous. The front legs are slender, with the tibia evidently three times longer than wide, along with the patella evidently much longer than the front femur. The patella is of the same length as the space occupied by the two median anterior eyes.

Females have a clypeus with tawny and greyish-white pubescence, densely clothed. The chelicerae are somewhat rugose, equally convex. The pedipalps are brownish-testaceous, obsoletely ringed with rusty coloration. The palps are of the same color, neither distinctly testaceous nor abundantly covered with long whitish hairs. The abdominal pattern is similar to males but somewhat obsolete.

Both sexes have the basic body color of dull brown or dark grey, with markings that vary between individuals. Some specimens show orange and white hairs mixed with the darker coloration.

== Distribution ==
Attulus caricis has a wide Palearctic distribution, being found across Europe, Turkey, the Caucasus, Russia (from European regions to the Far East), Kazakhstan, and Mongolia. In Great Britain, it is recorded from various locations and is included in the national fauna.

== Habitat ==
As suggested by its name, Attulus caricis is typically found in marshy areas and wetlands where sedges (Carex species) grow. It inhabits low vegetation in these damp environments.
