= Asagena pulcher =

Scientific classification
- Domain: Eukaryota
- Kingdom: Animalia
- Phylum: Arthropoda
- Subphylum: Chelicerata
- Class: Arachnida
- Order: Araneae
- Infraorder: Araneomorphae
- Family: Theridiidae
- Genus: Asagena
- Species: A. pulcher

Binomial name
- Asagena pulcher (Keyserling, 1884)

Species of spider

Asagena pulcher is a species of cobweb spider in the family Theridiidae. It is found in the United States.
