= Attulus eskovi =

Scientific classification
- Kingdom: Animalia
- Phylum: Arthropoda
- Subphylum: Chelicerata
- Class: Arachnida
- Order: Araneae
- Infraorder: Araneomorphae
- Family: Salticidae
- Genus: Attulus
- Species: A. eskovi

Binomial name
- Attulus eskovi Logunov & Wesołowska, 1995

Synonyms
- Sitticus eskovi (Logunov & Wesołowska, 1995)

Species of spider

Attulus eskovi is a jumping spider species in the family Salticidae that was first described in 1995.

== Etymology ==
The species is named after Kirill Eskov, who collected most of the type material and information on its habitat.

== Distribution ==
The holotype was found in the Kurile Islands and the species is known from Primorsky Krai in the Russian Far East and Sakhalin. Logunov & Wesołowska speculate that it is probable that it also occurs in Japan and Korea.
