= Asagena brignolii =

Scientific classification
- Domain: Eukaryota
- Kingdom: Animalia
- Phylum: Arthropoda
- Subphylum: Chelicerata
- Class: Arachnida
- Order: Araneae
- Infraorder: Araneomorphae
- Family: Theridiidae
- Genus: Asagena
- Species: A. brignolii

Binomial name
- Asagena brignolii (Knoflach, 1996)

Species of spider

Asagena brignolii is a species of cobweb spider in the family Theridiidae. It is found in Greece.
