= Asagena meridionalis =

Scientific classification
- Domain: Eukaryota
- Kingdom: Animalia
- Phylum: Arthropoda
- Subphylum: Chelicerata
- Class: Arachnida
- Order: Araneae
- Infraorder: Araneomorphae
- Family: Theridiidae
- Genus: Asagena
- Species: A. meridionalis

Binomial name
- Asagena meridionalis Kulczyński, 1894

Species of spider

Asagena meridionalis is a species of cobweb spider in the family Theridiidae. It is found throughout central, south, and east Europe, as well as the Caucasus.
