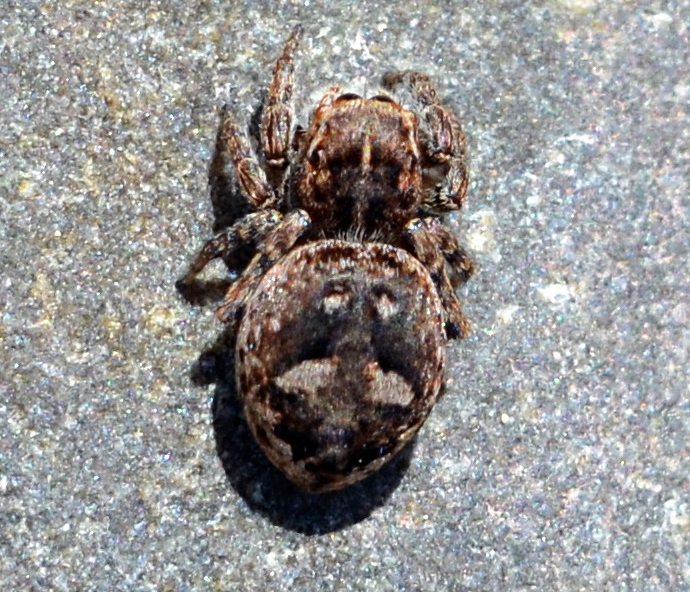
- female from Canada
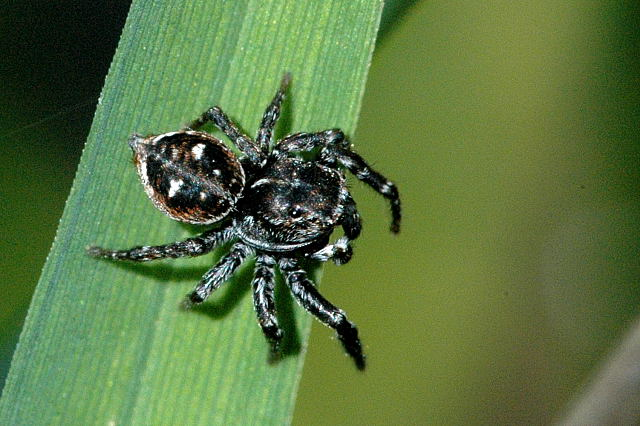
- male from Belgium

Conservation status
- Secure (NatureServe)

Scientific classification
- Kingdom: Animalia
- Phylum: Arthropoda
- Subphylum: Chelicerata
- Class: Arachnida
- Order: Araneae
- Infraorder: Araneomorphae
- Family: Salticidae
- Genus: Attulus
- Species: A. floricola

Binomial name
- Attulus floricola (C.L. Koch, 1837)

Synonyms
- Euophrys floricola C. L. Koch, 1837; Attus palustris Peckham & Peckham, 1883; Attus morosus Banks, 1895; Sitticus floricola orientalis Strand, in Bösenberg & Strand, 1906; Attus sex-signatus Franganillo, 1910; Sitticus sexsignatus Roewer, 1955; Sittiflor floricola Prószyński, 2017

= Attulus floricola =

Flower jumping spider

Species of spider

Attulus floricola is a species of jumping spider in the family Salticidae. It has a widespread Holarctic distribution, occurring across Europe, the Caucasus, Russia (from Europe to the Far East), Kazakhstan, Central Asia, China, Japan, Canada, and the United States.

== Etymology ==
The species name floricola derives from Latin flos, floris meaning "flower" and colere meaning "to inhabit", referring to the spider's habit of living on flower heads and similar vegetation.

== Distribution ==
A. floricola is found across the Holarctic region. In Europe, it occurs from the British Isles and Scandinavia south to the Mediterranean. Its range extends eastward through Russia to the Far East, and includes Kazakhstan and Central Asia. In Asia, it is found in China and Japan. In North America, it occurs in Canada and the United States.

== Description ==
female (1846 drawing)

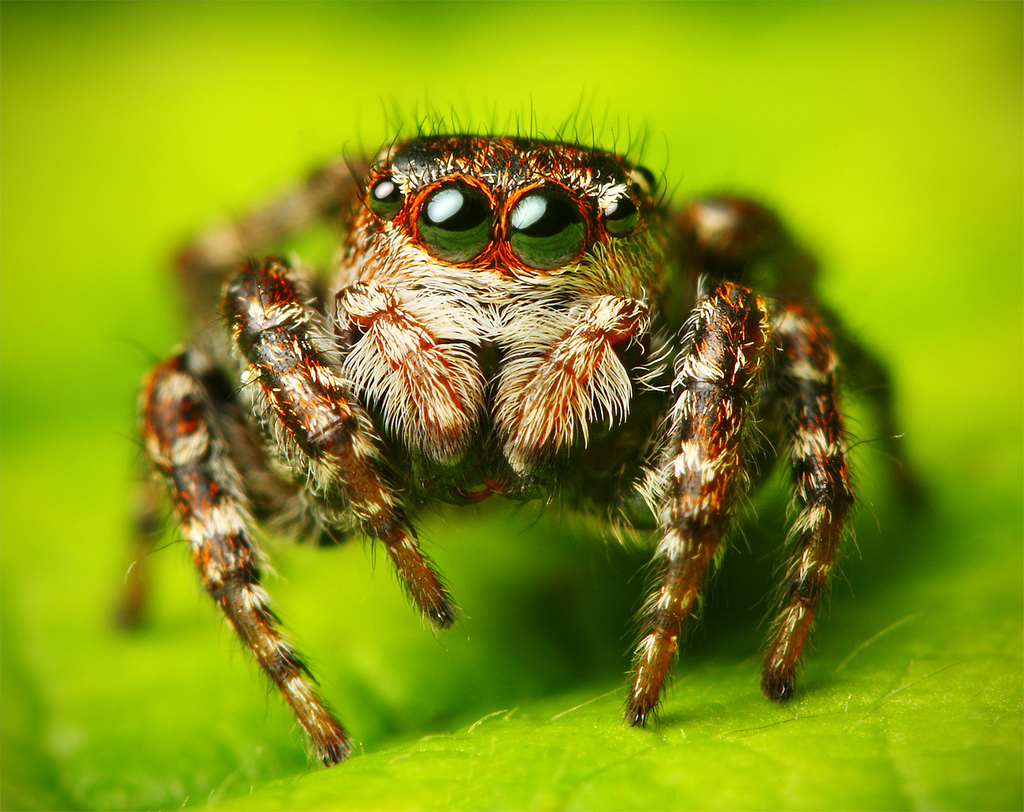
front view

=== Females ===
Females have a body length of 5.80 mm and cephalothorax length of 2.71 mm, width 2.10 mm. The cephalothorax is black or more or less covered with brown, slightly reddish and white hairs, with the middle area being white. The area around the eyes is pale yellowish-brown. The chelicerae are black with 4 anterior teeth and no posterior teeth. The opisthosoma is black covered with white long hairs. The legs are brown with black annulations. The dorsal surface of the abdomen is covered with grayish-black fine hairs, with 4 relatively large white spots along the sides of the abdomen. The ventral surface of the abdomen is pale grayish-brown. The external female genitalia are distinctly wider than long with a median septum. The copulatory ducts are long and curved. The spermathecae are egg-shaped and the accessory spermathecae are small.

=== Males ===
Males have a body length of 4.5 mm. The cephalothorax is elliptical, longer than wide, blackish-brown and densely covered with golden-brown fine hairs. The carapace is raised. The head region is deep blackish-brown with metallic luster, interspersed with sparse long black hairs among the golden-brown fine hairs. White hairs form transverse stripes at the front edge and front-rear edge of the anterior eye row, and there are 3 longitudinal white stripes near the sides and rear edge of the posterior eye row and in the middle fossa area. The chelicerae, jaw, and lower lip are reddish-brown to blackish-brown with darker basal coloration. The jaw is longer than wide with a yellow tip, inclined toward the center, with a smaller lower lip forming a triangular shape. The opisthosoma is blackish-brown, egg-shaped, with a pointed rear end and central ridge, covered with pale fine long hairs and dense marginal hairs. The legs are reddish-brown, covered with golden-brown fine hairs interspersed with sparse black long hairs and white short hairs.

== Taxonomy ==
Attulus floricola was originally described as Euophrys floricola by C. L. Koch in 1837. The species has undergone significant taxonomic revision, having been placed in several different genera throughout its taxonomic history. It was long placed in the genus Sitticus, then briefly transferred to Calositticus and later to Sittiflor by Prószyński in 2017, before finally being transferred to Attulus by Maddison et al. in 2020.

A major taxonomic issue has been the relationship between Eurasian and North American populations. North American populations were long recognized as a separate species, Attus palustris Peckham & Peckham, 1883, and later treated as a subspecies Sitticus floricola palustris. However, Prószyński (1980) suggested these were conspecific with Eurasian populations, and Maddison et al. (2020) confirmed this synonymy based on both morphological and molecular evidence.

The species Attulus morosus (Banks, 1895) from North America has also been synonymized with A. floricola.

== Habitat and ecology ==
The species lives in bogs, marshes, fen and meadows, on the heads of plants like Eriophorum vaginatum (cotton grass) or similar, on which the spiders occasionally spin their cocoons. In Britain, they can be found from March to September.

== External sources ==
- Roberts, Michael J. (1 January 1985). The Spiders of Great Britain and Ireland: Atypidae to Theridiosomatidae. Harley Books. p. 126. ISBN 978-0-946589-05-0.
