= Asagena americana =

Scientific classification
- Domain: Eukaryota
- Kingdom: Animalia
- Phylum: Arthropoda
- Subphylum: Chelicerata
- Class: Arachnida
- Order: Araneae
- Infraorder: Araneomorphae
- Family: Theridiidae
- Genus: Asagena
- Species: A. americana

Binomial name
- Asagena americana Emerton, 1882

Species of spider

Asagena americana, the twospotted cobweb spider, is a species of cobweb spider in the family Theridiidae. It is found in the United States, Canada, and China.
