= Attulus terebratus =

- female
- male

Scientific classification
- Kingdom: Animalia
- Phylum: Arthropoda
- Subphylum: Chelicerata
- Class: Arachnida
- Order: Araneae
- Infraorder: Araneomorphae
- Family: Salticidae
- Genus: Attulus
- Species: A. terebratus

Binomial name
- Attulus terebratus (Clerck, 1758)

Synonyms
- Sitticus terebratus (Clerck, 1758)

Species of spider

Attulus terebratus is a species of spiders from the family Salticidae, found in all European countries except for Belgium, Denmark, Spain, Portugal, the Netherlands, and the former Yugoslavian states. It is also commonly found in Kazakhstan, Mongolia, and Turkey.

== Description ==
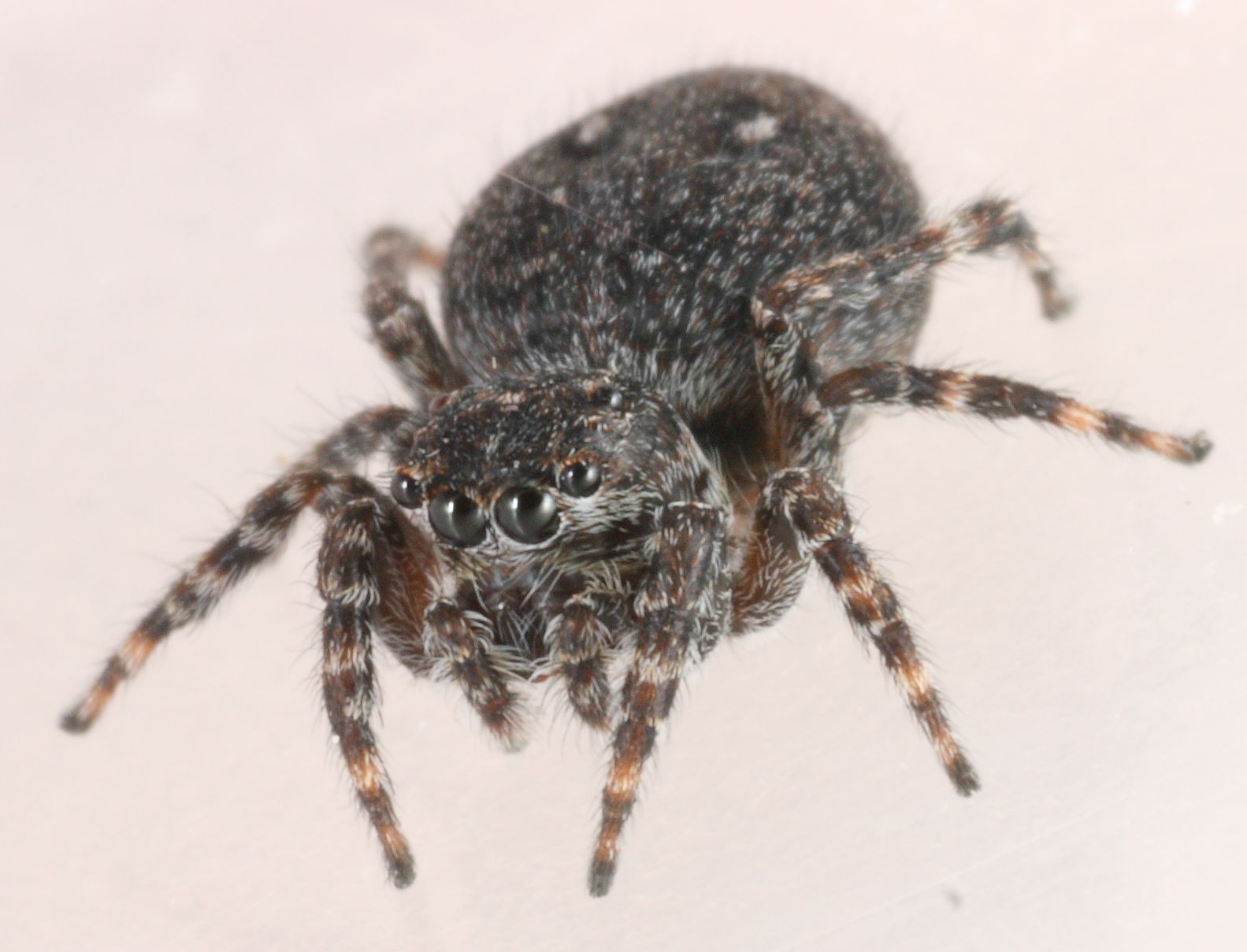
female from Sweden

This species has eight legs, and eight eyes. It has a black coloured body, with brownish legs.
