= Chinophrys =

Scientific classification
- Kingdom: Animalia
- Phylum: Arthropoda
- Subphylum: Chelicerata
- Class: Arachnida
- Order: Araneae
- Infraorder: Araneomorphae
- Family: Salticidae
- Subfamily: Salticinae
- Genus: Chinophrys; Zhang & Maddison, 2012

Type species
- C. pengi Zhang & Maddison, 2012

Species
- 8, see text

Genus of spiders

Chinophrys is a genus of jumping spiders that was erected by J. X. Zhang & Wayne Paul Maddison in 2012.

== Distribution ==
Two of the described species are endemic to Taiwan, with four others are found in mainland China. One species is endemic to South Africa. In 2021, a new species was described from Vietnam.

== Description ==
Chinophrys are medium-sized spiders with a dark carapace. The abdomen shows a mosaic of dark and yellowish spots. Anterior part of abdomen in males covered by a sclerotized scutum. Chelicerae with multiple teeth on promargin and fissident retromargin. Male palp with coiled embolus, bulb with proximal lobe. Epigyne with a median septum.

== Species ==
As of October 2025, this genus includes eight species:

- Chinophrys liujiapingensis (Yang & Tang, 1997) – China
- Chinophrys mengyangensis Cao & Li, 2016 – China
- Chinophrys pengi Zhang & Maddison, 2012 – China (type species)
- Chinophrys pulcra Logunov, 2021 – Vietnam
- Chinophrys shennongjia Yu & Zhang, 2022 – China
- Chinophrys taiwanensis (Peng & Li, 2002) – Taiwan
- Chinophrys trifasciata Wesołowska, Azarkina & Russell-Smith, 2014 – South Africa
- Chinophrys wuae (Peng, Tso & Li, 2002) – Taiwan
