= Asagena semideserta =

Scientific classification
- Domain: Eukaryota
- Kingdom: Animalia
- Phylum: Arthropoda
- Subphylum: Chelicerata
- Class: Arachnida
- Order: Araneae
- Infraorder: Araneomorphae
- Family: Theridiidae
- Genus: Asagena
- Species: A. semideserta

Binomial name
- Asagena semideserta (Ponomarev, 2005)

Species of spider

Asagena semideserta is a species of cobweb spider in the family Theridiidae. It is found in Kazakhstan and Mongolia.
