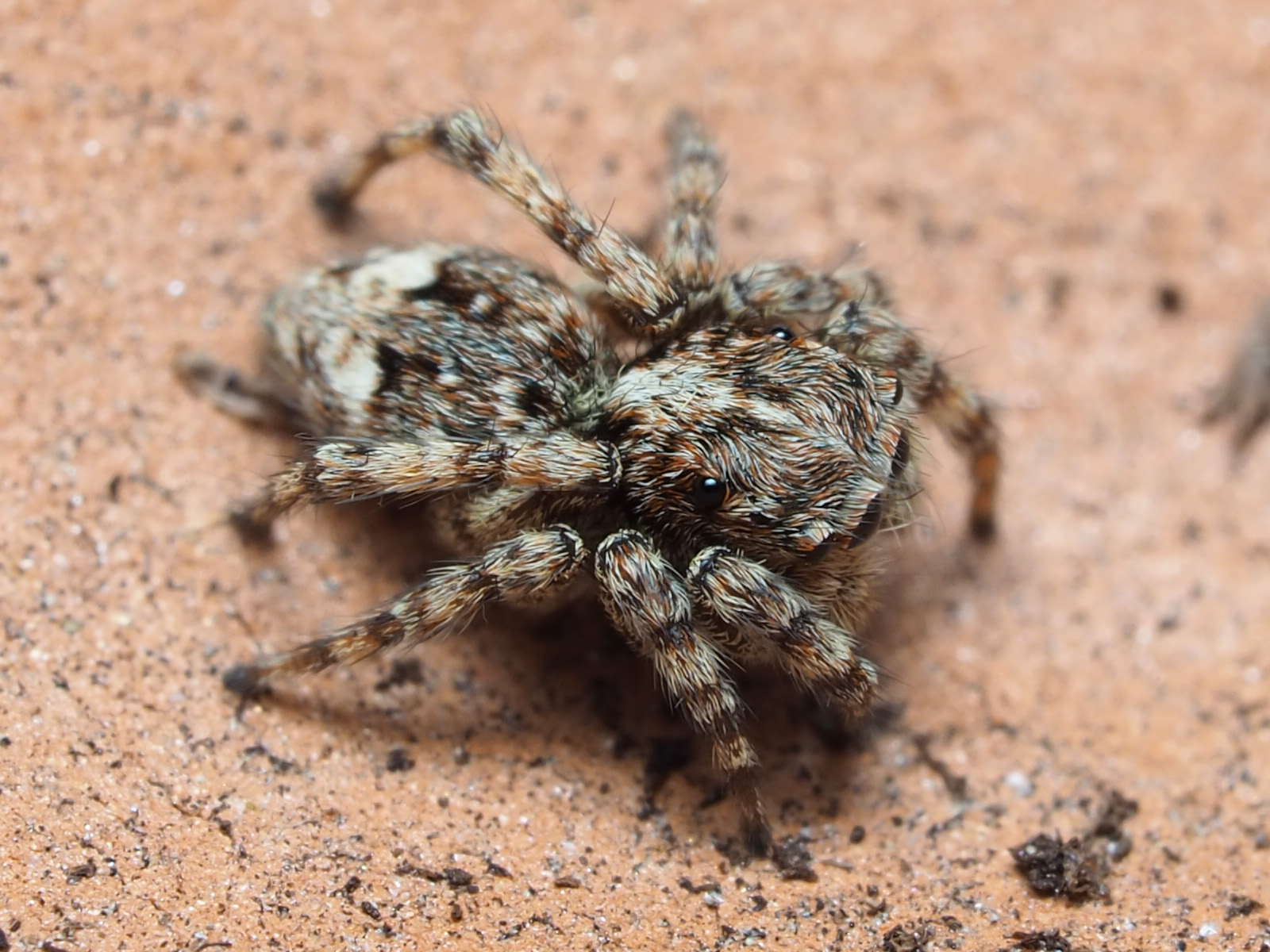
- Female
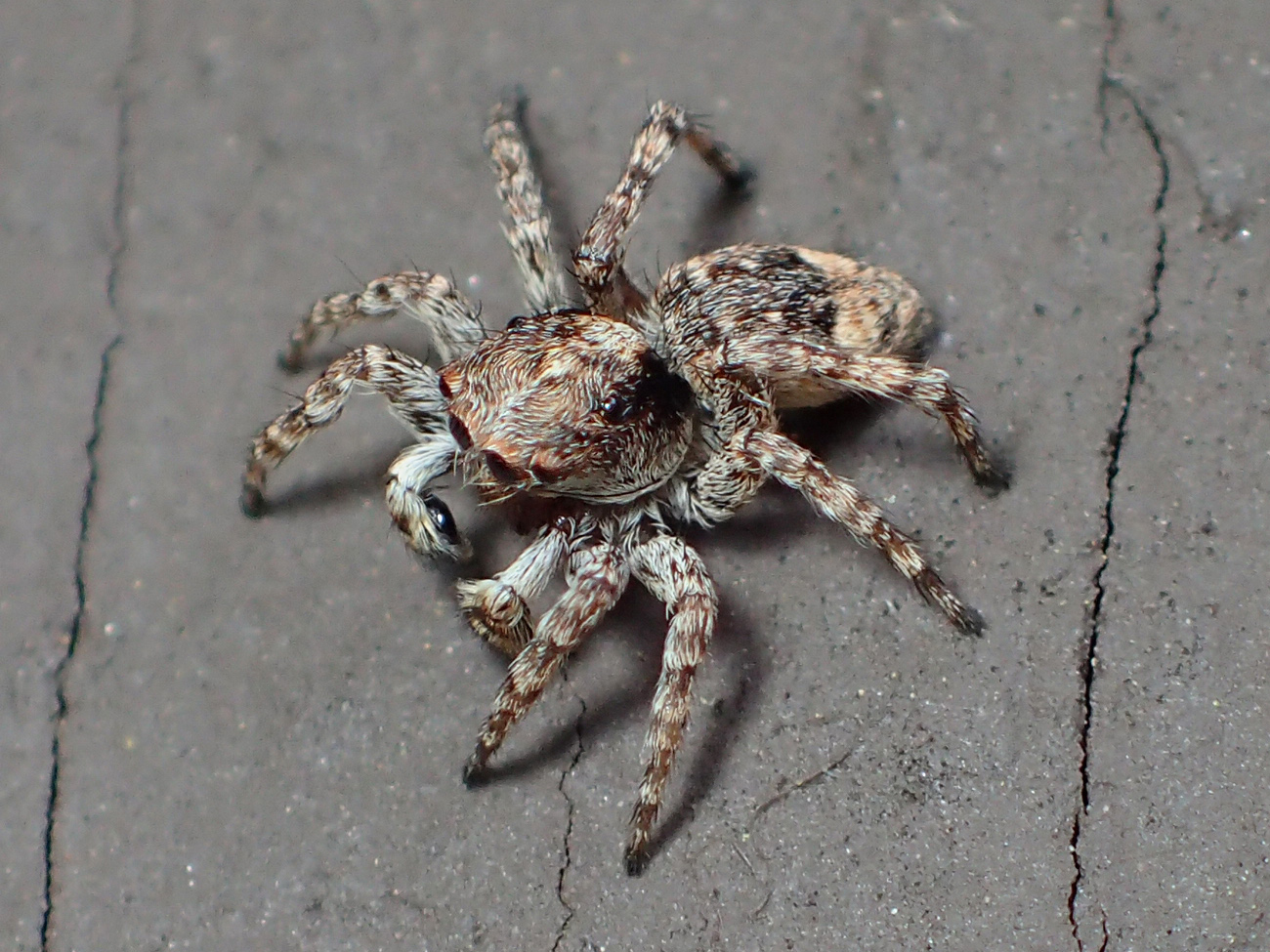
- Male

Scientific classification
- Kingdom: Animalia
- Phylum: Arthropoda
- Subphylum: Chelicerata
- Class: Arachnida
- Order: Araneae
- Infraorder: Araneomorphae
- Family: Salticidae
- Genus: Attulus
- Species: A. fasciger

Binomial name
- Attulus fasciger W. Maddison, in Maddison et al., 2020 (Simon, 1880)

Synonyms
- Sitticus fasciger (Simon, 1880)

= Attulus fasciger =

Species of spider

Attulus fasciger, or the Asiatic wall jumping spider, is a species of spider from the family Salticidae native to northern and western Asia. However, it has also been introduced to North America.

== Description ==
The spider is brownish-black coloured, has 8 eyes, and is 3–4 millimetres (0.12–0.16 in) in size. The sexes are similar in size but the males have a small, but more slender abdomen compared to the female, with larger black palps.

== Species history ==
The species, originally found throughout north and west Asia, is an introduced species in North America and was first documented there in the 1950s or 1960s. Their success can be attributed to colonizing man-made structures, which provide refuge and camouflage for the mottled brown-and-grey spiders. This species also capitalizes on the artificial lighting found on many buildings, which attracts prey at night, thereby providing these visually-acute spiders with extended foraging opportunities.
