= Attulus penicilloides =

Scientific classification
- Domain: Eukaryota
- Kingdom: Animalia
- Phylum: Arthropoda
- Subphylum: Chelicerata
- Class: Arachnida
- Order: Araneae
- Infraorder: Araneomorphae
- Family: Salticidae
- Subfamily: Salticinae
- Genus: Attulus
- Species: A. penicilloides

Binomial name
- Attulus penicilloides (Wesołowska, 1981)

Species of spider

Attulus penicilloides is a jumping spider species that lives in North Korea. The female was first described by Wanda Wesołowska in 1993, and named Sitticus penicilloides in the genus Sitticus but was moved to the genus Attulus in 2017.
