= Attulus finschi =

Conservation status
- Secure (NatureServe)

Scientific classification
- Kingdom: Animalia
- Phylum: Arthropoda
- Subphylum: Chelicerata
- Class: Arachnida
- Order: Araneae
- Infraorder: Araneomorphae
- Family: Salticidae
- Genus: Attulus
- Species: A. finschi

Binomial name
- Attulus finschi (L. Koch, 1879)

Synonyms
- Sitticus finschi (L. Koch, 1879)

Species of spider

Attulus finschi is a species of spider from the jumping spider family Salticidae. It is found in Russia, Canada, and the United States.
