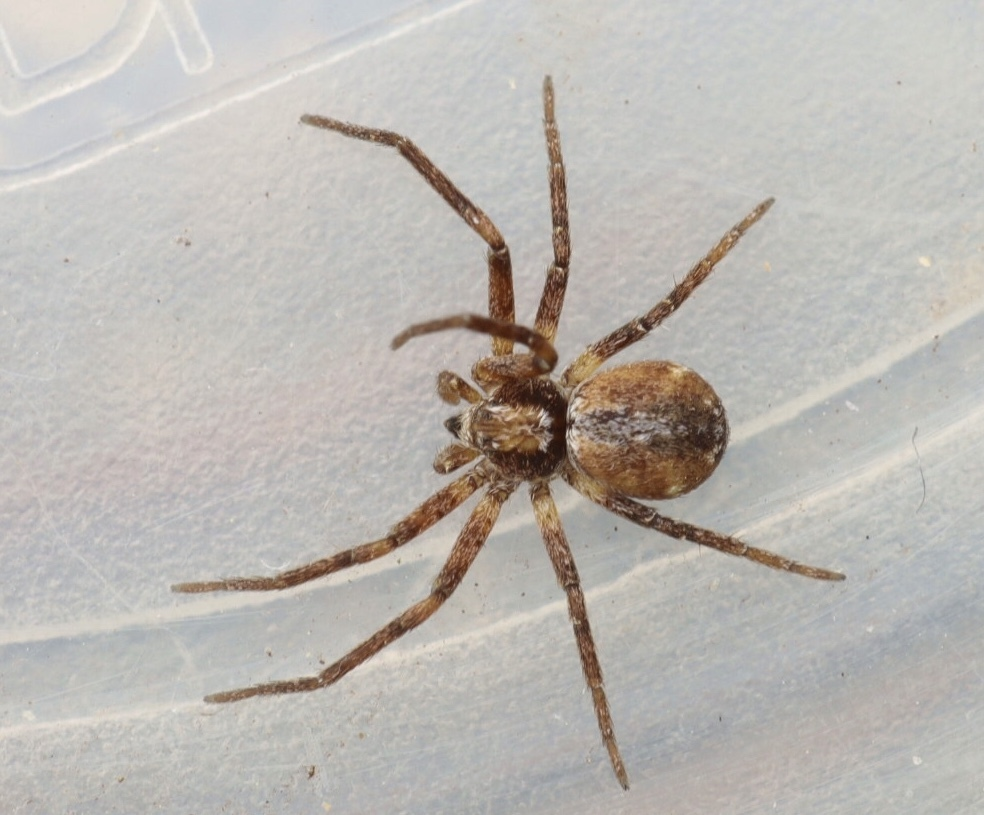

Scientific classification
- Kingdom: Animalia
- Phylum: Arthropoda
- Subphylum: Chelicerata
- Class: Arachnida
- Order: Araneae
- Infraorder: Araneomorphae
- Family: Philodromidae
- Genus: Philodromus
- Species: P. collinus

Binomial name
- Philodromus collinus C. L. Koch, 1835

= Philodromus collinus =

Species of spider

Philodromus collinus is a species of spider found in Europe, Turkey, and the Caucasus.
