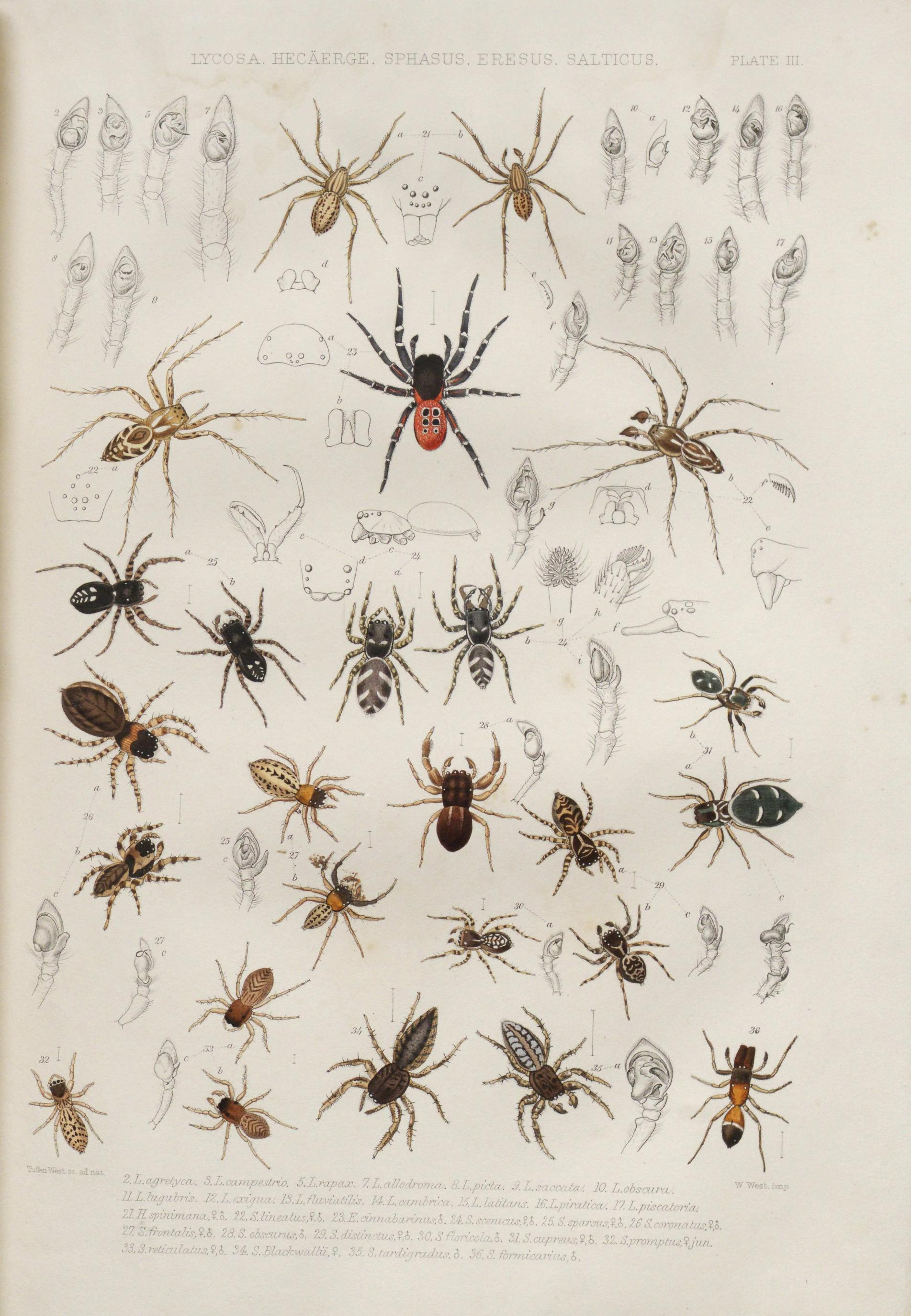
- Attulus saltator fig 30

Scientific classification
- Domain: Eukaryota
- Kingdom: Animalia
- Phylum: Arthropoda
- Subphylum: Chelicerata
- Class: Arachnida
- Order: Araneae
- Infraorder: Araneomorphae
- Family: Salticidae
- Subfamily: Salticinae
- Genus: Attulus
- Species: A. saltator

Binomial name
- Attulus saltator (O.P.-Cambridge, 1868)

Synonyms
- Attus saltator O. Pickard-Cambridge, 1868; Salticus saltator (O. Pickard-Cambridge, 1868); Sitticulus saltator (O. Pickard-Cambridge, 1868); Sitticus saltator (O. Pickard-Cambridge, 1868); Yllenus saltator (O. Pickard-Cambridge, 1868)

= Attulus saltator =

Species of spider

Attulus saltator (formerly Sitticus saltator) is a species of jumping spider, from the Sitticinae subfamily. It was first described by Frederick Octavius Pickard-Cambridge in 1868 and has a Palearctic distribution, including Great Britain.

== Description ==
Females have a body length of up to about 4 mm (3/16 in), males being slightly smaller at around 3 mm (1/8 in). The carapace is black with a lighter marking in the midline, the abdomen brownish with lighter markings. The fourth pair of legs are longer than in species of the closely related genus Sitticus. Identification is based on the precise structure of the female epigyne and the male palpal bulb.

== Taxonomy ==
The species was first described, as Attus saltator, by Octavius Pickard-Cambridge in 1868. In 1871, he moved it to the genus Salticus. It has also been placed in the genus Sitticus, the placement used by most (but not all) arachnologists until 2017, when Jerzy Prószyński split the genus Sitticus, creating five new genera, as well as transferring some species, including S. saltator, to the genus Attulus.

== Distribution and habitat ==
Attulus saltator is found from western Europe through to south-western Siberia. In England and Wales, it is mainly found in sandy places such as sand dunes. Elsewhere in northern Europe, it is widespread, but uncommon.
