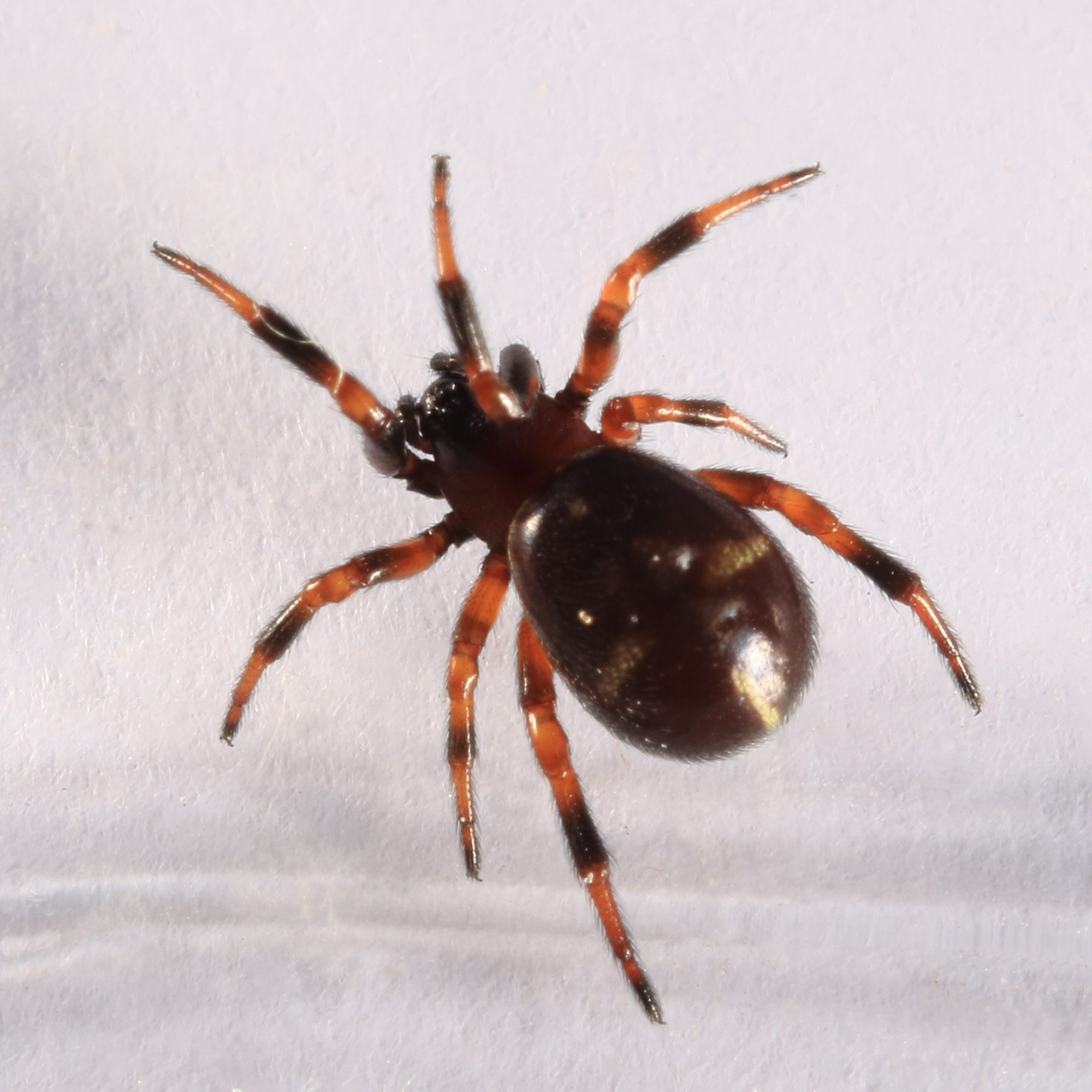

Scientific classification
- Domain: Eukaryota
- Kingdom: Animalia
- Phylum: Arthropoda
- Subphylum: Chelicerata
- Class: Arachnida
- Order: Araneae
- Infraorder: Araneomorphae
- Family: Theridiidae
- Genus: Asagena
- Species: A. phalerata

Binomial name
- Asagena phalerata (Panzer, 1801)

= Asagena phalerata =

Species of spider

Asagena phalerata is a species of cobweb spider in the family Theridiidae. It is found throughout Europe and Eurasia, as far east as Korea. They are typically found in sparsely vegetated environments.
