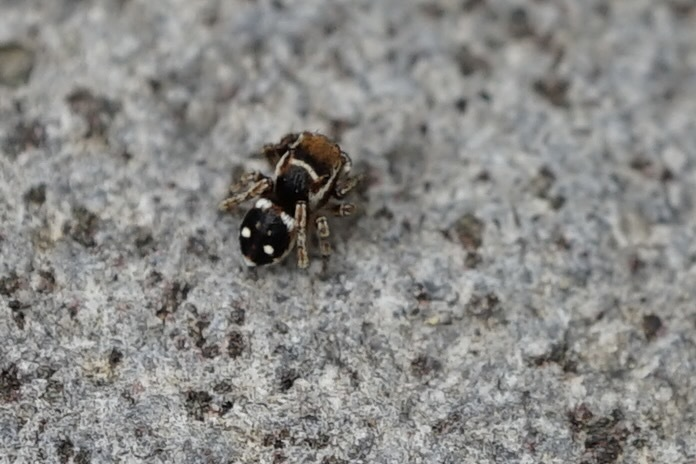
- male from Japan

Scientific classification
- Kingdom: Animalia
- Phylum: Arthropoda
- Subphylum: Chelicerata
- Class: Arachnida
- Order: Araneae
- Infraorder: Araneomorphae
- Family: Salticidae
- Genus: Attulus
- Species: A. penicillatus

Binomial name
- Attulus penicillatus (Simon, 1875)

Synonyms
- Attus penicillatus Simon, 1875; Attus illibatus Simon, 1868; Attus inaequalipes Simon, 1868; Attus guttatus Thorell, 1875; Sitticus patellidens Bösenberg & Strand, 1906; Sitticus penicillatus (Simon, 1875)

= Attulus penicillatus =

Species of spider

Attulus penicillatus is a species of jumping spider in the genus Attulus. The species has a widespread Palearctic distribution across Europe, the Caucasus, Russia (from Europe to the Far East), Kazakhstan, China, Korea, and Japan.

== Etymology ==
The species name penicillatus is derived from Latin penicillus, meaning "little brush" or "painter's brush", likely referring to the brush-like appearance of certain setae or markings on the spider.

== Taxonomy ==
The species was originally described by Eugène Simon in 1875 as Attus penicillatus. It has undergone several taxonomic changes and was placed in the genus Sitticus for many years before being transferred to Attulus in 2017.

The species belongs to the penicillatus species group within Attulus, which was revised by Logunov in 1993.

== Distribution ==
A. penicillatus has an extensive distribution across the Palearctic region. It occurs throughout Europe. The species extends eastward through the Caucasus and Russia to the Far East, and south through Central Asia to China, Korea, and Japan.

== Habitat ==
Attulus penicillatus inhabits various terrestrial environments. In Europe, it has been recorded in steppe localities on calcareous bedrock, where it exhibits interesting overwintering behavior. The species has been observed overwintering in empty land-snail shells, particularly those of Caucasotachea vindobonensis and Xerolenta obvia.

== Description ==
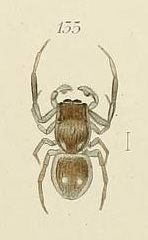
Drawing of male from Bösenberg & Strand (1906)

Males of A. penicillatus have a cephalothorax length of 1.50–1.75 mm and an opisthosoma length of 1.40–1.45 mm. The anterior eye row width measures 1.00–1.09 mm, while the posterior eye row width is 0.97–1.04 mm. The eye region length ranges from 0.57–0.70 mm. The cephalothorax is dark brown in color, and the opisthosoma bears two distinctive circular white spots. The legs show specific coloration patterns: the coxa, trochanter, leg I and III patellae and posterior patellae, and legs II and IV have bristles. The cephalothorax has white hairs on the sides, and the eye region has brown bristles with brown and green metallic luster, with brown bristles at the front end.

The male pedipalps show characteristic features with the tibia and posterior tibia being yellow, and the posterior tibia bearing two pairs of bristles. The tibia has 5 small bristles, while the tarsus has 3 small bristles. Other legs are gray-yellow with gray ring patterns near the joints and additional bristles.

Females are larger, with a body length of 3.32 mm. The cephalothorax is brown, covered with gray-brown hairs, and the eye region is dark brown. The anterior and posterior eye rows are equal in width. The chelicerae are light brown with 4 promarginal teeth and no retromarginal teeth. The sternum is gray-brown, and the labium and lower lip are dark brown. The legs are gray-brown, and the opisthosoma dorsum is dark brown without markings. The ventral side of the opisthosoma is gray-brown, and the spinnerets are the same color.

The female epigyne has a central septum that is narrow but prominent, with copulatory openings located on both sides of the central septum.

== Behavior ==
Attulus penicillatus exhibits notable overwintering behavior. Research in the Czech Republic found the species overwintering in empty land-snail shells, sharing this habitat with other jumping spider species such as Pellenes tripunctatus and P. nigrociliatus. However, insufficient numbers of A. penicillatus were found to determine specific habitat preferences compared to the other species studied.
