= Attulus talgarensis =

Scientific classification
- Kingdom: Animalia
- Phylum: Arthropoda
- Subphylum: Chelicerata
- Class: Arachnida
- Order: Araneae
- Infraorder: Araneomorphae
- Family: Salticidae
- Genus: Attulus
- Species: A. talgarensis

Binomial name
- Attulus talgarensis (Logunov & Wesołowska, 1993)

Species of spider

Attulus talgarensis is a jumping spider species that lives in Kazakhstan and Kyrgyzstan. It was first described in 1993 and named Sitticus talgarensis but was moved to the genus Attulus in 2017.
