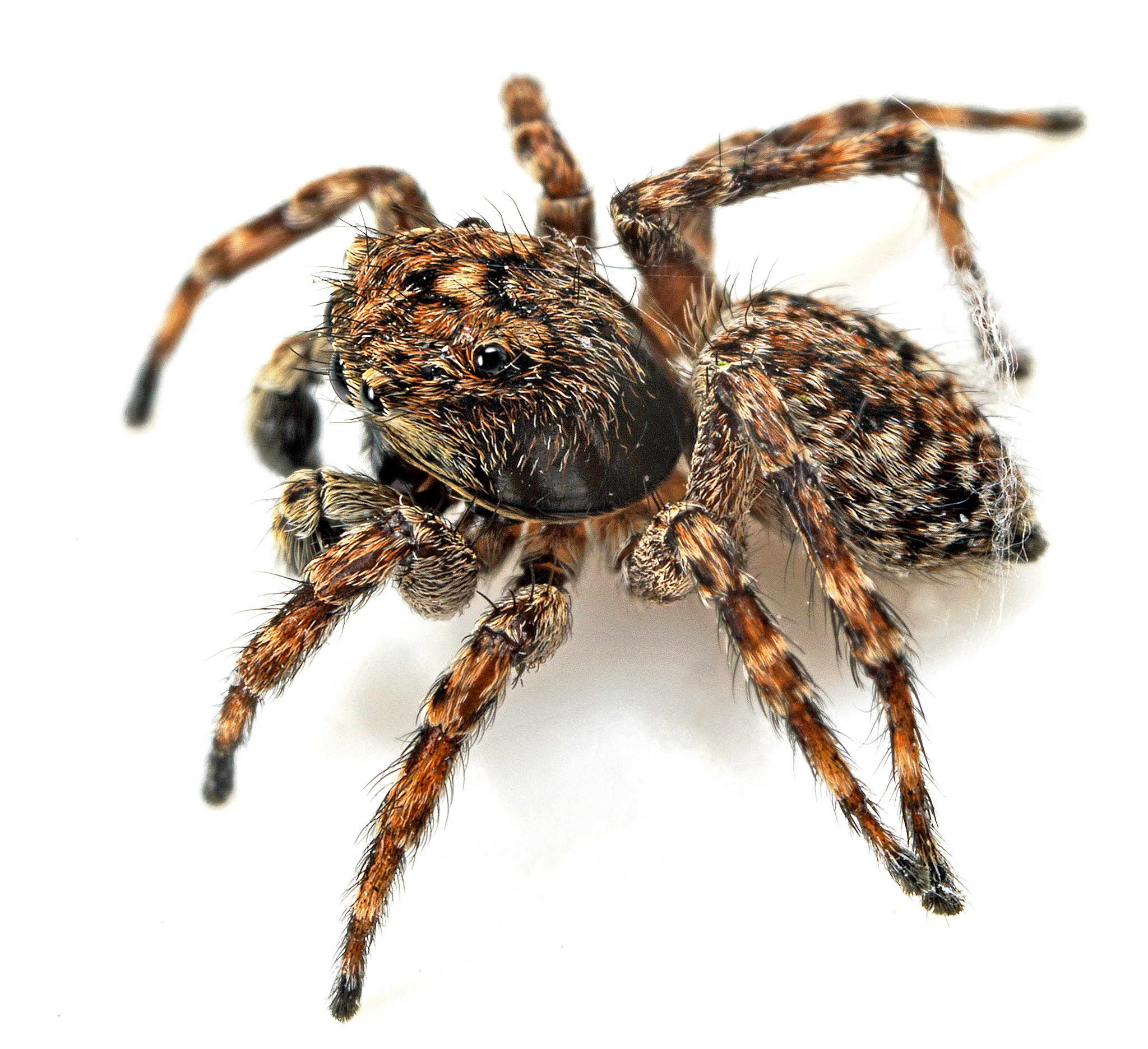
- male

Scientific classification
- Kingdom: Animalia
- Phylum: Arthropoda
- Subphylum: Chelicerata
- Class: Arachnida
- Order: Araneae
- Infraorder: Araneomorphae
- Family: Salticidae
- Genus: Attulus
- Species: A. pubescens

Binomial name
- Attulus pubescens (Fabricius, 1775)

Synonyms
- Sitticus pubescens Dahl, 1926; Sittipub pubescens Prószyński, 2017a; Hypositticus pubescens (Fabricius, 1775)

= Attulus pubescens =

Species of spider

Attulus pubescens is a species of jumping spiders (family Salticidae). Until 2017, it was known as Sitticus pubescens.

== Description ==
female

female

male

female

female

female

Females have a body length of up to about 5 mm (3/16 in), males being slightly shorter at around 4 mm (5/32 in), with a smaller abdomen. Both are darkish in colour with variable white markings. Identification is based on the precise structure of the female epigyne and the male palpal bulb.

== Distribution and habitat ==
Attulus pubescens is native to Europe (including England and Wales), and from North Africa through to Turkey and Afghanistan. It has been introduced to the United States. The species is often associated with people, being found on walls and fences and sometimes inside houses. Away from dwellings, it is also found under stones and on tree trunks.
