= Todzha Lake =

Lake in Russia

- Azas Lake
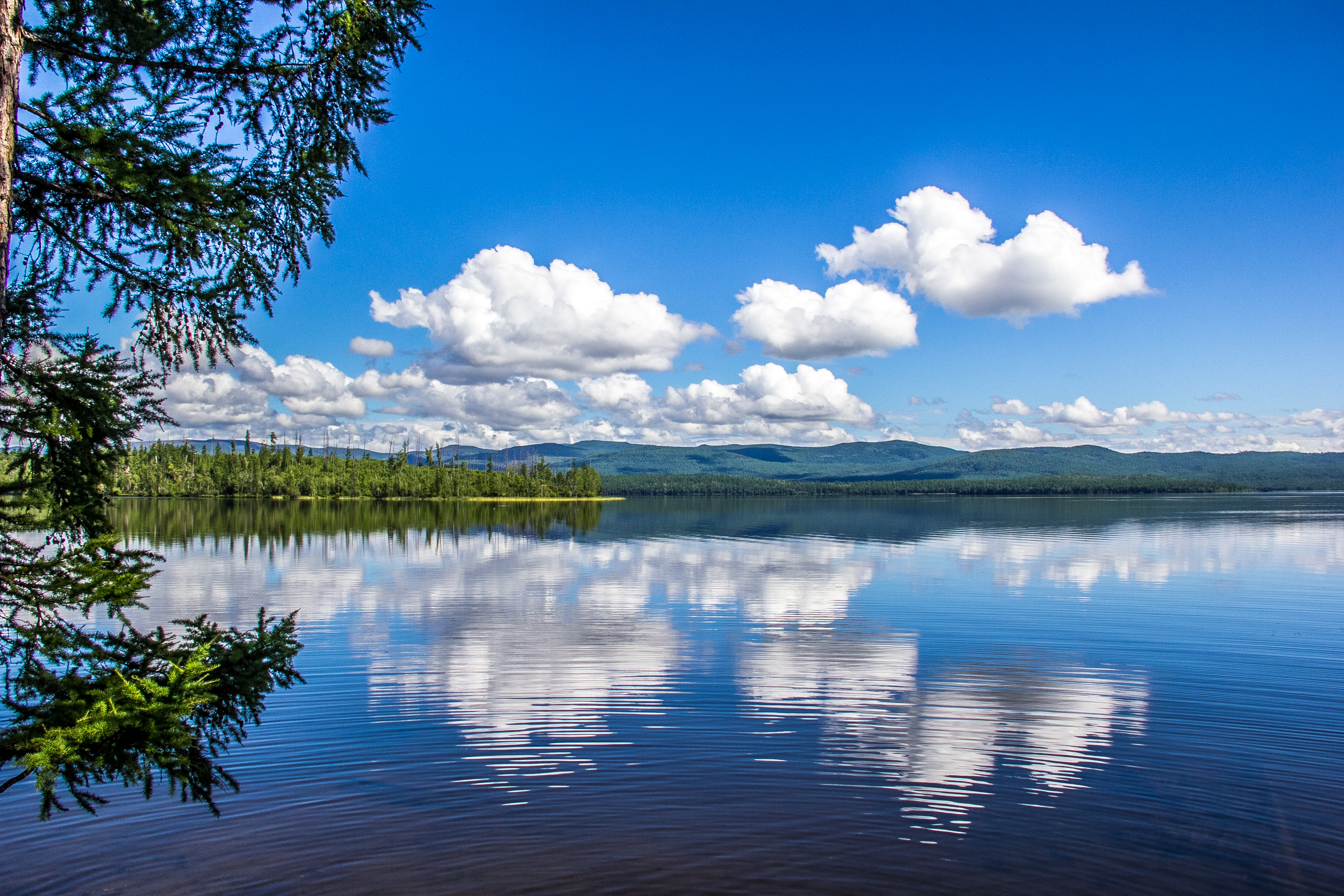

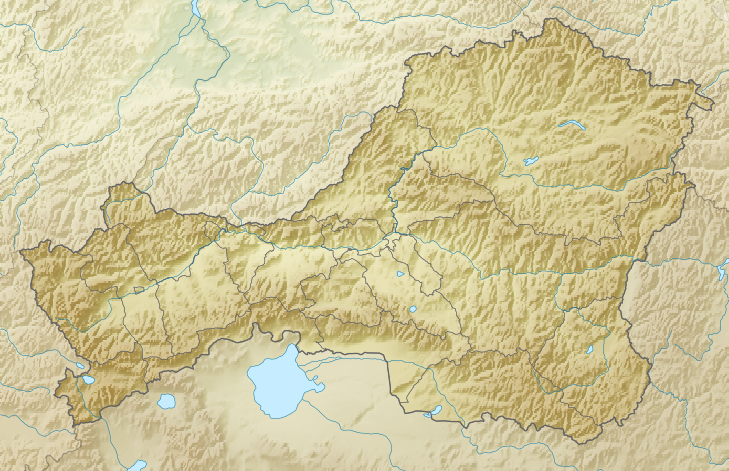
- Location within Tuva Republic
- Location: Tuva
- Coordinates: 52.4°N 96.5°E
- Primary inflows: Azas River
- Primary outflows: Toora-Khem River
- Basin countries: Russia
- Surface area: 51.6 km^{2} (19.9 sq mi)
- Frozen: early November - second half of May

Todzha Lake, also known as Azas Lake (Russian: Тоджа, Азас), is a lake in Tuva in Russia.

The lake has a surface area of 51.6 km^{2} (19.9 sq mi). The Azas River flows into and the Toora-Khem River flows out of Todzha Lake. The lake freezes in early November and remains icebound until the second half of May.
