= Christine Rollard =

French arachnologist (born 1958)

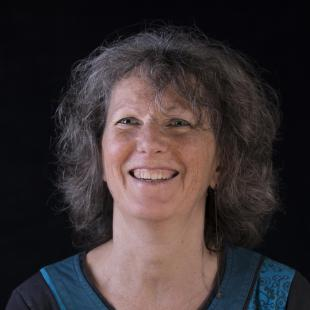
- Born: 25 January 1958 (age 68)
- Education: University of Rennes

Christine Rollard (born 25 January 1958) is a French arachnologist. She is a teacher-researcher at the National Museum of Natural History in Paris. She is the author of around fifty publications on spiders, and gives numerous teachings and participates in numerous initiatives to disseminate knowledge to a wide audience. She is one of the few spider specialists in France.

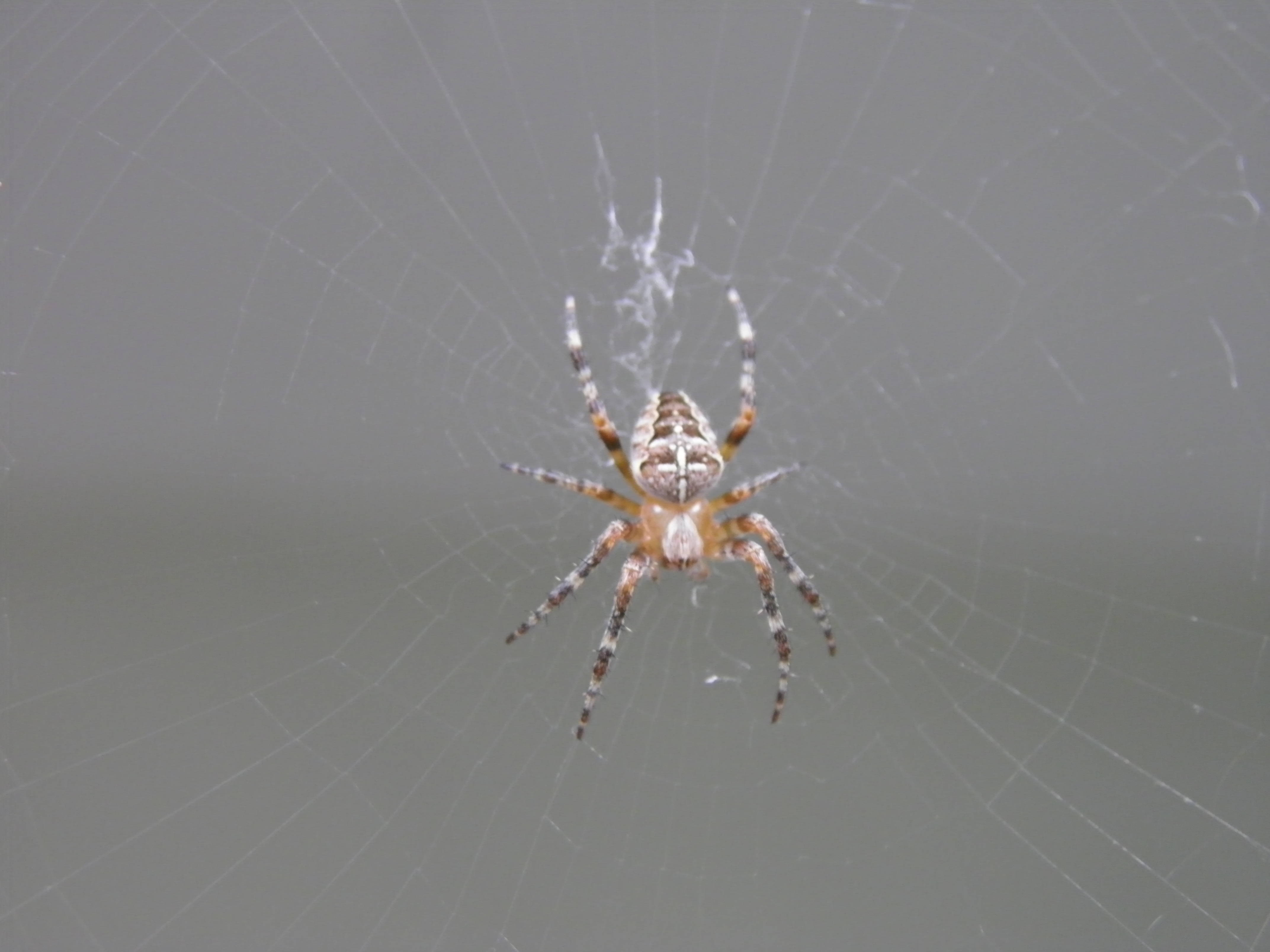
Cross-bearing spider in France

== Biography ==
The daughter of an engineer and a teacher, living in Saint-Nazaire, she dreamed of embracing her mother's profession but failed the competitive exam three times. She enrolled in the Faculty of Sciences in Nantes where she specialized in ecology and biology of organisms, obtaining a master's degree. She holds a DEA in parasitology (1982), under the supervision of Jean-Pierre Nénon and Alain Canard at the University of Rennes 1, then a doctorate with a thesis entitled The biocenosis associated with araneids, in the Armorican moors: study of insect-spider relationships in 1987 under this joint supervision. Although she did not intend to pursue arachnology, it was the discovery of these arthropods during her thesis that led her to study them subsequently.

She has been a teacher-researcher at the National Museum of Natural History since 1988.

=== Administrative functions ===
She is a member of several scientific commissions or councils, of societies including the French Association of Arachnology (AsFrA). Since 2021, she has also been president of Opie, the Office for Insects and their Environment.

== Work ==
Christine Rollard is particularly interested in the link between spiders and their environment and seeks as much as possible to transmit her knowledge. Her scientific activities have focused on systematics, bioecology and faunistics in different geographical areas with participation in around fifteen study programs on biodiversity, in metropolitan France (Brenne, Auvergne, Normandy, Mercantour, Corsica), Overseas (Guadeloupe, Martinique and Reunion), Africa (Guinea and Comoros) and Vanuatu (Santo).

She participates in the other statutory missions of the museum: teaching, expertise as a spiderologist (customs), responsible for the conservation of the Museum's spider collection, which is the third largest in the world, dissemination of knowledge to schools and the general public (like Fred Vargas for his book Quand sort la recluse) in the form of conferences, interventions through various media, popular articles or books. Her passion for spiders earned her the nicknames "Madame Spider" and "Spiderwoman".

She is one of the scientific curators of an exhibition entitled "Au fil des araignées", which has been traveling since 2008 in partnership with the Museum and the Espace des sciences de Rennes.

== Distinctions ==
- Knight of the Legion of Honor in 2011.

== Some described taxa ==
- Cembalea affinis Rollard & Wesolowska, 2002
- Denisiphantes Tu, Li & Rollard, 2005
- Evarcha bakorensis Rollard & Wesolowska, 2002
- Evarcha certa Rollard & Wesolowska, 2002
- Evarcha maculata Rollard & Wesolowska, 2002
- Gramenca Rollard & Wesolowska, 2002
- Gramenca prima Rollard & Wesolowska, 2002
- Heliophanus heurtaultae Rollard & Wesolowska, 2002
- Lamottella Rollard & Wesolowska, 2002
- Lamottella longipes Rollard & Wesolowska, 2002
- Langelurillus horrifer Rollard & Wesolowska, 2002
- Nimbarus Rollard & Wesolowska, 2002
- Nimbarus pratensis Rollard & Wesolowska, 2002
- Plexippus fuscus Rollard & Wesolowska, 2002
- Rhene formosa Rollard & Wesolowska, 2002
- Toticoryx Rollard & Wesolowska, 2002
- Toticoryx exilis Rollard & Wesolowska, 2002

== Publications ==
=== Works ===
- Arachna : les voyages d'une femme araignée avec Vincent Tardieu, Éditions Belin, 2011
- Fascinantes araignées avec Philippe Blanchot, Éditions Quae, 2014, 3ème édition 2021
- À la découverte des araignées : araignées de nos régions, sachez les reconnaître: un guide de terrain pour comprendre la nature» avec Alain Canard, Éditions Dunod, 2015, nouvelle édition 2022
- La fonction venimeuse, coordination de l’ouvrage avec Jean-Philippe Chippaux et Max Goyffon, Éditions Lavoisier, 2015
- Les mondes invisibles des animaux microscopiques » avec Hélène Rajcak, Damien Laverdunt, Cédric Hubas, Éditions Actes Sud Junio, 2016
- Je n’ai plus peur des araignées !, avec Abdelkader Mokeddem, Éditions Dunod, 2018
- 50 idées fausses sur les araignées, Éditions Quae, 2020
- Le monde soyeux des araignées, Bayard, 2021

=== Articles ===
- Rollard C. (1984), Composition et structure de la biocénose consommatrice des aranéides. Revue Arachnologique, 5 (4), 211-237 ;
- Rollard C. (1985), Sur le développement et la biologie d'un hyménoptère Tromatobia ornata consommateur des œufs de l'araignée Argiope bruennichi. Bulletin de la Société Scientifique de Bretagne, (57) (3, 4) : 143-148 ;
- Rollard C. (1987), La biocénose associée aux aranéides, en landes armoricaines. Étude des relations insectes-araignées. Thèse de doctorat de l'Université de Rennes I, juin 1987, 292 pp. ;
- Rollard C. (1990), Approche éco-biologique de l'interaction araignée/insecte arachnophage à travers l'exemple d'Argiope bruennichi / Tromatobia Ornata. Bulletin de la Société de Zoologie française, (115) (4) : 379 - 385 ;
- Rollard C. (1993), The spiders of the high-altitude meadows of Mont Nimba (West Africa) : a preliminary report. Memoirs of the Queensland Museum, 33 (2) : 629-634. Brisbane.
- Rollard C. & W. Wesolowska (2002), Jumping spiders (Araneae, Salticidae) from the Nimba Mountains in Guinea. Zoosystema, 24 (2) : 283-307 (texte intégral) ;
- P. Maréchal & C. Rollard (2002), Inventaire des araignées du Parc national de la Guadeloupe. Premiers résultats. In : Inventaire et cartographie des invertébrés comme contribution à la gestion des milieux naturels français. Actes du 3e séminaire, Besançon (juillet 1999) : 265-267 ;
- Peng X.-J., Li S.-Q. & Rollard C. (2003), A review of the Chinese jumping spiders studied by Dr E. Schenkel (Araneae : Salticidae). Rev. Suisse zool. 110 (1) : 91-109 ;
- Rollard C. (2004) - Les araignées et autres arachnides et leur commerce. Bulletin de la Société zoologique de France, 2003, 129 (1-2) : 29-36.
- Dubois J., Rollard C., Villemant C. & Gauld I.D. (2004) - Phylogenetic position of spiders parasitoids within Pimplinae (Hymoneptera, Ichneumonidae). CR Coll. in Hungary (Szombathely) 2002, Plant Protection Institute & Berzsenyi College, Budapest, Samu & Szinetar eds. : 27-35.
- Tu Lihong, Li Shuqiang & Rollard C. (2005) – A review of six linyphiid spiders described from China by Dr E. Schenkel (Araneae : Linyphiidae). Revue Suisse de Zoologie, 112(3): 647-660.
- Pommier P., Rollard C. & de Haro L. (2005) - Morsures d'Araignées : les aranéismes d'importance médicale. Presse médicale, 34 : 49-56.
- Szuts T. & C. Rollard (2007) - Redescription of the genus Tarne Simon, 1886 (Araneae: Salticidae). Insect Systematics and Evolution, 38 : 427-432.
- Knoflach B., C. Rollard & K. Thaler (2009) – Note on Mediterranean Theridiidae (Araneae).II. ZooKeys 16:227-264.
- Hervé C. & C. Rollard (2009) –Drassodes species from the Parc national du Mercantour (French Alps), with the description of a new species (Araneae, Gnaphosidae). Contribution to Natural History, 12: 627-642.
- Rollard C., Goyffon M. & Guette C. (2010) - L'aranéisme. In Urgence Pratique Publications (Ed.) : Aspects cliniques et thérapeutiques des envenimations graves. Chap. 18 Arthropodes : 204-212.
- Rollard C. (2010) - Diversity of Spiders. In Zoosystema : Special Issue/SANTO 2006 - Other Invertebrates : 28-31.
- Vergnes A., Pellissier V., Lemperière G., Rollard C. & Clergeau P. (2013) – Urban densification causes the decline of ground –dwelling arthropods. Biodiversity and conservation: 1-19.
- Takeshi Yamasaki, Christine Rollard (2022) - Redescription of Sphecotypus taprobanicus Simon 1897 (Araneae: Corinnidae). Acta Arachnologica (vol. 71) : 49–51
- Christine Rollard, Paul Y. C, David J. Court, Elise-Anne Leguin (2022) - Notes on the black-and-gold huntsman spider, Thelcticopis orichalcea (Simon, 1880), a charismatic Southeast-Asian species (Araneae: Sparassidae: Sparianthinae). Nature in Singapour
- Victor Robin-Havret, Yvan Montardi, Claire Jacquet & Christine Rollard (2024) - État des lieux de la présence d’Hasarius adansoni (Savigny & Audouin, 1826) en France métropolitaine. Revue arachnologique, série 2, n° 10, décembre 2023 : 17 - 22.
