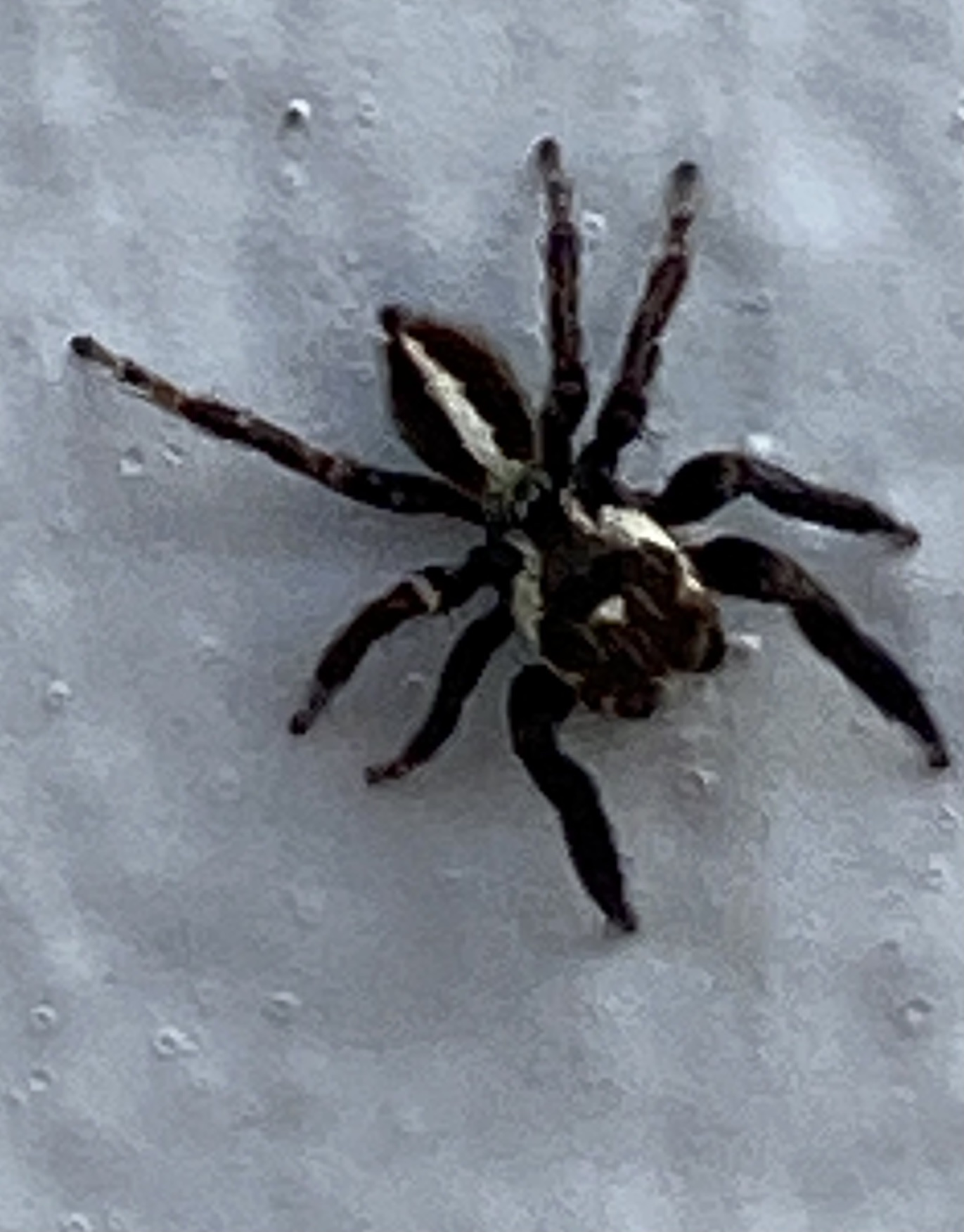
- Evarcha denticulata seen in the Western Cape
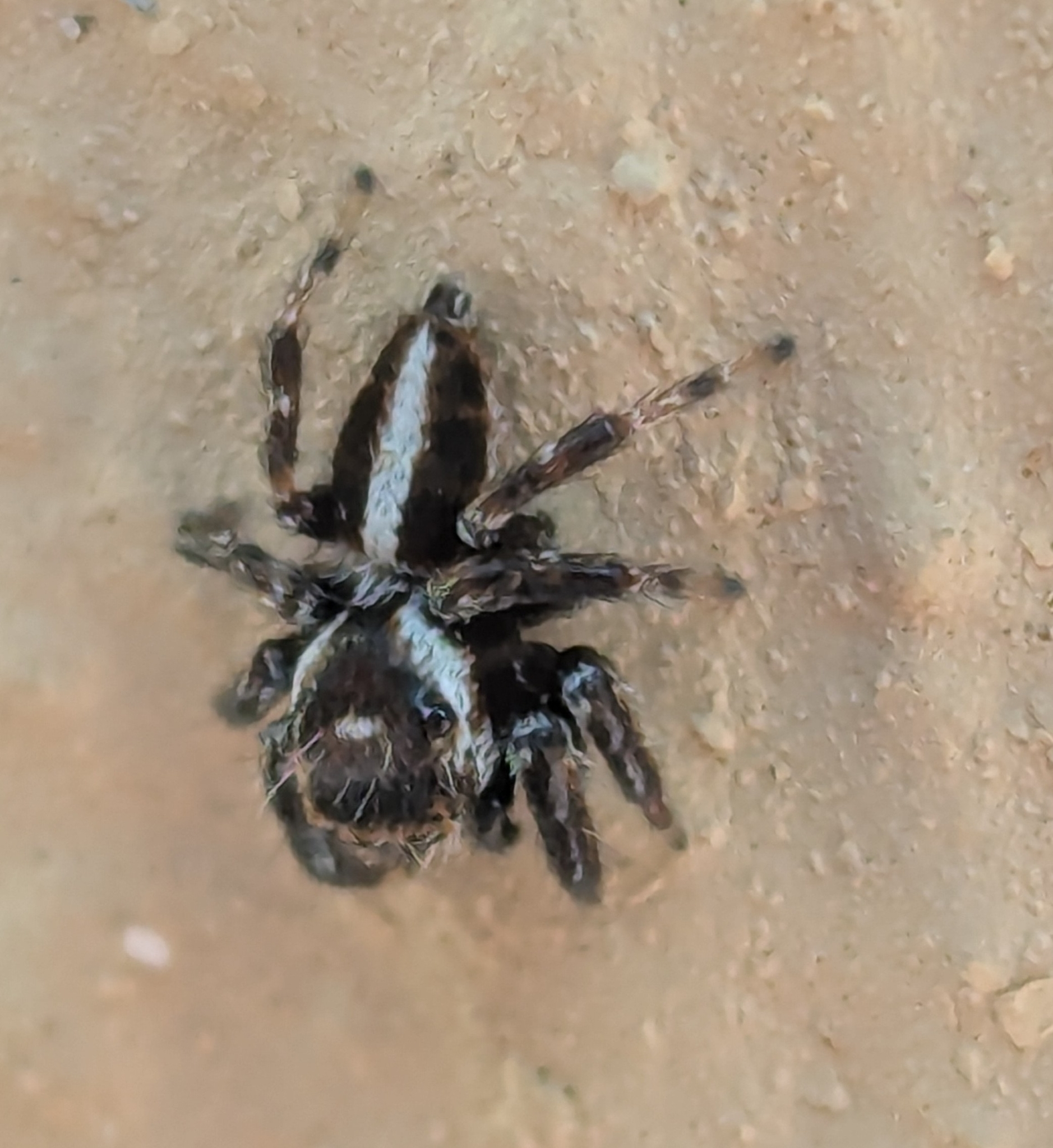

Conservation status
- Least Concern (IUCN 3.1)

Scientific classification
- Kingdom: Animalia
- Phylum: Arthropoda
- Subphylum: Chelicerata
- Class: Arachnida
- Order: Araneae
- Infraorder: Araneomorphae
- Family: Salticidae
- Genus: Evarcha
- Species: E. denticulata

Binomial name
- Evarcha denticulata Wesołowska & Haddad, 2013

Synonyms
- Evawes denticulata (Wesołowska & & Haddad, 2013)

= Evarcha denticulata =

Species of jumping spider

Evarcha denticulata, the Paterson Evarcha Jumping Spider, is a species of jumping spider that is endemic to South Africa. A member of the genus Evarcha, it is ground-dwelling spider, thriving in the fynbos found in the Eastern and Western Capes. The spider is small, with a rounded forward section, or cephalothorax, that is usually between 2.1 and 2.5 mm (0.08 and 0.10 in) long and, behind that, an ovoid abdomen that is between 1.8 and 3.4 mm (0.07 and 0.13 in) long. The female has a larger abdomen than the male. It is also lighter, with a pattern of grey patches visible on its yellow background. The male is generally blackish-brown. Both have three lines of white hairs on the spider's cheeks. The male Evarcha denticulata has a distinctive tooth on the spike, or apophysis, that emanates from its palpal tibia, part of its copulatory organs, which is recalled in the specific name. The species was first described in 2013 by Wanda Wesołowska and Charles Hadded.

== Taxonomy ==
Evarcha denticulata is a species of jumping spider, a member of the family Salticidae, that was first described by the arachnologists Wanda Wesołowska and Charles Haddad in 2013. The authors described the male and female in different papers published in the same year. It was one of over 500 species identified by Wesołowska during her career. The species is named for a Latin word that can be translated "tooth", and points to the tooth on the spider's copulatory organs. They allocated it to the genus Evarcha, first circumscribed by Eugène Simon in 1902. The genus is one of the largest, with members found on four continents.

In 1976, Jerzy Prószyński had placed the genus Evarcha in the subfamily Pelleninae, along with the genera Bianor and Pellenes. He subsequently added the genus to a group of genera named Evarchines, named after the genus, along with the genera Hasarinella and Nigorella, based on similarities in the spiders' copulatory organs. In Wayne Maddison's 2015 study of spider phylogenetic classification, the genus was ascribed to the subtribe Plexippina alongside the related genera Hyllus and Plexippus. This is a member of the tribe Plexippini, in the subclade Simonida in the clade Saltafresia.

Prószyński placed the spider in a new genus Evawes in 2018 based on its copulatory organs and the way that they differ from other Evarcha spiders. The new genus name is a combination of Evacha and Wesołowska. This designation is not widely accepted and the species remains in the Evarcha genus in the World Spider Catalog. The spider has a common name of Paterson Evarcha Jumping Spider.

== Description ==
Evarcha denticulata is a small spider. The spider's body is divided into two main parts: a rather rounded almost rectangular cephalothorax and more pointed and ovoid abdomen. The male has cephalothorax that is typically 2.1 mm (0.08 in) long and 1.5 mm (0.06 in) wide. The spider's carapace, the hard upper part of the cephalothorax, is high and generally male is with a lighter brown flat patch in the middle. The eye field is separated from the thorax by a line of white hairs that extends onto the carapace. There are long brown bristles on the eye field and fawn and white scales near the eyes themselves. The underside of the cephalothorax, or sternum, is dark brown. The clypeus have a few long white bristles on it and the spider's cheeks are marked with white hairs forming three lines. The spider's mouthparts, including the chelicerae, are dark brown.

The male spider's abdomen is typically 1.8 mm (0.07 in) long and 1.2 mm (0.05 in) wide. It is also blackish-brown on top with a pattern of white hairs forming a streak along the front edge and a band across the middle broken up by large spots to the rear. The underside is dark and has a marking of pale dots making up four lines grey. The spinnerets are also dark. It has dark brown legs that have hairs and spines that are mainly dark brown, although a few of the hairs are lighter.

An inspection of the male's copulatory organs enables it to be distinguished from other species in the genus. Its pedipalps, sensory organs near the mouth, are dark brown. Its cymbium is hairy and its palpal bulb is rounded and bulbous. It has a large bulging protrusion at its base and a sharp embolus projecting from the top of the bulb. The palpal tibia has a cluster of long hairs and a long protrusion, or tibial apophysis that has a flattened end and a tooth protruding from the bottom. The spider is similar to the related Evarcha vittula but can be distinguished by the shape of the tibial apophysis and the T-shaped marking on its abdomen.

The female is slightly larger in size to the male, with a cephalothorax that is between 2.4 and 2.5 mm (0.09 and 0.10 in) long, and 1.8 and 1.9 mm (0.07 and 0.07 in) wide and an ovoid abdomen that is between 3.1 and 3.4 mm (0.12 and 0.13 in) in length and 2.5 and 2.7 mm (0.10 and 0.11 in) in width. The carapace is high and brown. There are blackish areas and white patches near the eyes, the hairs that form the latter radiating in lines down the slopes of the carapace. The underside is light brown on top and light brown underneath. The female spider has similar long white bristles on its clypeus and white lines on its cheeks to the male. Like the male, the mouthparts, including the chelicerae, are dark brown, but there are pale tips on its labium and maxillae.

The female's abdomen is larger and lighter than the male's. It is yellowish and marked with a pattern of oblique streaks formed by dark grey patches on the top and light yellow with greyish patches underneath. There are long white bristles at the very front of the abdomen and dark spinnerets at the rear. The spider's legs are mainly light brown, with some darker segments, many spines and brown leg hairs. Like the male, the female has distinctive copulatory organs. There is a very wide pocket in the epigastric furrow at the very rear of its small epigyne. The two copulatory openings lead to relatively short and wide insemination ducts and spermathecae, or receptacles, that have thick walls and strong sclerotization.

== Distribution and habitat ==
Evarcha spiders live across the world, although those found in North America may be migrants accidental carried as part of shipments transported across the ocean. They are particularly common in Africa and East Asia. Evarcha denticulata is endemic to South Africa. The male holotype was discovered on a grassy tussock 10 km (6.2 mi) from Paterson in the Eastern Cape in 2011. Other examples have been found in urban areas like Cape Town in the Western Cape and at high altitudes in the Amathole Mountains, typically at a height of 1,270 m (4,170 ft) above sea level. The first female specimen to be identified was found in Fisherhaven in 2004 and they were subsequently observed in areas like Jeffrey's Bay as well as the Amathole Mountains. The spider is ground-dwelling and is seen in the leaf litter and grasslands that is found in fynbos. It is often seen living underneath overhanging vegetation.
