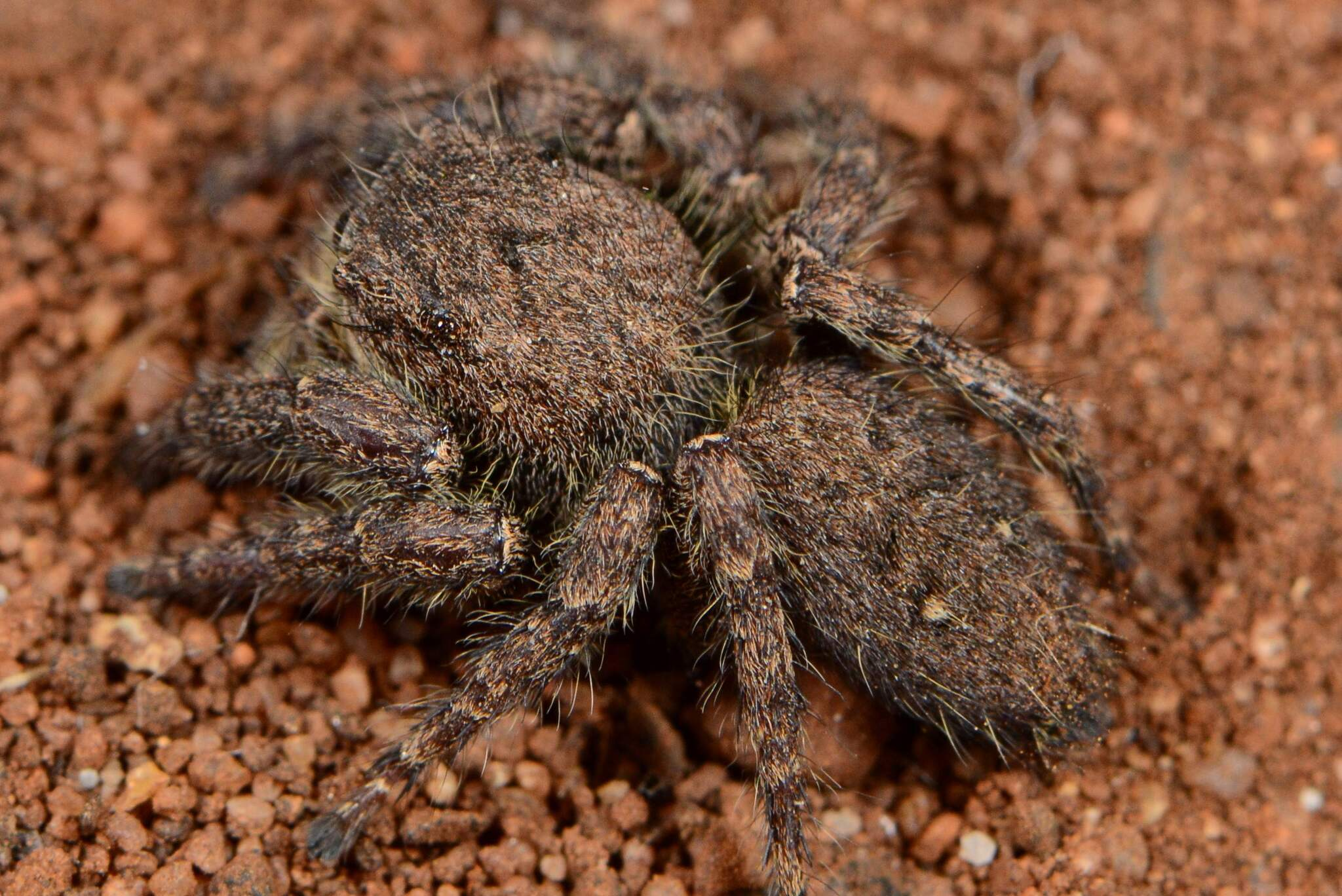
- Female N. hirsuta
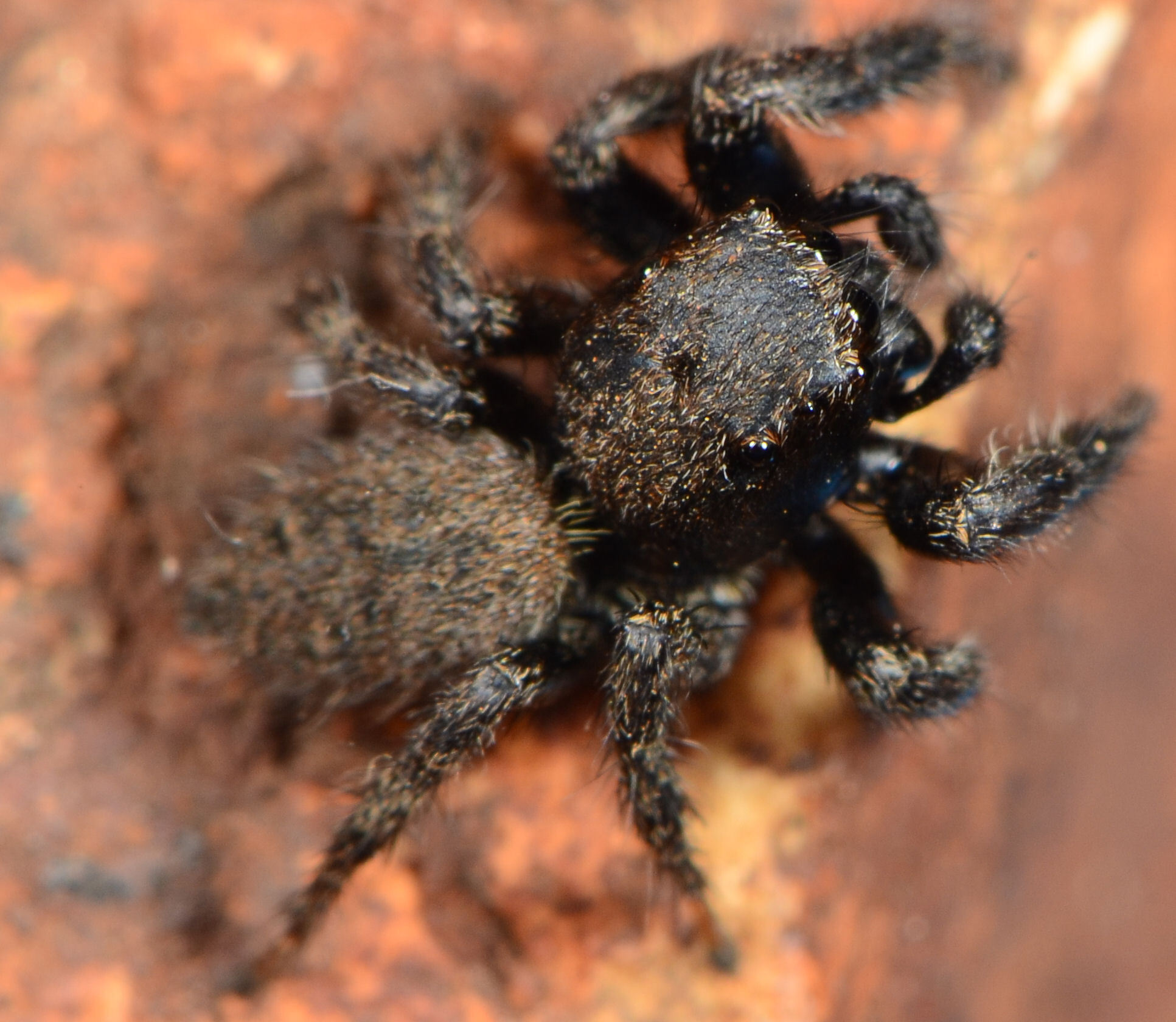
- Male N. hirsuta

Scientific classification
- Kingdom: Animalia
- Phylum: Arthropoda
- Subphylum: Chelicerata
- Class: Arachnida
- Order: Araneae
- Infraorder: Araneomorphae
- Family: Salticidae
- Genus: Nigorella
- Species: N. hirsuta

Binomial name
- Nigorella hirsuta Wesołowska, 2009

= Nigorella hirsuta =

Species of spider

Nigorella hirsuta is a species of jumping spider in the genus Nigorella that lives in South Africa and Zimbabwe. The spider is medium-sized, with a forward section, or carapace, that is between 3.5 and 4.7 mm (0.14 and 0.19 in) long and, behind that, an abdomen that is between 3.2 and 6.6 mm (0.13 and 0.26 in) long. The female is larger than the male. The spider's carapace is generally dark brown and hairy. While the male's abdomen is similarly hairy and dark brown, the female's abdomen is more grey. The species has been confused with the related Nigorella plebeja. However, it can be generally identified by the strongly sclerotized cups in the female epigyne, the external visible part of its reproductive system, and the male's longer embolus, a projection that forms part of its reproductive system. It was first described in 2009 by Wanda Wesołowska.

== Taxonomy and etymology ==
Nigorella hirsuta is a species of jumping spider, a member of the family Salticidae, that was first described by the Polish arachnologist Wanda Wesołowska in 2009. It is one of over 500 species identified by the scientist. She allocated it to the genus Nigorella, which she had raised with her colleague Beata Tomasiewicz in 2008. The genus name is described as an arbitrary arrangement of letters. The specific name is a Latin word that recalls the hairy body of the spider.

Medium-sized to large, the spiders resemble Hyllus, but differ in the design of its copulatory organs. In 2015, the Canadian biologist Wayne Maddison listed the genus in the subtribe Plexippina in the tribe Plexippini. Previously termed Plexippeae, by the French naturalist Eugène Simon in 1901, this tribe is part of the clade Saltafresia. In 2017, the genus was grouped with seven other genera of jumping spiders under the name Evarchines, named after the genus Evarcha, by the Polish arachnologist Jerzy Prószyński.

== Description ==
Nigorella hirsuta is a medium-sized spider. The male has an oval dark brown carapace, the upper hardened surface of its forward section, that is covered in scales and dark hairs. It is typically between 3.5 and 3.7 mm (0.14 and 0.15 in) long and 2.7 and 2.9 mm (0.11 and 0.11 in) wide. Its eye field is short and black. The part of its face known as its clypeus is low, dark and covered in black hairs. The spider is unidentate with its chelicerae only showing a single tooth. Its remaining mouthparts, including its labium and maxillae, are dark brown with narrow whitish edges.

The spider's abdomen is slightly narrower, between 3.2 and 3.5 mm (0.13 and 0.14 in) long and between 2.1 and 2.3 mm (0.083 and 0.091 in) wide. It is oval and dark brown with a covering of dense long dark hairs. There are traces of lighter patches visible on the top side and four rows of yellowish dots underneath. Its spinnerets are dark and its legs are dark brown with long dark leg hairs. The front pair of legs are slightly thicker than the rest. Its copulatory organs are distinctive. Its pedipalps are dark with a straight appendage, or apophysis, attached to its tibia. Attached to the tibia is a round tegulum that ends in an embolus that has an tegular apophysis attached to it with a membrane.

The female is similar in shape to the male but significantly larger. It has a carapace that measures between 4.4 and 4.7 mm (0.17 and 0.19 in) in length and between 3.1 and 3.7 mm (0.12 and 0.15 in) in width and an abdomen that is between 6.4 and 6.6 mm (0.25 and 0.26 in) long and between 4.2 and 4.7 mm (0.17 and 0.19 in) wide. Its carapace is dark brown with dark hairs like the male while its abdomen is dark grey on top and dark with four rows of white dots on the bottom. The spider's epigyne, the external visible part of its copulatory organs, has marked sclerotization. There are two widely spaced depressions and a broad pocket visible on it. The internal structure of its reproductive system is relatively simple with the seminal ducts having limited loops.

The spider is similar to others in the genus. It can be distinguished by its longer embolus and the strongly sclerotized cups in the female that hide the gonopores. The pocket in its epigyne is also smaller than Nigorella albimana. It has been confused with the related Nigorella plebeja, with examples of this species being initially incorrectly allocated.

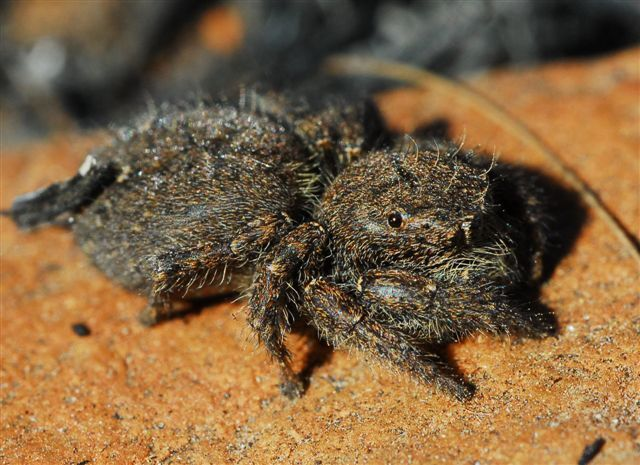
female

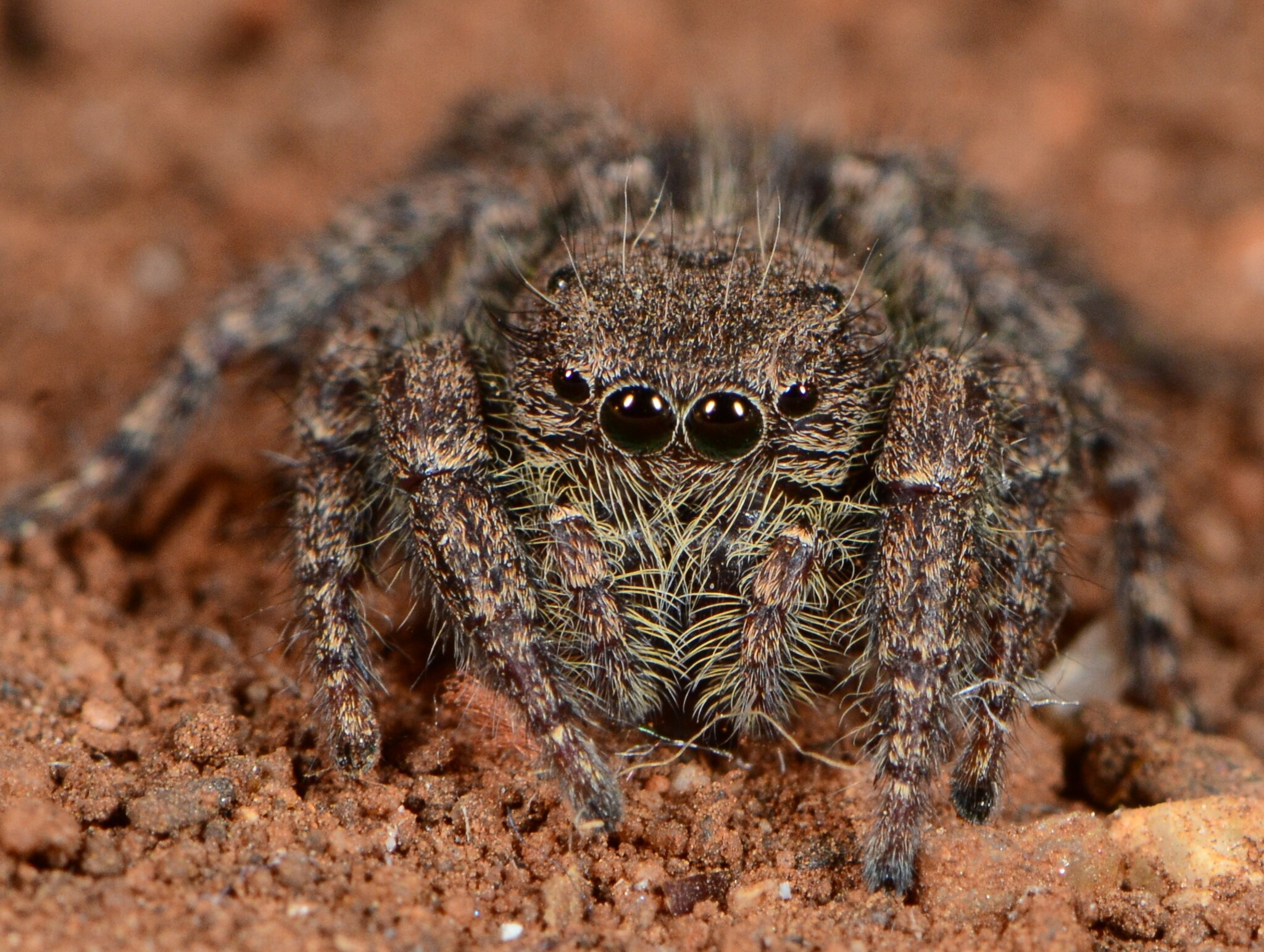
female

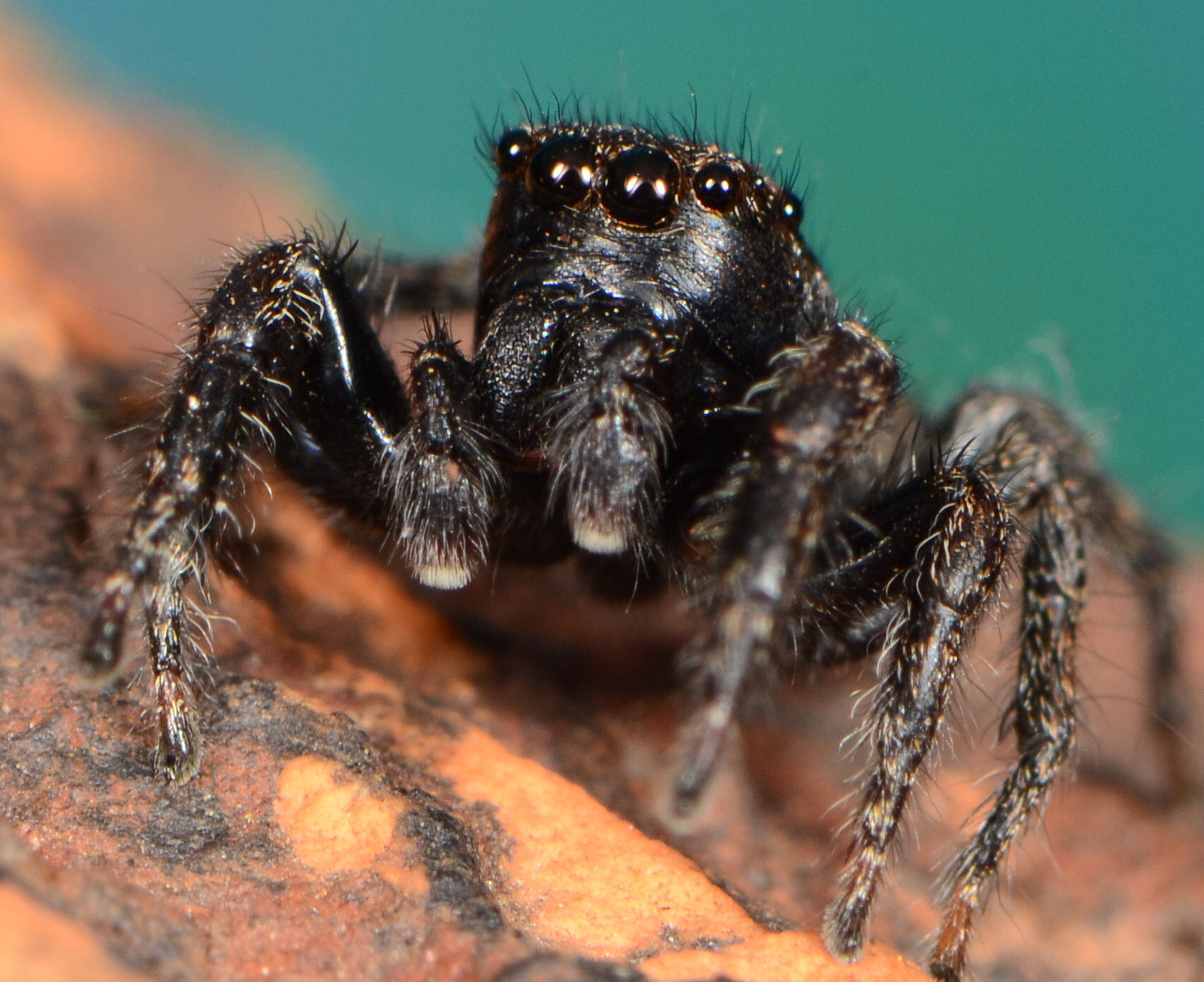
male

== Distribution and habitat ==
Nigorella hirsuta lives in Mozambique, South Africa and Zimbabwe. It is known to have a range that stretches across central and eastern South Africa. The holotype was collected from the Sengwa Wildlife Research Area in Zimbabwe in 2001 by Meg Cumming. It has also been found in the Sandveld Nature Reserve in Free State, Ndumo Game Reserve in KwaZulu-Natal, Thabela Thabeng Mountain Retreat near Potchefstroom in North West province, all in South Africa, and near Bulawayo, Zimbabwe. The species prefers woodland areas populated with species like Searsia lancea. It is a ground-dwelling spider often found at the bottom of grass tussocks. In Mozambique and Zimbabwe, it has been found in plant litter, sometimes under Acacia trees near rivers. Its conservation status is of Least Concern.
