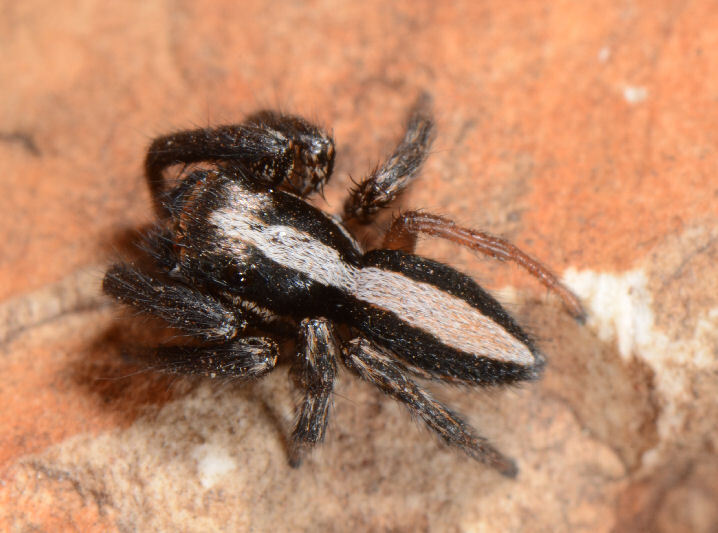
- male
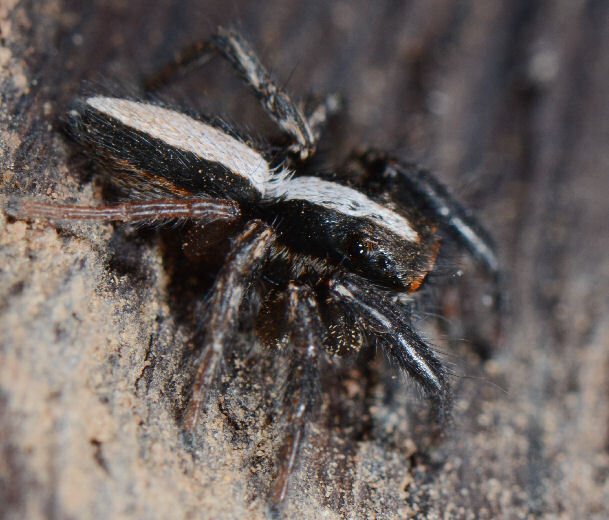
- male

Conservation status
- Least Concern (IUCN 3.1)

Scientific classification
- Kingdom: Animalia
- Phylum: Arthropoda
- Subphylum: Chelicerata
- Class: Arachnida
- Order: Araneae
- Infraorder: Araneomorphae
- Family: Salticidae
- Genus: Evarcha
- Species: E. vittula

Binomial name
- Evarcha vittula Haddad & Wesołowska, 2011

= Evarcha vittula =

Species of spider

Evarcha vittula, the White-banded Evarcha Jumping Spider, is a species of jumping spider in the genus Evarcha that lives in South Africa. The species was first described in 2011 by Charles Haddad and Wanda Wesołowska. The spider is small, with a carapace measuring between 2.4 and 3.2 mm (0.09 and 0.13 in) long and an abdomen between 2.5 and 3.6 mm (0.10 and 0.14 in) long. There is a delicate scutum on the abdomen. The spider is generally dark brown but there is an orange streak down the middle of the upper surface of both the abdomen and carapace. This streak helps distinguish the spider from others in the genus. It can also be identified by its copulatory organs. The male has a characteristic short straight embolus. The female has not been described.

== Taxonomy ==
Evarcha vittula is a species of jumping spider that was first described by Charles Haddad and Wanda Wesołowska in 2011. The spider's name derives from the Latin word vitta, which can be translated to "fillet" or "band" and relates to the pattern on its abdomen. It is known as the White-banded Evarcha Jumping Spider. It was one of over 500 species identified by the Polish arachnologist Wesołowska during her career, making her one of the most prolific in the field. They allocated it to the genus Evarcha, first circumscribed by Eugène Simon in 1902. The genus is one of the largest, with members found on four continents.

In 1976, Jerzy Prószyński placed the genus in the subfamily Pelleninae, along with the genera Bianor and Pellenes. In Wayne Maddison's 2015 study of spider phylogenetic classification, the genus Evarcha was moved to the subtribe Plexippina. This is a member of the tribe Plexippini, in the subclade Simonida in the clade Saltafresia. It is closer to the genera Hyllus and Plexippus. Analysis of protein-coding genes showed it was particularly related to Telamonia. In the following year, Prószyński added the genus to a group of genera named Evarchines, named after the genus, along with Hasarinella and Nigorella based on similarities in the spiders' copulatory organs.

== Description ==
Evarcha vittula is small to medium-sized with looks that are typical for the genus. The male has a carapace that is between 2.4 and 3.2 mm (0.09 and 0.13 in) long and 1.8 and 2.0 mm (0.07 and 0.08 in) wide. It is a dark brown oval spider with an orange streak down the middle of the top and white hairs on the side. The eye field is black with fawn scales around the front eyes. The underside, or sternum, is light brown. The mouthparts are distinctive with black chelicerae, brown labium and brown maxillae that have lighter edges where they chew. The spider's abdomen is similar in size to the carapace, measuring 2.5 and 3.6 mm (0.10 and 0.14 in) long and 1.5 and 1.7 mm (0.06 and 0.07 in) wide. There is a delicate scutum on the front third of the abdomen. The underside is grey and has two narrow dark stripes. The spider has grey spinnerets. The dark brown legs have dense dark hairs and many spines. The pedipalps are brown.

The spider has distinctive copulatory organs. There is a long straight projection from the palpal tibia called a tibial apophysis. The palpal bulb is rounded with a bulge sticking out of the middle and a very short embolus. The tibia has long hairs, with shorter hairs projecting from the palpal bulb itself. The female has not been described.

The species can be distinguished from others in the genus by the striped pattern on its abdomen. The majority of Evarcha spiders have some form of more complex pattern instead. For example, it is possible to tell the spider apart from the related Evarcha denticulata by the fact that the pattern on its abdomen is roughly T-shaped on the other species. The identity of the spider can be further confirmed by an assessment of its copulatory organs. The tibial apophysis is characteristic. It is also the short straight, rather than curved, embolus that is particularly helpful when comparing to the otherwise similar Evarcha maculata.

== Distribution and habitat ==
Evarcha spiders live across the world, although those found in North America may be accidental migrants. The genus is found in many parts of Africa. Evarcha vittula is endemic to South Africa. The male holotype for the species was found in the Erfenis Dam Nature Reserve in Free State in 2009. Examples have also been found across the province including in the Willem Pretorius Game Reserve. The first example seen outside the province was collected in 2010 in KwaZulu-Natal. It is likely to also live in the provinces of Gauteng, Northern Cape and North West.

In comparison to other spiders in the genus, Evarcha vittula prefers to live in grass-dominated environments. It thrives in open grasslands with scattered trees, living under rocks and on grass tussocks woodlands. Some examples have been found amongst woodland of Rhus lancea trees. Others have been seen openly on the exposed surface of rocks.
