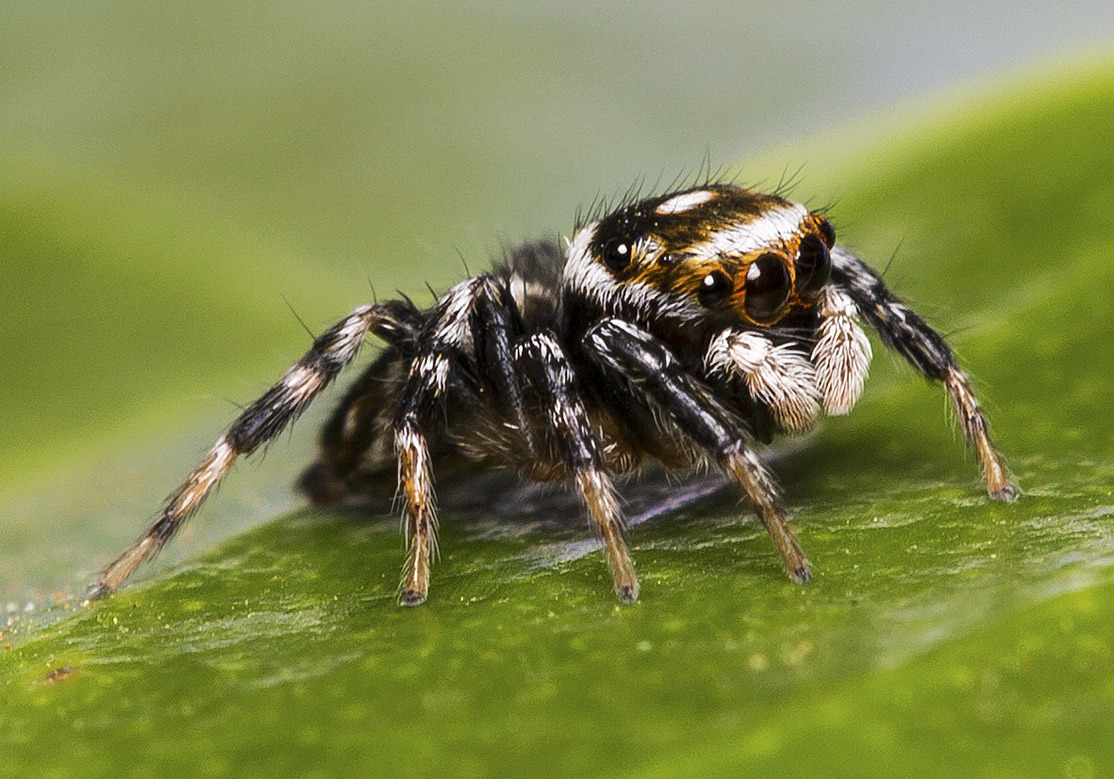

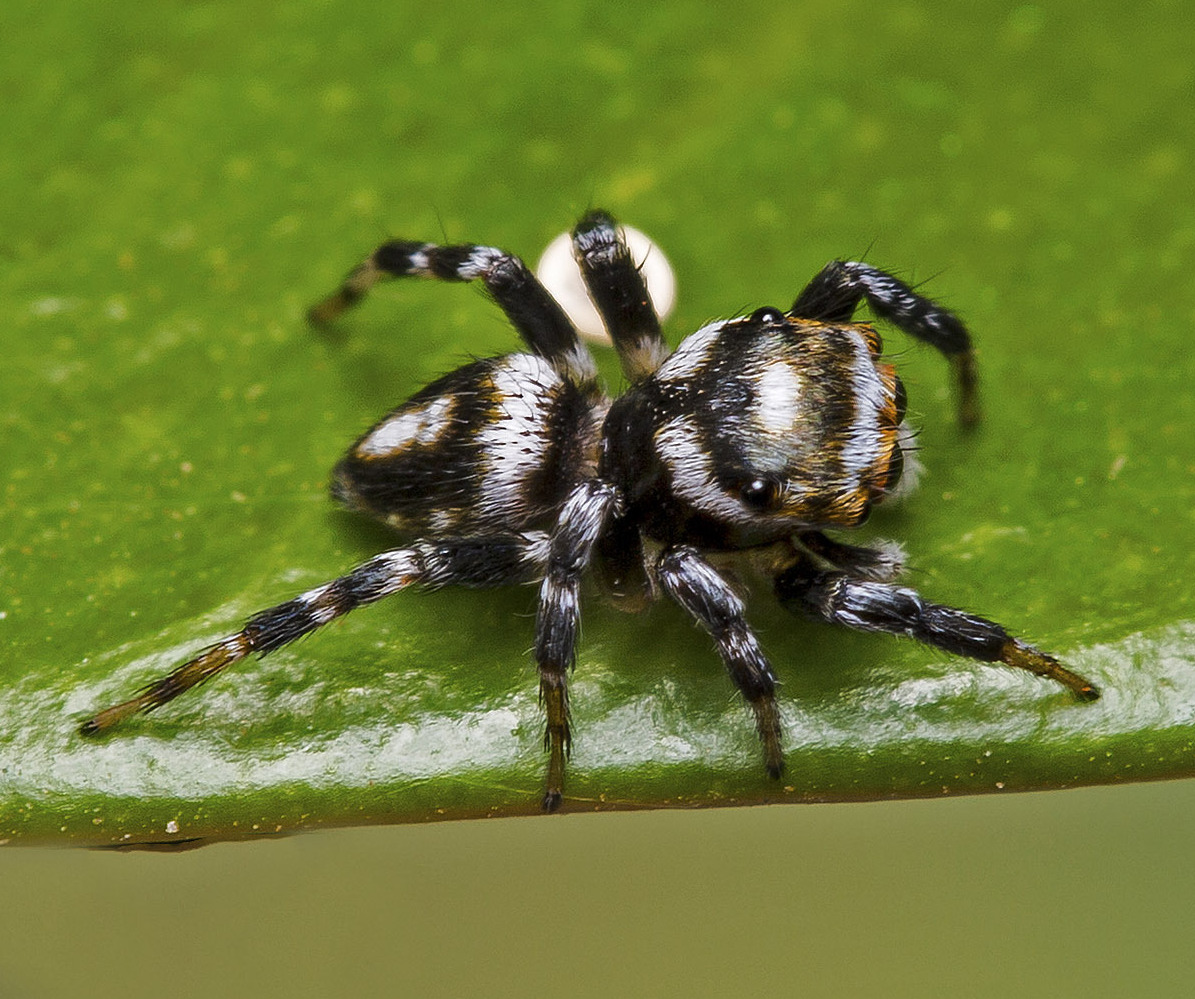

Scientific classification
- Kingdom: Animalia
- Phylum: Arthropoda
- Subphylum: Chelicerata
- Class: Arachnida
- Order: Araneae
- Infraorder: Araneomorphae
- Family: Salticidae
- Genus: Evarcha
- Species: E. mirabilis

Binomial name
- Evarcha mirabilis Wesołowska & Haddad, 2009

Synonyms
- Evawes mirabilis (Wesołowska & Haddad, 2009)

= Evarcha mirabilis =

Species of spider

Evarcha mirabilis is a species of jumping spider in the genus Evarcha that lives in South Africa. The species was first described in 2009 by Wanda Wesołowska and Charles Haddad. The spider is small, with a dark brown carapace measuring typically 1.9 mm (0.07 in) long and a russet-brown abdomen that is typically 1.7 mm (0.07 in) long. It is similar to related species in the genus, particularly Evarcha maculata and Evarcha patagiata. The spider has a yellow pattern on the top of its abdomen, its underside being a uniform yellow, while the underside of the carapace is orange. The legs individually have a pattern of yellow, black, yellow. The pedipalps are similarly yellow and black. The male can be distinguished from others in the genus by its copulatory organs, particularly the shape of the projection from its palpal tibia or tibial apophysis, which is short and sharp and connected to the tibia through a large base. The female has yet to be described.

== Taxonomy ==
Evarcha mirabilis is a species of jumping spider that was first described by Wanda Wesołowska and Charles Haddad in 2009. It was one of over 500 species identified by the Polish arachnologist Wesołowska during her career, making her one of the most prolific in the field. They allocated it to the genus Evarcha, first circumscribed by Eugène Simon in 1902. The genus is one of the largest, with members found on four continents.

In 1976, Jerzy Prószyński placed the genus was placed in the subfamily Pelleninae, along with the genera Bianor and Pellenes. In Wayne Maddison's 2015 study of spider phylogenetic classification, the genus Evarcha was moved to the subtribe Plexippina. This is a member of the tribe Plexippini, in the subclade Simonida in the clade Saltafresia. It is closer to the genera Hyllus and Plexippus. Analysis of protein-coding genes showed it was particularly related to Telamonia. In the following year, Prószyński added the genus to a group of genera named Evarchines, named after the genus, along with Hasarinella and Nigorella based on similarities in the spiders' copulatory organs.

Prószyński placed the spider in a new genus Evawes in 2018, a new genus name based on a combination of Evarcha and Wesołowska. This designation is not widely accepted and the species remains in the Evarcha genus in the World Spider Catalog. The species is named for a Latin word for a "admirable".

== Description ==
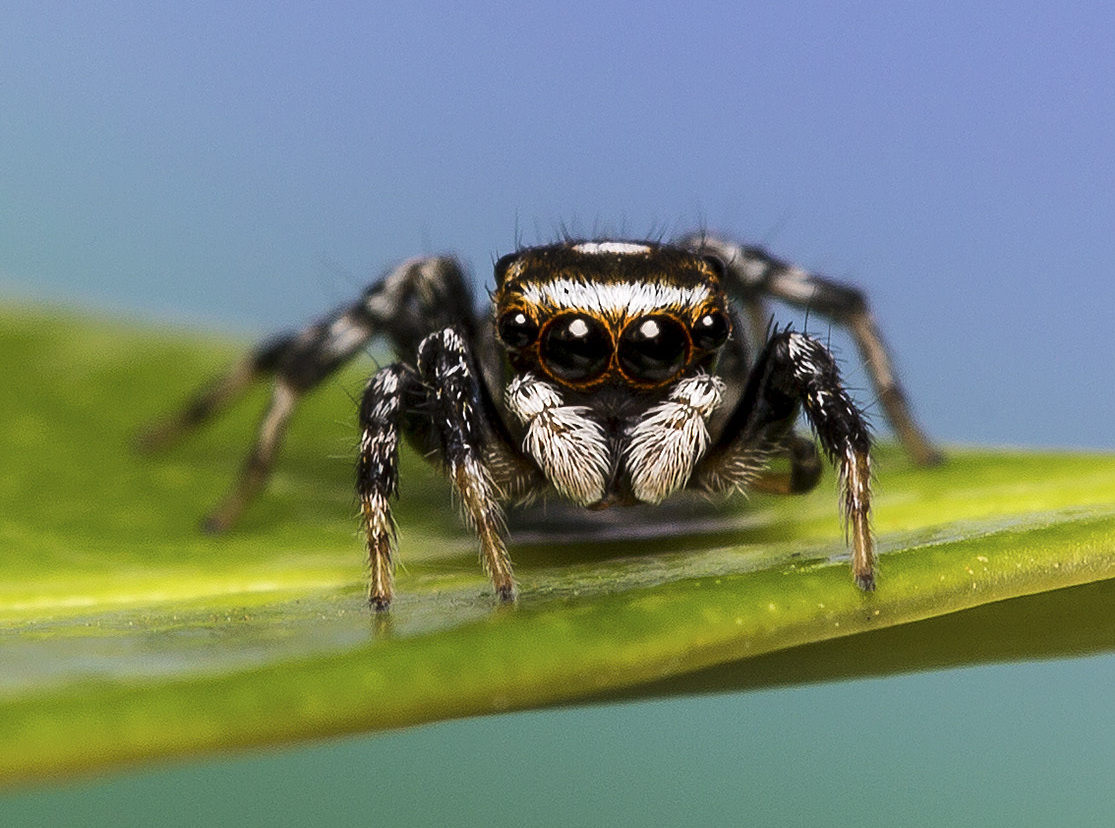

Evarcha mirabilis is small with looks that are typical for the genus. The male has a carapace that is typically 1.9 mm (0.07 in) long and 1.4 mm (0.06 in) wide. It is rather high high and generally dark brown on top apart from two lighter semicircular areas towards the front. The eye field is similar, with long brown bristles near the eyes, fawn scales around the foremost eyes, while white scale-like hairs cover much of the entire surface. The spider's clypeus, or face, is similarly dark brown. The mouthparts are distinctive with a chelicerae that have a single tooth and a brown labium. The underside, or sternum, is orange.

The male spider's abdomen is smaller than its carapace, measuring typically 1.7 mm (0.07 in) in length and having a width of typically 1.1 mm (0.04 in). The topside is russet-brown with a yellow pattern of three thin stripes that cross the body, interrupted by a pattern of a very deep chevron tessellating with the wings of a dove. The underside is dark yellow. The spider has grey spinnerets. The legs yellow to the top and bottom with a central black portion. The copulatory organs have a similar pattern. The pedipalps are likewise yellow and black. The palpal femur is yellow, much of the remainder black. The palpal tibia has a projection with a very broad-base and sharp tip called a tibial apophysis. It has small teeth visible on its sides. The palpal bulb is rounded with a tegulum that a large lump near the bottom and a particularly short thin embolus. The female has not been described.

The species is similar to other African spiders of the genus. For example, it has similarities with Evarcha patagiata, with which it shares the fact that its embolus is narrower than some spiders in the genus. It is particularly related to Evarcha maculata. The two species can be differentiated by a study of the tibial apophyses, and identified Evarcha mirabilis through the species' distinctive wider projection base.

== Distribution and habitat ==
Evarcha spiders live across the world, although those found in North America may be accidental migrants. The genus is found across Africa. Evarcha mirabilis is endemic to South Africa. The holotype for the species was found in the Ndumo Game Reserve in KwaZulu-Natal in 2005. It has also been found in Western Cape. The first example was discovered in 2017 in Rawsonville. The spider lives on the ground in broadleaf forests. It particularly thrives in fynbos and savanna.
