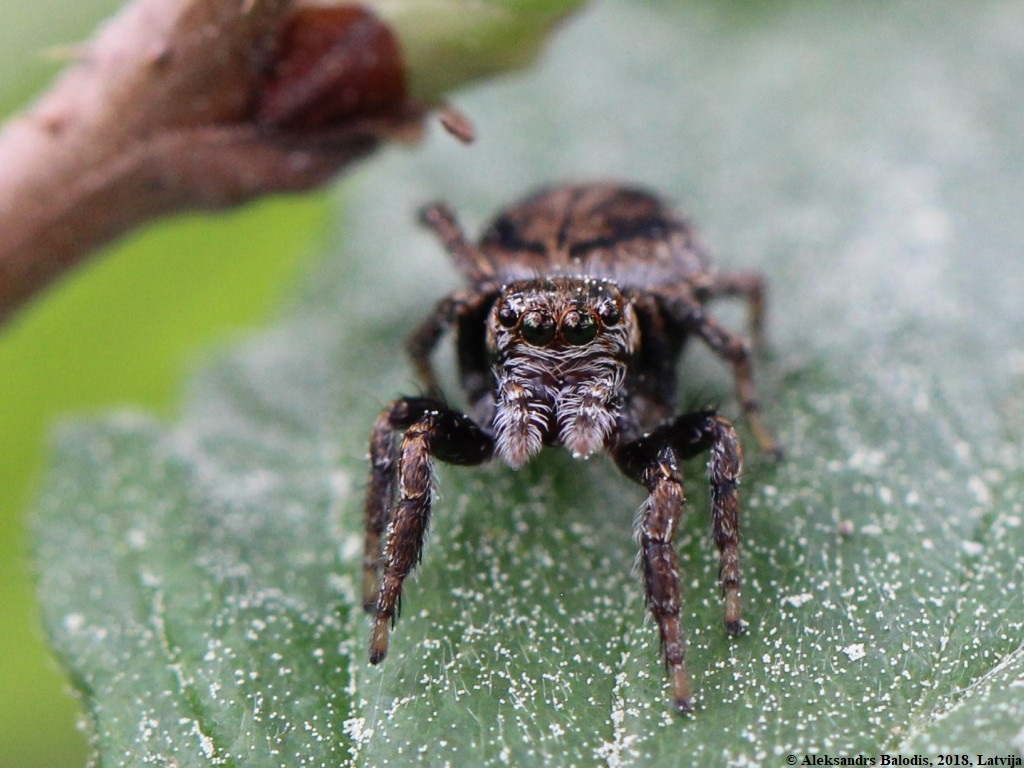
- The related Evarcha arcuata

Scientific classification
- Kingdom: Animalia
- Phylum: Arthropoda
- Subphylum: Chelicerata
- Class: Arachnida
- Order: Araneae
- Infraorder: Araneomorphae
- Family: Salticidae
- Genus: Evarcha
- Species: E. certa

Binomial name
- Evarcha certa Rollard & Wesołowska, 2002

= Evarcha certa =

Species of spider

Evarcha certa is a species of jumping spider in the genus Evarcha that lives in Guinea and Ethiopia. It thrives in grasslands, particularly near bodies of water like the Baro River and in areas of high altitude such as the Guinea Highlands. The species was first described in 2002 by Christine Rollard and Wanda Wesołowska. The spider is small, with a cephalothorax measuring between 2.6 and 2.9 mm (0.10 and 0.11 in) long and an abdomen that is between 2.7 and 3.4 mm (0.11 and 0.13 in) long. The cephalothorax has a reddish-brown topside, or carapace, with a darker eye field, and an orange underside, or sternum. The abdomen has a pattern consisting of irregular brown patches, although this differs between individual spiders. The spider has orange or yellow legs. It has distinctive copulatory organs. The female has relatively simple spermathecae that are heavily sclerotized and short insemination ducts. The male has not been described.

== Taxonomy ==
Evarcha certa is a species of jumping spider that was first described by Christine Rollard and Wanda Wesołowska in 2002. It was one of over 500 species identified by the Polish arachnologist Wesołowska during her career, making her one of the most prolific in the field. They allocated it to the genus Evarcha, first circumscribed by Eugène Simon in 1902. The genus is one of the largest, with members found on four continents. The species is named for a Latin word that can be translated "unquestionable" and recalls the relationship between this species and the genus Evarcha.

In 1976, Jerzy Prószyński placed the genus Evarcha in the subfamily Pelleninae, along with the genera Bianor and Pellenes. In Wayne Maddison's 2015 study of spider phylogenetic classification, the genus Evarcha was moved to the subtribe Plexippina. This is a member of the tribe Plexippini, in the subclade Simonida in the clade Saltafresia. It is closely related to the genera Hyllus and Plexippus. Analysis of protein-coding genes showed it was particularly related to Telamonia. In the following year, in 2016, Prószyński added the genus to a group of genera named Evarchines, named after the genus, along with Hasarinella and Nigorella based on similarities in the spiders' copulatory organs. He retained the species in Evarcha in his 2018 reclassification of the genus.

== Description ==
Evarcha certa is small with looks that are typical for the genus. The spider's body is divided into two main parts: an oval cephalothorax and an egg-shaped abdomen. The cephalothorax is between 2.6 and 2.9 mm (0.10 and 0.11 in) long and 2 and 2.4 mm (0.08 and 0.09 in) wide. The carapace, the hard upper part of the cephalothorax, is reddish-brown. It has a darker eye field is covered with a large number of greyish hairs. The area around the eyes themselves is black, some of which are encircled by small yellowish grey scales and long brown bristles. Some examples have yellow scales. The underside of the cephalothorax, or sternum, is orange. The spider's face, or clypeus, is high and light. Its mouthparts are distinctive. The chelicerae are light brown with two teeth to the front and a single tooth to the back. The light brown labium, with light tips, contrasts with the spider's orange maxillae.

The spider's abdomen is larger than its carapace, measuring between 2.7 and 3.4 mm (0.11 and 0.13 in) in length and having a width of between 1.9 and 2.5 mm (0.07 and 0.10 in). It is generally brownish-grey, although some examples are yellow. All have a brown pattern. Some have a number of indistinct design. Others have irregular brown patches, some of which are lighter and arrow shaped. Some examples have an abdominal pattern similar to the related Evarcha maculata. Others have light spots at the very back of the abdomen. All have an abdomen that is covered in brown or greyish hairs, interspersed with thick brown bristles. The underside is grey with a pattern of darker spots dotted across its surface and three darker lines that stretch down from towards the front to nearer to the back. The spider has yellow spinnerets to the front and grey to the back. Its legs are orange or yellow with a covering of brown hairs. The legs have brown spines.

The spider has a distinctive reproductive_system. The female has an oval epigyne that has rather heavy sclerotization. The copulatory openings are to the rear of the epigyne and lead to, initially, narrow, simple insemination ducts. The spermathecae, or receptacles, are also heavily sclerotized. They have thick walls and a simple design, consisting of a small number of chambers. The accessory glands are long. The relatively short length of the insemination ducts and simple design of the spermathecae help identify the species. The male has not been described.

== Behaviour ==
Jumping spiders do not spin webs to catch prey but rather hunt using their eyesight, which combines high depth perception, spatial definition that surpasses that of many vertebrates and the ability to operate in a range of light levels. Evarcha spiders often ambush their prey. The spiders will frequently live in nests constructed of webs. A study of the related Evarcha arcuata found that the spider will rest hanging from a silken thread.

== Distribution and habitat ==
Evarcha spiders live across the world, although those found in North America may be accidental migrants. Although the genus is found across Africa, Evarcha certa lives in Ethiopia and Guinea. The female holotype for the species was found in a meadow at an altitude of 1,200 m (3,900 ft) above sea level on Mount Tô in the Guinea Highlands in 1951. The first example to be found in Ethiopia was collected near the Baro River and Gambela, in the Illubabor Province, in 1985 at an altitude of 450 m (1,480 ft) above sea level. Others have been found across the country, including near Bishoftu and Wondo Genet.

The spider thrives in grasslands, particularly near water. It has been collected on grass on a rock face near Lake Ziway at an altitude of 1,900 m (6,200 ft) above sea level. Another specimen was found near Hawassa in lush grass near a stream at a height of 1,800 m (5,900 ft) above sea level. The spider seems to show a particular preference for meadows that include grasses of the genus Pennisetum.
