= Evarcha maculata =

Scientific classification
- Kingdom: Animalia
- Phylum: Arthropoda
- Subphylum: Chelicerata
- Class: Arachnida
- Order: Araneae
- Infraorder: Araneomorphae
- Family: Salticidae
- Genus: Evarcha
- Species: E. maculata

Binomial name
- Evarcha maculata Rollard & Wesołowska, 2002

Synonyms
- Evawes maculata (Rollard & Wesołowska, 2002)

Species of spider

Evarcha maculata is a species of jumping spider in the genus Evarcha that lives in Guinea, Ivory Coast and Ethiopia. It has been found in savanna in the Guinea Highlands and near bodies of water like the Awash River. The species was first described in 2002 by Christine Rollard and Wanda Wesołowska. The spider is small, with a cephalothorax measuring between 1.7 and 2.3 mm (0.07 and 0.09 in) long and an abdomen that is between 1.6 and 3.6 mm (0.06 and 0.14 in) long. The female is generally larger than the male, although there are exceptions, particularly amongst those found in Guinea. The cephalothorax has a yellowish topside, or carapace, with a darker eye field, and a yellow or yellowish-orange, or sternum. The abdomen has a distinctive pattern that is basically shaped like a capital "H", referred to in the species name, which can be translated "spotted". The spider has orange or yellow legs. It has distinctive copulatory organs. The female has distinctively shaped insemination ducts. The male has a very short curved embolus.

== Taxonomy and etymology ==
Evarcha maculata is a species of jumping spider, a member of the family Salticidae, that was first described by the arachnologists Christine Rollard and Wanda Wesołowska in 2002. Named for a Latin word that can be translated as "spotted" and recalls the pattern on the spider's abdomen, it was one of over 500 species identified by Wesołowska during her career, making her one of the most prolific in the field. They allocated it to the genus Evarcha, first circumscribed by Eugène Simon in 1902. The genus is one of the most speciose, with members found on four continents.

In 1976, Jerzy Prószyński placed the genus Evarcha in the subfamily Pelleninae, along with the genera Bianor and Pellenes. In Wayne Maddison's 2015 study of spider phylogenetic classification, the genus Evarcha was moved to the subtribe Plexippina. Plexippina is a member of the tribe Plexippini, which was listed in the subclade Simonida in the clade Saltafresia by Wayne Maddison in 2015. It is closely related to the genera Hyllus and Plexippus. Analysis of protein-coding genes showed it was particularly related to Telamonia. In 2016, Jerzy Prószyński added the genus to a group of genera named Evarchines, named after the genus, along with Hasarinella and Nigorella based on similarities in the spiders' copulatory organs.

Prószyński placed the spider in a new genus Evawes in 2018 based on its copulatory organs and the way that they differ from other Evarcha spiders. The new genus name is a combination of Evacha and Wesołowska. This designation is not widely accepted and the species remains in the Evarcha genus in the World Spider Catalog.

== Description ==
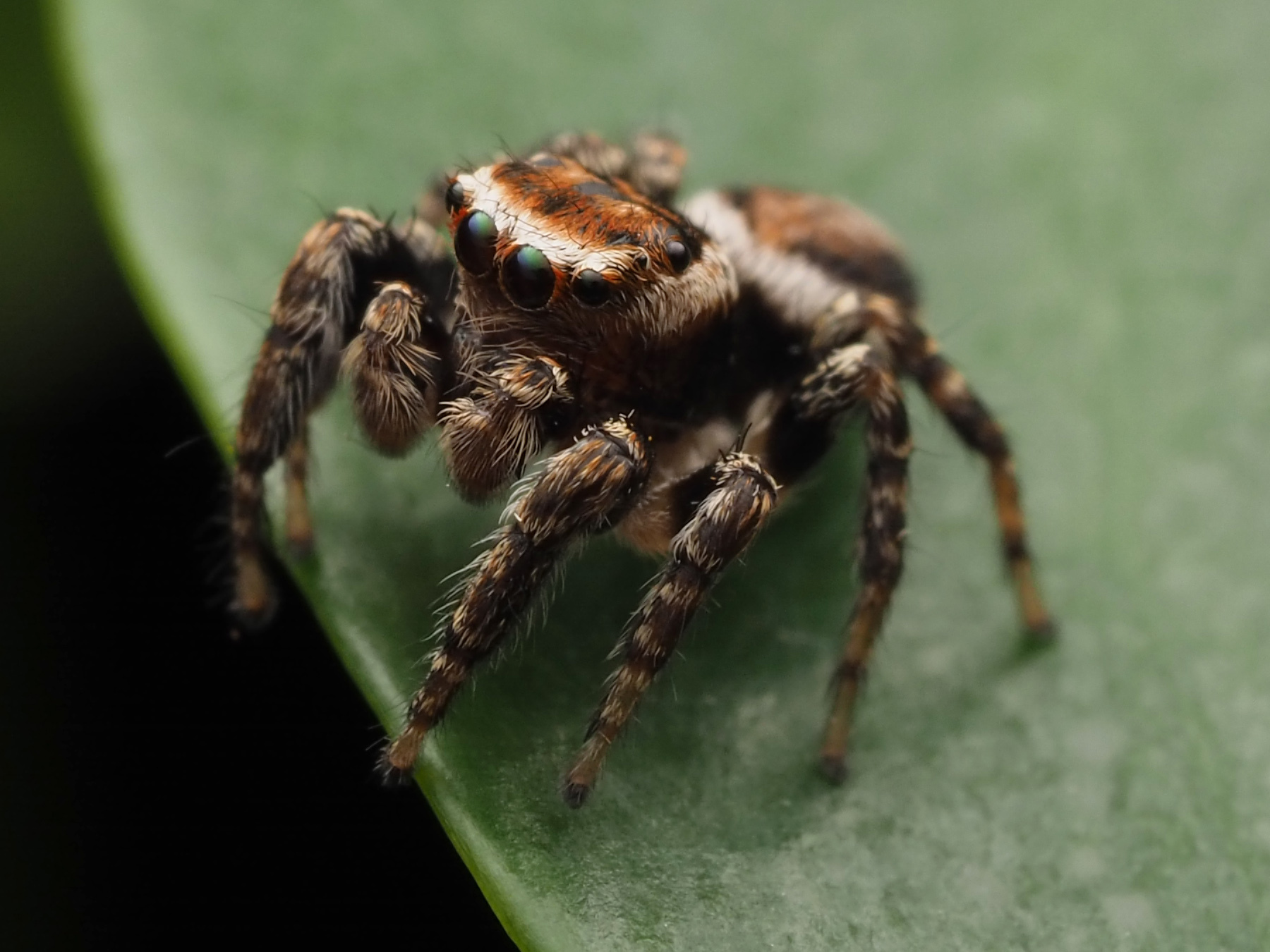
The related Evarcha hoyi

Evarcha maculata is a small, light-coloured spider with looks that are typical for the genus. The spider's body is divided into two main parts: an ovoid cephalothorax and an oval abdomen. The male has a cephalothorax that is between 1.7 and 2.1 mm (0.07 and 0.08 in) long and 1.4 and 1.5 mm (0.06 and 0.06 in) wide. The carapace, the hard upper part of the cephalothorax, is yellowish and marked with grey lines along its edges and an indistinct brown stripy pattern on the top. It has a darker eye field with white patches and black areas around the eyes themselves, some with small yellowish scales. Tiny white hairs cover the whole surface. The underside of the cephalothorax, or sternum, is yellow or yellowish-orange. The spider's face, or clypeus, is relatively low and has a covering of white hairs that is particularly dense around its cheeks. Its mouthparts are distinctive, with the brown or light brown chelicerae having darker spots while the labium is yellow or brown and the maxillae are orange-yellow.

The male spider's abdomen is similar in size to its carapace, measuring between 1.6 and 1.9 mm (0.07 in) in length and having a width of between 1 and 1.2 mm (0.04 and 0.05 in). The top is generally yellowish with a greyish-brown pattern that looks similar to a large capital "H", and a covering of white and brown hairs. Some examples of the related Evarcha certa have a similar pattern. The very front edge has very long dark bristles. The underside is generally yellow, although in some examples it is more grey to the sides, with a brown or grey stripe down the middle. The spider has greyish or brown spinnerets. Its legs are generally yellow, although there are darker rings on some of the segments, with a covering of brown and grey hairs. The legs have brown spines.

The spider has distinctive copulatory organs. The male's pedipalp is brownish with dense hairs on the cymbium that forms the main outer cover for the palpal bulb. The palpal bulb is bulgy, with a large bulbous protrusion at its base and rounded sides. From the top projects an embolus that is short and sharp. It is the embolus that enables the male to inseminate the female. Attached to the base of the bulb, the palpal tibia is also hairy and has a large straight protrusion, or tibial apophysis, that also has a sharp end. The simple nature of the tibial apophysis contrasts with the more complex design on the otherwise similar Evarcha mirabilis. Its curved embolus helps distinguish it from the related Evarcha vittula.

The female is larger than the male, with a cephalothorax that is between 2.1 and 2.3 mm (0.09 in) long and 1.6 and 1.9 mm wide and an abdomen between 2.6 and 3.6 mm (0.10 and 0.14 in) long and 1.8 and 2.7 mm (0.07 and 0.11 in) wide, although one example from Guinea was smaller, with a carapace and abdomen only 1.8 mm long. The female is also darker than the male. It has a high carapace with a sloping back that is generally brownish-orange and covered in brown hairs, with a short dark eye field. There are long bristles, translucent scales and black rings around its eyes. The sternum is yellowish-orange to light brown. The labium is similarly yellowish-orange to light brown while the clypeus is universally light brown. There is a single tooth in the chelicerae, which are light brown with darker patches.

The female abdomen has the same pattern as the male on top, but lighter and less distinct. In some examples, the pattern is closer in shape to an arrow. It is covered in short hairs. The underside is greyish with dots forming three lines. The spinnerets are yellowish-grey and the legs yellowish-orange to light brown. The last pair of legs are longer than the others. They are covered in brown hairs. Its external genital structure, or epigyne, is sclerotized and has a shallow depression in the middle and two pockets to the rear near the epigastric furrow. There are two copulatory openings that lead to thick-walled insemination ducts. The ducts are complex, as are the spermathecae, or receptacles, at their end, which have many chambers. It is the course of the ducts that most easily distinguishes it from the females of other Evarcha species.

== Behaviour and habitat ==
Evarcha maculata lives in savanna on mountains. Ethiopian examples have been found living in riverine forests, including those around the Awash River. They will often be found in leaf litter and seem to be particularly partial to trees like Vachellia nilotica. Evarcha spiders will often live in nests constructed of webs amongst the trees. A study of the related Evarcha arcuata found that the spider will rest hanging from a silken thread. It will eat a wide range of food, including aphids, flies and other spiders. Like other jumping spiders, they do not spin webs to catch their prey but instead hunt by ambushing.

== Distribution ==
Evarcha spiders live across the world, although those found in North America may be accidental migrants. The genus is found across Africa. Evarcha maculata lives in Ethiopia, Ivory Coast and Guinea. The holotype was discovered in 1991 on Mount Leclerc, one of the Nimba Range in the Guinea Highlands, at an altitude of 900 m (3,000 ft) above sea level. Other examples were found at the same location. The first identified member of the species from Ethiopia was described in 2008. It had been found in the Awash National Park at an altitude of 800 m (2,600 ft) above sea level in 1983. Other examples have also been found in the local area. Its presence in Ivory Coast was first recorded in 2022 based on a specimen collected from Lamto in Bandama Forest in 1975.
