= Nigorella aethiopica =

Scientific classification
- Kingdom: Animalia
- Phylum: Arthropoda
- Subphylum: Chelicerata
- Class: Arachnida
- Order: Araneae
- Infraorder: Araneomorphae
- Family: Salticidae
- Genus: Nigorella
- Species: N. aethiopica

Binomial name
- Nigorella aethiopica Wesołowska & Tomasiewicz, 2008

Species of spider

Nigorella aethiopica is the type species of the genus Nigorella. A jumping spider that lives in Ethiopia and named in honour of the country in which it is found, it was first described in 2008 by Wanda Wesołowska and Beata Tomasiewicz. The spider is larger than others in the species with a cephalothorax that is between 4.1 and 4.8 mm (0.16 and 0.19 in) long and an abdomen that is between 4.3 and 5.6 mm (0.17 and 0.22 in) long. The carapace is generally brown and hairy, although the male is darker. While the male abdomen is marked by a light stripe on the topside and dots underneath, the female abdomen has a pattern of a light stripe and patches on the top and dark stripes on the bottom. As well as its larger size, the species can be distinguished by its copulatory organs. The split at the end of the appendage on the pedipalp tibia marks out the male, and the female has longer seminal ducts and thinner spermathecae than others in the genus.

== Taxonomy and etymology ==
Nigorella aethiopica is a species of jumping spider, a member of the family Salticidae, that was first described by the arachnologists Wanda Wesołowska and Beata Tomasiewicz in 2008. It is one of over 500 species identified by Wesołowska. They allocated is to the genus Nigorella, raised by Wesołowska and Tomasiewicz at the same time. They described the genus name as an arbitrary arrangement of letters. The species is named after Ethiopia, the country where it was first found.

Medium-sized to large, the spiders resemble Hyllus, but differ in the design of the copulatory organs of both sexes. In 2015, Wayne Maddison listed the genus in the subtribe Plexippina in the tribe Plexippini. Previously termed Plexippeae, by Eugène Simon in 1901, and identified as a subfamily, the tribe is part of the clade Saltafresia. In 2017, the genus was grouped with seven other genera of jumping spiders under the name Evarchines, named after the genus Evarcha, by Jerzy Prószyński. Nigorella aethiopica was designated the type species for the genus.

== Description ==
Nigorella aethiopica is large spider, the largest in the genus, with a total length of about 10 mm (0.39 in). It has a body that is divided into two main parts: a rectangular cephalothorax and a thinner, more rounded abdomen. The male's cephalothorax that is typically between 4.1 and 4.8 mm (0.16 and 0.19 in) long and 2.8 and 3.5 mm (0.11 and 0.14 in) wide. The carapace, the hard upper shell of the cephalothorax, is oval and of medium height with a gently sloping back section. It is dark coloured and covered in short brown hairs. The eye field is short and black with long bristles near to eyes themselves. The spider's clypeus is low and dark. The mouthparts are generally brown, with white ends to the labium and maxillae. The chelicerae are bulky, very dark and unidentate.

The male abdomen is similar in size to the carapace, between 4.3 and 5 mm (0.17 and 0.20 in) long and between 2.3 and 3 mm (0.091 and 0.118 in) wide. It is a dark brown oval that is also covered in dark brown hairs. There is a light stripe down the middle of the topside and four rows of dots on the underside. The spinnerets are dark and the legs are generally dark brown, although some sections are reddish, with long brown hairs.

The spider has distinctive copulatory organs. The male has dark pedipalps, apart from the very tip of the cymbium. Its cymbium is hairy and rounded. The palpal bulb is also rounded, is wider than the cymbium but shorter, and slightly heart-shaped. There is a small projection, or apophysis, that surrounds the embolus. The palpal tibia has a wide boat-shaped apophysis that has a notch on the end. The tibial apophysis has a curve that follows the palpal bulb.

The female is similar in shape to the male but lighter in colour and less hairy. It has a cephalothorax that is typically 4.7 mm (0.19 in) in length and 3.4 mm (0.13 in) in width and an abdomen that measures typically 5.6 mm (0.22 in) in length and between 3.4 mm (0.13 in) in width. The carapace is lighter brown with a lighter stripe, and there are traces of two streaks on the eye field. Its chelicerae are similar to the male while the clypeus has small white hairs. There is a pattern consisting of a light stripe towards the front of the top of the abdomen and eight patches in pairs to the back. The underside has three dark stripes across the lighter middle, with darker areas towards the edges. The legs are also lighter, with lighter hairs, and the pedipalps are more yellow.

The female copulatory organs are also distinctive. The epigyne, the external part of the copulatory organs, is short, wide. It is marked by two widely-separated and heavily sclerotised copulatory openings and two pockets. The species shares the sclerotised cup-like areas which hide the gonopores in the epigyne that helps to distinguish Nigorella spiders. The openings lead, via relatively long insemination ducts to large spermathecae, or receptacles.

As well as its larger size, the species can be differentiated from others in the genus by its copulatory organs. The split in the tip of the tibial apophysis helps distinguish the male while the female can be identified by its longer seminal ducts and slimmer spermathecae. The species is very similar in appearance to the smaller Nigorella plebeja and can be confused with it. However, the other species has a single tip to the male tibial apophysis and the female has strong sclerotisation on the first parts of the insemination ducts.

== Distribution ==
Nigorella spiders live in Africa. Nigorella aethiopica is endemic to Ethiopia. The holotype was discovered in 1986 in the Awash National Park. Its species distribution is the furthest east of any spider in the genus.
