= Cembalea =

Scientific classification
- Kingdom: Animalia
- Phylum: Arthropoda
- Subphylum: Chelicerata
- Class: Arachnida
- Order: Araneae
- Infraorder: Araneomorphae
- Family: Salticidae
- Subfamily: Salticinae
- Genus: Cembalea; Wesolowska, 1993

Type species
- C. pulmosa (Lessert, 1925)

Species
- 5, see text

Genus of spiders

Cembalea is a genus of African jumping spiders that was first described by Wanda Wesołowska in 1993.

== Life style ==
Apparently Cembalea is an exclusively ground-dwelling genus.

== Description ==
These are small spiders with a large eye field. The members of the genus have a high carapace. The first legs of males have long, bushy setae on ventral surface of the femora, with similar setae and scale-like hairs on the ventral surface of the metatarsi.

This genus is characterized by the structure of the pedipalp and epigyne. A characteristic feature of males is the long embolus that easily breaks off in preserved specimens and is sometimes missing as a result.

== Species ==
As of October 2025, this genus includes five species:

- Cembalea affinis Rollard & Wesołowska, 2002 – Guinea
- Cembalea heteropogon (Simon, 1910) – Namibia, South Africa
- Cembalea hirsuta Wesołowska, 2011 – Namibia
- Cembalea plumosa (Lessert, 1925) – Kenya, Tanzania, Mozambique, South Africa (type species)
- Cembalea triloris Haddad & Wesołowska, 2011 – Namibia, South Africa
