= Cembalea heteropogon =

Namibia Cembalea Jumping Spider

Scientific classification
- Kingdom: Animalia
- Phylum: Arthropoda
- Subphylum: Chelicerata
- Class: Arachnida
- Order: Araneae
- Infraorder: Araneomorphae
- Family: Salticidae
- Genus: Cembalea
- Species: C. heteropogon

Binomial name
- Cembalea heteropogon (Simon, 1910)

Synonyms
- Neaetha heteropogon Simon, 1910; Naetha heteropogon Próchniewicz, 1989

Species of spider

Cembalea heteropogon is a species of spider in the family Salticidae. It is found in southern Africa and is commonly known as the Namibia Cembalea jumping spider.

== Distribution ==
Cembalea heteropogon is found in Namibia and South Africa. In South Africa, it is recorded from the Northern Cape Province.

== Habitat and ecology ==
C. heteropogon are free-living ground-dwellers. They have been sampled from pistachio orchards in the Nama Karoo Biome at altitudes ranging from 95 to 950 m. Specimens sampled in the Desert Biome were collected from under rocks and in leaf litter.

== Taxonomy ==
Cembalea heteropogon was originally described in 1910 as Neaetha heteropogon from Possession Island, Namibia. It was transferred to Cembalea by Logunov in 1996 and redescribed by Wesołowska in 2006.

== Conservation ==
Cembalea heteropogon is listed as Least Concern due to its wide geographical range. In South Africa, it is protected in the Richtersveld Transfrontier National Park. There are no significant threats to the species.
