= Cembalea plumosa =

Tanzania Cembalea Jumping Spider

Scientific classification
- Kingdom: Animalia
- Phylum: Arthropoda
- Subphylum: Chelicerata
- Class: Arachnida
- Order: Araneae
- Infraorder: Araneomorphae
- Family: Salticidae
- Genus: Cembalea
- Species: C. plumosa

Binomial name
- Cembalea plumosa (Lessert, 1925)

Synonyms
- Neaetha heteropogon Simon, 1910; Tularosa plumosa Lessert, 1925

Species of spider

Cembalea plumosa is a species of spider in the family Salticidae. It is found in Africa and is commonly known as the Tanzania Cembalea jumping spider.

== Distribution ==
Cembalea plumosa is found in Kenya, Tanzania, Mozambique and South Africa. The specific distribution within South Africa is unknown.

== Habitat and ecology ==
These are free-living ground-dwellers.

== Taxonomy ==
Cembalea plumosa was originally described in 1925 as Tularosa plumosa from Tanzania. It was transferred to Cembalea by Wesołowska in 1993.

== Conservation ==
Cembalea plumosa is listed as Least Concern due to its wide geographical range in Africa. There are no significant threats to the species.
