= Nigorella manica =

Scientific classification
- Kingdom: Animalia
- Phylum: Arthropoda
- Subphylum: Chelicerata
- Class: Arachnida
- Order: Araneae
- Infraorder: Araneomorphae
- Family: Salticidae
- Genus: Nigorella
- Species: N. manica

Binomial name
- Nigorella manica (Peckham & Peckham, 1903)

Synonyms
- Philaeus manicus Peckham & Peckham, 1903

Species of spider

Nigorella manica is a species of spider in the family Salticidae, found in Zimbabwe.

== Taxonomy ==
The species was first described in 1903 by George and Elizabeth Peckham under the name Philaeus manicus. In 1927, R. de Lessert considered it the same species as Pachypoessa albimana, described earlier by Eugène Simon in 1902. This synonymization was rejected by Wanda Wesołowska and Beata Tomasiewicz in 2008 and 2009. Both species are now placed in the genus Nigorella, as N. manica and N. albimana.
