= Cembalea affinis =

Scientific classification
- Kingdom: Animalia
- Phylum: Arthropoda
- Subphylum: Chelicerata
- Class: Arachnida
- Order: Araneae
- Infraorder: Araneomorphae
- Family: Salticidae
- Genus: Cembalea
- Species: C. affinis

Binomial name
- Cembalea affinis Rollard & Wesołowska, 2002

Species of spider

Cembalea affinis is a species of jumping spider in the genus Cembalea that lives in Guinea. It was first described in 2002 by Christine Rollard and Wanda Wesołowska. It is very similar to the closely related species Cembalea pulmosa, and its name recalls the strong relationship between the two species. However, it can be distinguished from other spdiers, including Cembalea pulmosa, by its long thin whip-like embolus. The spider is small and brown, with a carapace that is typically 2.3 mm (0.091 in) long and an abdomen that is typically 1.9 mm (0.075 in) long. The dark brown chelicerae have two teeth at the front and one at the rear. It has a large eye field, which is typical for the genus, and a row of very long dark hairs on the cymbium.

== Taxonomy ==
Cembalea affinis is a species of jumping spider that was first described by Christine Rollard and Wanda Wesołowska in 2002. It is one of over 500 species identified by the Polish arachnologist. It was allocated to the genus Cembalea, which had been created by Wesołowska in 1993. The species name is derived from the Latin word meaning related. The genus was placed in the subtribe Thiratoscirtina in the tribe Aelurillini by Wayne Maddison in 2015. It was allocated to the subclade Simonida in the clade Simonida, both named in honour of the French arachnologist Eugène Simon. The genus is distinguished from its relatives by the way that the embolus looks disconnected from the tegulum. In his 2017 study, Jerzy Prószyński placed the genus in a group called Hyllines.

== Description ==
Cembalea affinis is a small spider with a large eye field typical of the genus. Only the male has been described. It is very similar to the related Cembalea pulumosa, a feature that is reflected in the species name. It has a carapace that has a typical length of 2.3 mm (0.091 in) and width of 1.6 mm (0.063 in). The abdomen is typically 1.9 mm (0.075 in) long and 1.0 mm (0.039 in) wide. The high and curved carapace is brown and brown hairs cover much of the body. The eye field is black. The abdomen is elongated and a lighter brown in colour, with a wide lighter stripe. The clypeus is low and covered in white hairs. The chelicerae are dark brown with two teeth at the front and a single tooth at the back. The spinnerets are light and the legs are yellow and hairy. The pedipalps are also yellow and have a row of very long dark hairs on the cymbium. The embolus is very long, whip-like and loops around the palpal bulb. The spider is distinguished from other members of the genus by its long embolus.

== Distribution and habitat ==
Cembalea affinis is endemic to Guinea. The male holotype was found in 1991. It is ground-dwelling.
