= Cembalea triloris =

Northern Cape Cembalea Jumping Spider

Scientific classification
- Kingdom: Animalia
- Phylum: Arthropoda
- Subphylum: Chelicerata
- Class: Arachnida
- Order: Araneae
- Infraorder: Araneomorphae
- Family: Salticidae
- Genus: Cembalea
- Species: C. triloris

Binomial name
- Cembalea triloris Wesołowska & Haddad, 2011

Species of spider

Cembalea triloris is a species of jumping spider in the genus Cembalea that lives in Namibia and South Africa. It was first described in 2011 by Wanda Wesołowska and Charles Haddad. The spider gets its name from the existence of three distinctive white stripes on its back, more noticeable on the male. The spider is small, with a dark brown carapace that is between 2 and 2.3 mm (0.079 and 0.091 in) long and a lighter sandy or yellowish-white abdomen that is between 2.4 and 2.6 mm (0.094 and 0.102 in) long. It has a large eye field and a clypeus that extends to the edge of the carapace. It can also be distinguished from other members of the genus by the large spike that protrudes from the abdomen and the male's long embolus.

== Taxonomy ==
Cembalea triloris is a species of jumping spider, a member of the family Salticidae, that was first described by the arachnologists Wanda Wesołowska and Charles Haddad in 2011. It is one of over 500 species identified by Wesołowska. It was placed in the genus Cembalea, which had been first described by Wesołowska in 1993. The species name derives from two Latin words meaning three and strap, and relate to the markings on the carapace, the hard upper shell on the spider. The genus was placed in the subtribe Thiratoscirtina in the tribe Aelurillini by Wayne Maddison in 2015. It was allocated to the subclade Simonida in the clade Simonida, both named in honour of the French arachnologist Eugène Simon. They are distinguished by the way that the embolus looks disconnected from the tegulum. In his 2017 study, Jerzy Prószyński placed the genus in a group of genera called Hyllines.

== Description ==
Cembalea triloris is a small spider with a large eye field. The female has a cephalothorax that is between 2.1 and 2.2 mm (0.083 and 0.087 in) long and 1.6 and 1.8 mm (0.063 and 0.071 in) wide. The dark brown carapace is high and curved, with three wide white stripes formed of hairs, one of which is more distinctive. The clypeus is hairy and stretches to the sides of the carapace. The chelicerae are light brown. The abdomen is between 2.4 and 2.6 mm (0.094 and 0.102 in) long and 1.6 and 1.8 mm (0.063 and 0.071 in) wide, sandy in colour and covered in light hairs, with a faint pattern of chevrons and diagonal lines barely visible on the surface. The spider's spinnerets are dark grey and long and its legs are yellow and spiny. The epigyne has a large central cavity that connects to a deep pocket. The seminal ducts are long.

The male has a carapace that measures between 2 and 2.3 mm (0.079 and 0.091 in) in length and 1.6 and 1.8 mm (0.063 and 0.071 in) in width and an abdomen that is between 19 and 2.5 mm (0.748 and 0.098 in) in length and 1.4 and 1.7 mm (0.055 and 0.067 in) in width. The three stripes on the carapace are clearer to see. The abdomen is lighter, a yellowish white, with a large brown stripe down the middle. The back of the spider has a distinctive spike. The clypeus, chelicerae and spinnerets are similar, although darker in hue, to the female. There is a single tooth in the chelicerae. The pedipalps are pale. The palpal bulbs have long appendages and an embolus that is also long. As well as the distinctive marking after which it is named, The spider is distinguished from other members of the genus by the long spike, as well as its long embolus.

== Distribution and habitat ==
Cembalea triloris lives in Namibia and South Africa. The male holotype was collected near Prieska in the Northern Cape of South Africa in 2002. It was originally misidentified as a member of the Pellenes genus.. The first female was found outside Keetmanshoop, Namibia in 2002. It has also been observed in the Tswalu Kalahari Reserve. Other specimens were also discovered in other areas of the Northern Cape and Namibia. It lives on the ground.
