= Cembalea hirsuta =

Scientific classification
- Kingdom: Animalia
- Phylum: Arthropoda
- Subphylum: Chelicerata
- Class: Arachnida
- Order: Araneae
- Infraorder: Araneomorphae
- Family: Salticidae
- Genus: Cembalea
- Species: C. hirsuta

Binomial name
- Cembalea hirsuta Wesołowska, 2011

Species of spider

Cembalea hirsuta is a species of jumping spider that lives in Namibia. It was first described in 2011 by Wanda Wesołowska. Only the male has been identified. The spider is small, with a brown cephalothorax that is between 2.5 and 2.6 mm (0.098 and 0.102 in) long and an abdomen that is between 2.4 and 2.7 mm (0.094 and 0.106 in) long and may either be grey or brown. The abdomen can have a range of different patterns, including white spots or a single brown stripe. The spider's large eye field is typical for the genus. It has very hairy pedipalps and a long embolus that curls around the palpal bulb, which enables it to be distinguished from other spiders.

== Taxonomy ==
Cembalea hirsuta is a jumping spider that was first described by Wanda Wesołowska in 2011. It is one of over 500 species identified by the Polish arachnologist during her career. It was placed in the genus Cembalea, which had been first described by Wesołowska in 1993. The species name recalls the very hairy pedipalps. The genus was placed in the subtribe Thiratoscirtina in the tribe Aelurillini by Wayne Maddison in 2015. It was allocated to the subclade Simonida in the clade Simonida, both named in honour of the French arachnologist Eugène Simon. They can be distinguished from other members of the tribe by the way that the embolus looks disconnected from the tegulum. In his 2017 study, Jerzy Prószyński placed the genus in a group called Hyllines.

== Description ==
Cembalea hirsuta is a small spider. Only the male has been described. It has a cephalothorax that is between 2.5 and 2.6 mm (0.098 and 0.102 in) long and 1.9 and 2.0 mm (0.075 and 0.079 in) wide. The abdomen is between 2.4 and 2.7 mm (0.094 and 0.106 in) long and 1.6 and 1.8 mm (0.063 and 0.071 in) wide. The high and curved carapace is brown and hairy with a streak down the middle made of white hairs. The eye field is large and a darker brown. The abdomen is oval and has differing designs, ranging from have a pattern of white patches on a dark brown shell to being predominantly grey with a single brown stripe down the middle. The clypeus is also brown and hairy. The chelicerae are dark brown. The spinnerets are grey and hairy. The legs are orange, the first pair being slightly darker, and have dark hairs. The pedipalps are light brown and have long hairs which are both brown and white. There is a spike on the palpal bulbs, which also have a distinctive convex feature. The embolus is very long, and goes around the bulb. The cymbium is also long.

The large eye field is typical of the genus. However, the wide range of different abdominal patterns makes the spider hard to identify. It is the design of the copulatory organs that separates the species from other members of the genus. Specifically, the spider can be distinguished by its long embolus.

== Distribution and habitat ==
Cembalea hirsuta is endemic to Namibia. It lives in the western side of the country. The male holotype was collected near Swakopmund in 1988, and examples have also been found in other areas of Walvis Bay.
