= Denisiphantes =

Scientific classification
- Kingdom: Animalia
- Phylum: Arthropoda
- Subphylum: Chelicerata
- Class: Arachnida
- Order: Araneae
- Infraorder: Araneomorphae
- Family: Linyphiidae
- Genus: Denisiphantes; Tu, Li & Rollard, 2005

Species
- Denisiphantes arcuatus Zhou, Irfan & Peng, 2021 – China; Denisiphantes denisi (Schenkel, 1963 – China

Genus of spiders

Denisiphantes is a genus of East Asian dwarf spiders containing two species, Denisiphantes denisi and the recently described Denisiphantes arcuatus. The genus was first described by L. H. Tu, S. Q. Li & C. Rollard in 2005, with both species occurring in China.
