= Nigorella albimana =

Scientific classification
- Kingdom: Animalia
- Phylum: Arthropoda
- Subphylum: Chelicerata
- Class: Arachnida
- Order: Araneae
- Infraorder: Araneomorphae
- Family: Salticidae
- Genus: Nigorella
- Species: N. albimana

Binomial name
- Nigorella albimana (Simon, 1902)

Synonyms
- Pachypoessa albimana Simon, 1902; Philaeus manicus Peckham & Peckham, 1903; Pachypoessa plebeja (L. Koch, 1875) (nomen dubium)

Species of spider

Nigorella albimana is a species of spider in the family Salticidae (jumping spiders), found in west and central Africa.

== Taxonomy ==
The species was first described as Pachypoessa albimana by Eugène Simon in 1902. In 1927, R. de Lessert considered Philaeus manicus to be the same species, making it a junior synonym of Pachypoessa albimana. In 1987, Jerzy Prószyński further synonymized Pachypoessa albimana with Euophrys plebeja. As this was the older name, the species became Pachypoessa plebeja. Both synonymizations are now rejected. Philaeus manicus is treated as a separate species in the genus Nigorella, N. manica. Euophrys plebeja is regarded as a doubtful name (nomen dubium).
