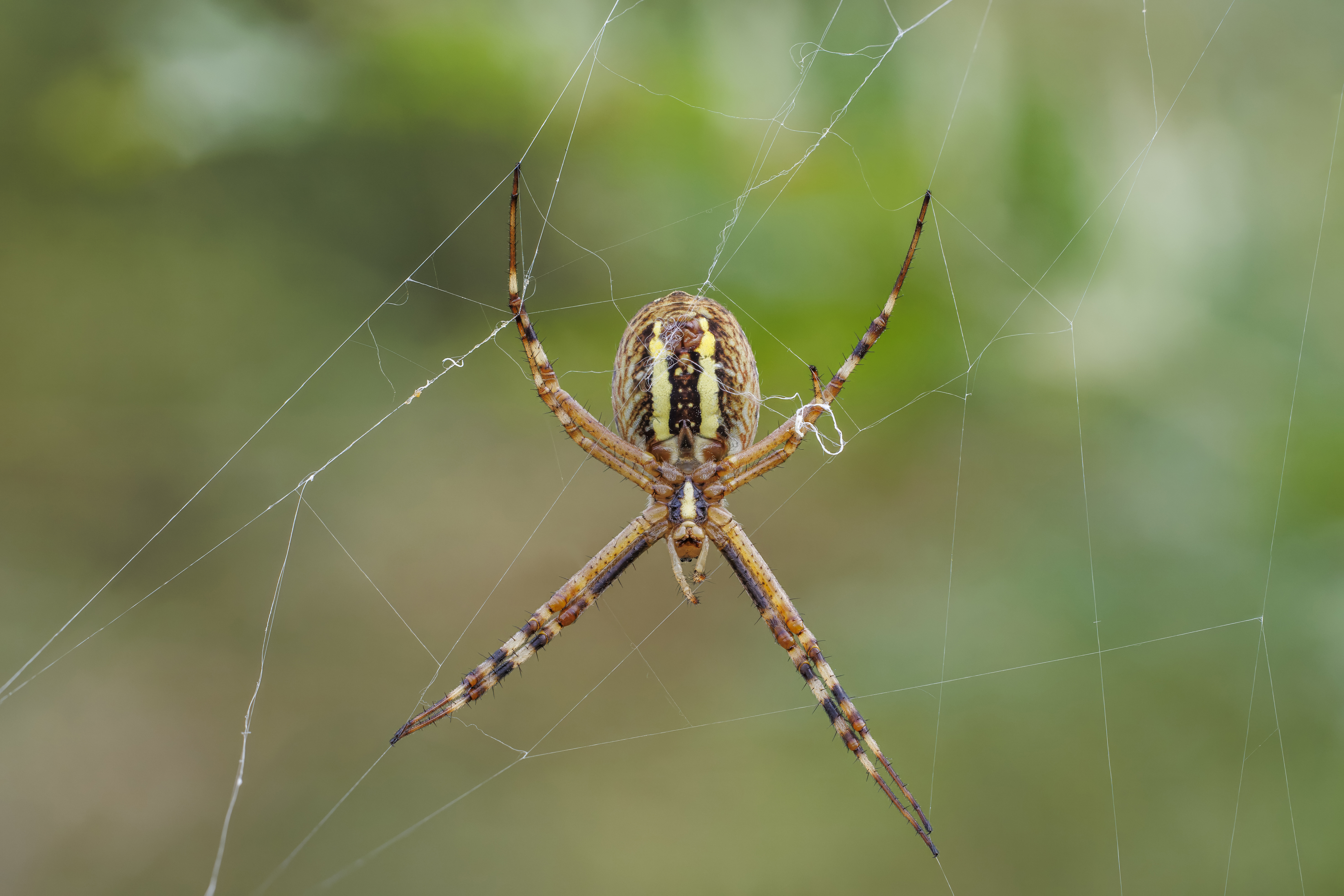
- Female, ventral side
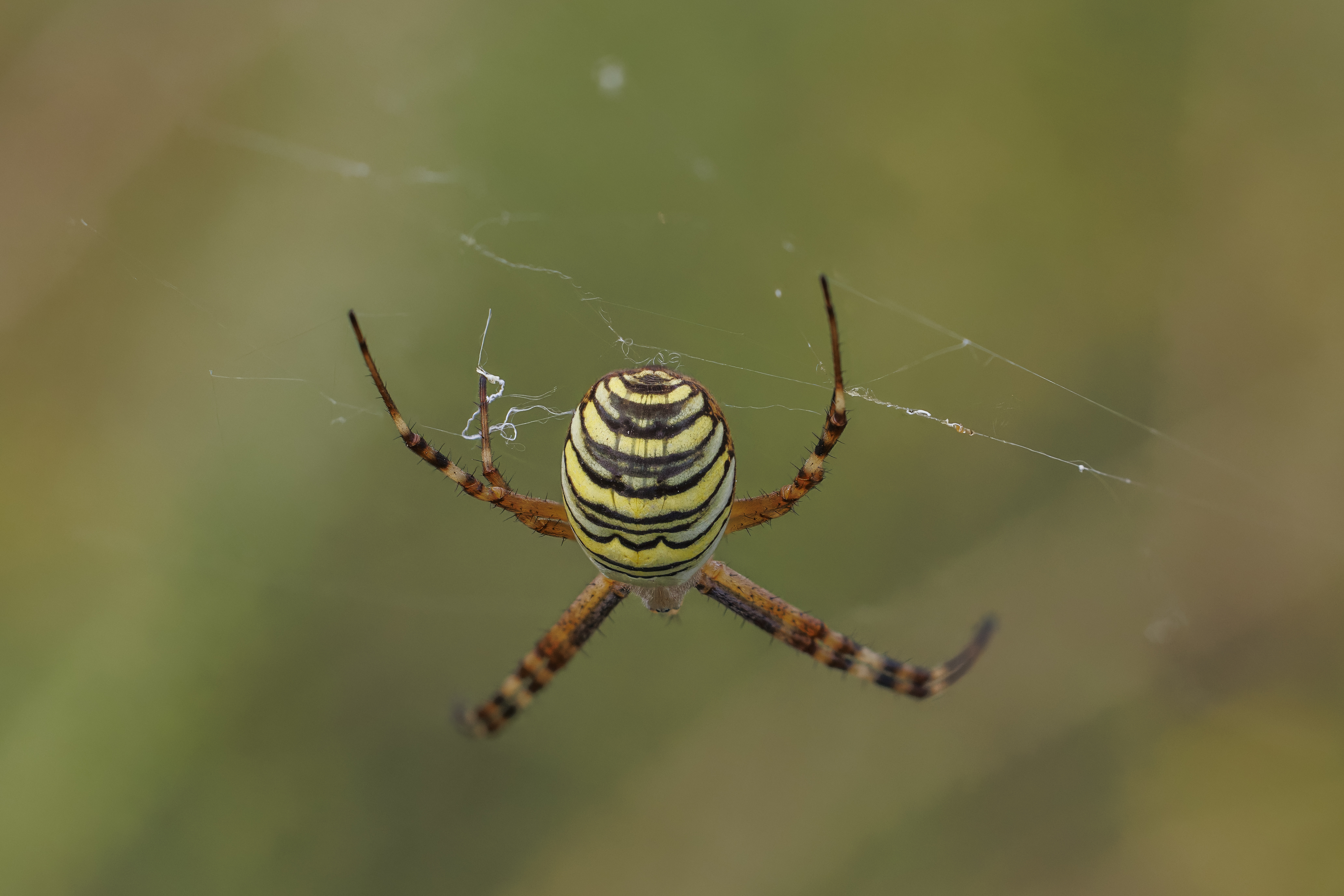
- Female, dorsal side

Scientific classification
- Kingdom: Animalia
- Phylum: Arthropoda
- Subphylum: Chelicerata
- Class: Arachnida
- Order: Araneae
- Infraorder: Araneomorphae
- Family: Araneidae
- Genus: Argiope
- Species: A. bruennichi

Binomial name
- Argiope bruennichi (Scopoli, 1772)

Synonyms
- List: Argiope acuminata Franganillo, 1920; Aranea brünnichii; Aranea speciosa; Aranea fasciata; Aranea zebra; Aranea formosa; Aranea pulchra; Aranea caspia; Aranea phragmitis; Segestria pulchra; Miranda transalpina; Epeira speciosa; Nephila transalpina; Epeira fasciata; Nephila fasciata; Miranda zabonica; Argiope brünnichi; Argiope bruennichii

= Argiope bruennichi =

Species of orb-weaver spider

Argiope bruennichi, commonly known as the wasp spider, is a species of orb-weaver spider found across Central and Northern Europe, several regions of Asia and Africa and the Azores. Like many other members of the same genus Argiope, this species has distinctive yellow, white and black markings on its abdomen.

== Description ==
Argiope bruennichi exhibit sexual dimorphism. The adult males average a length of approximately 4.5 mm while the adult females reach a body length of 14 - 20 mm. The small size of the male spiders allows them to enter into a female's web undetected in order to mate; a major fitness advantage.

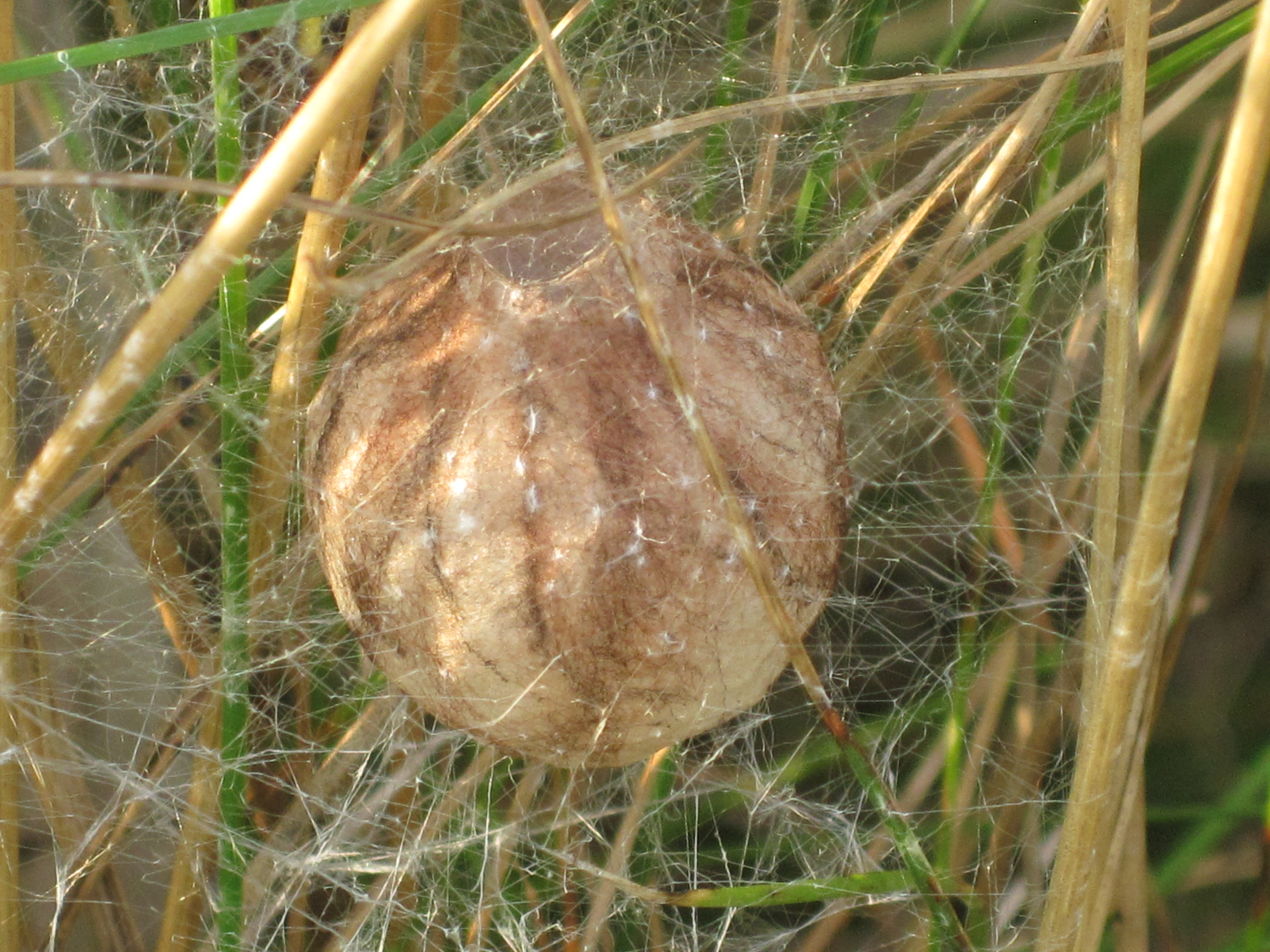
Egg sac

== Web ==
The spider builds a spiral orb web at dawn or dusk, most often in long grass just above ground level. The zigzag-shaped web decoration, named the stabilimentum, is featured at the centre of the orb. Its function is not currently known, though studies have indicated that the webs containing stabilimentia are damaged less often by birds flying through them.

When prey gets trapped in the web, the spider immobilizes it by wrapping it in silk. The prey is then bitten and injected with a paralyzing venom and a protein-dissolving enzyme.

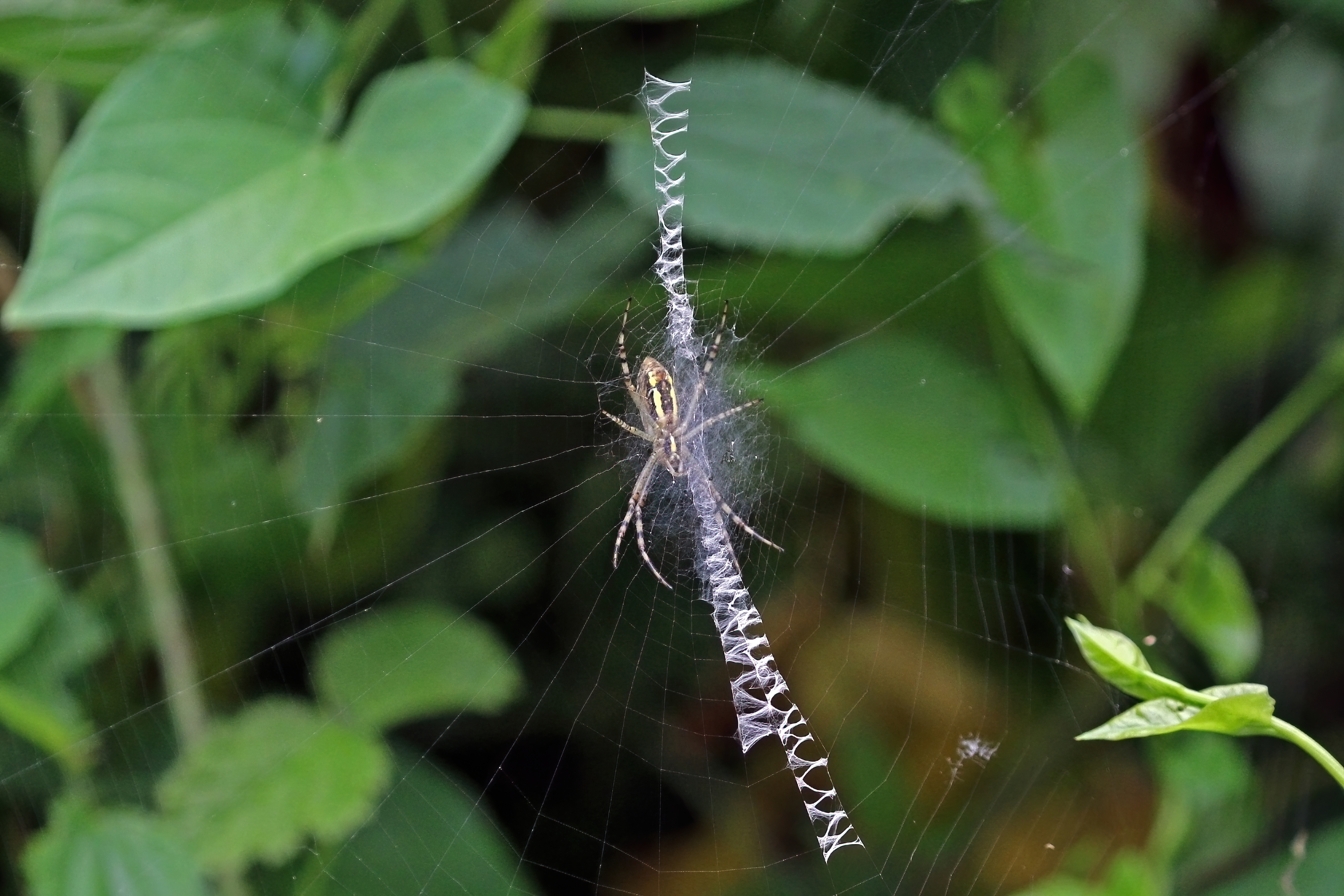
Female on web, showing stabilimentum

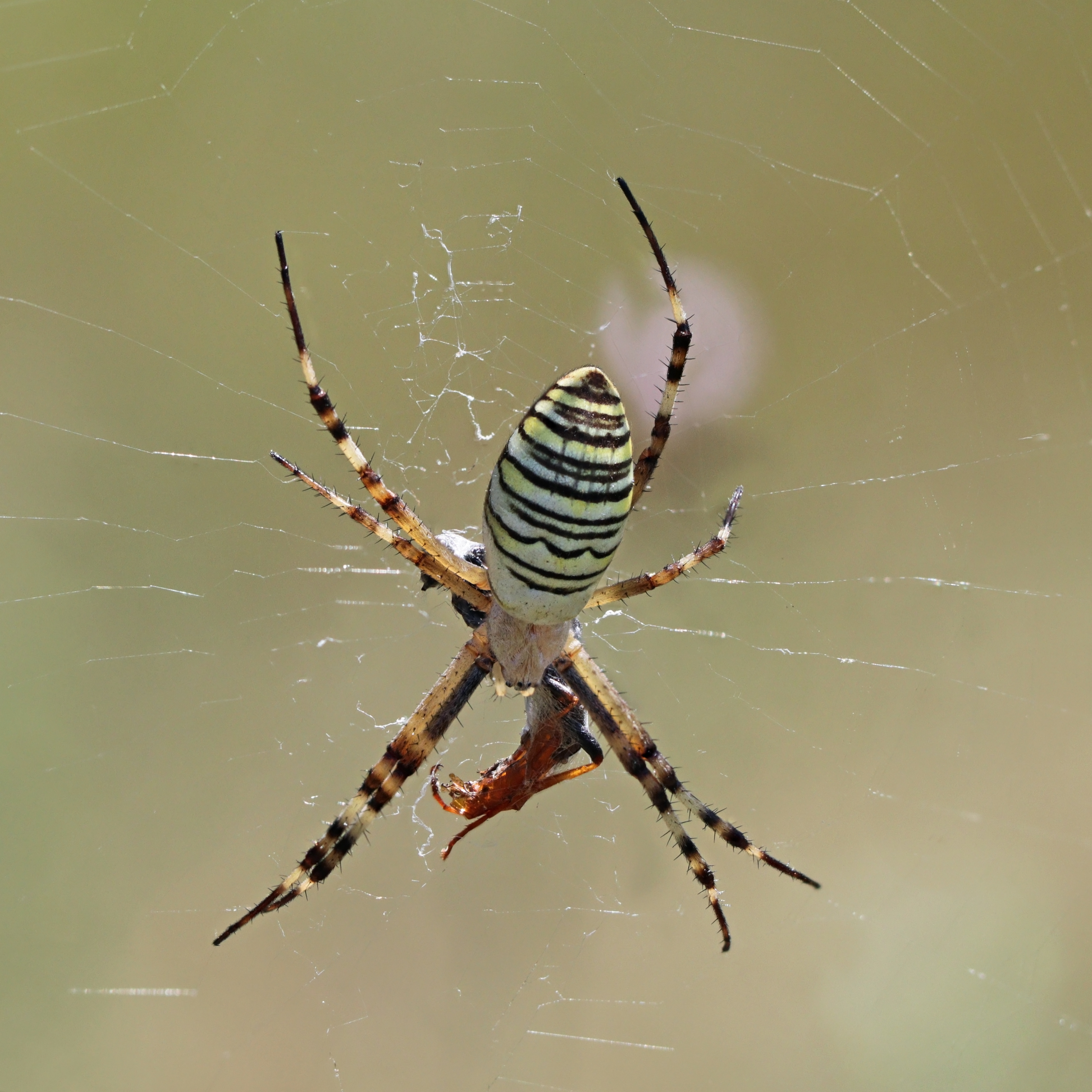
With wrapped prey, female dorsal side

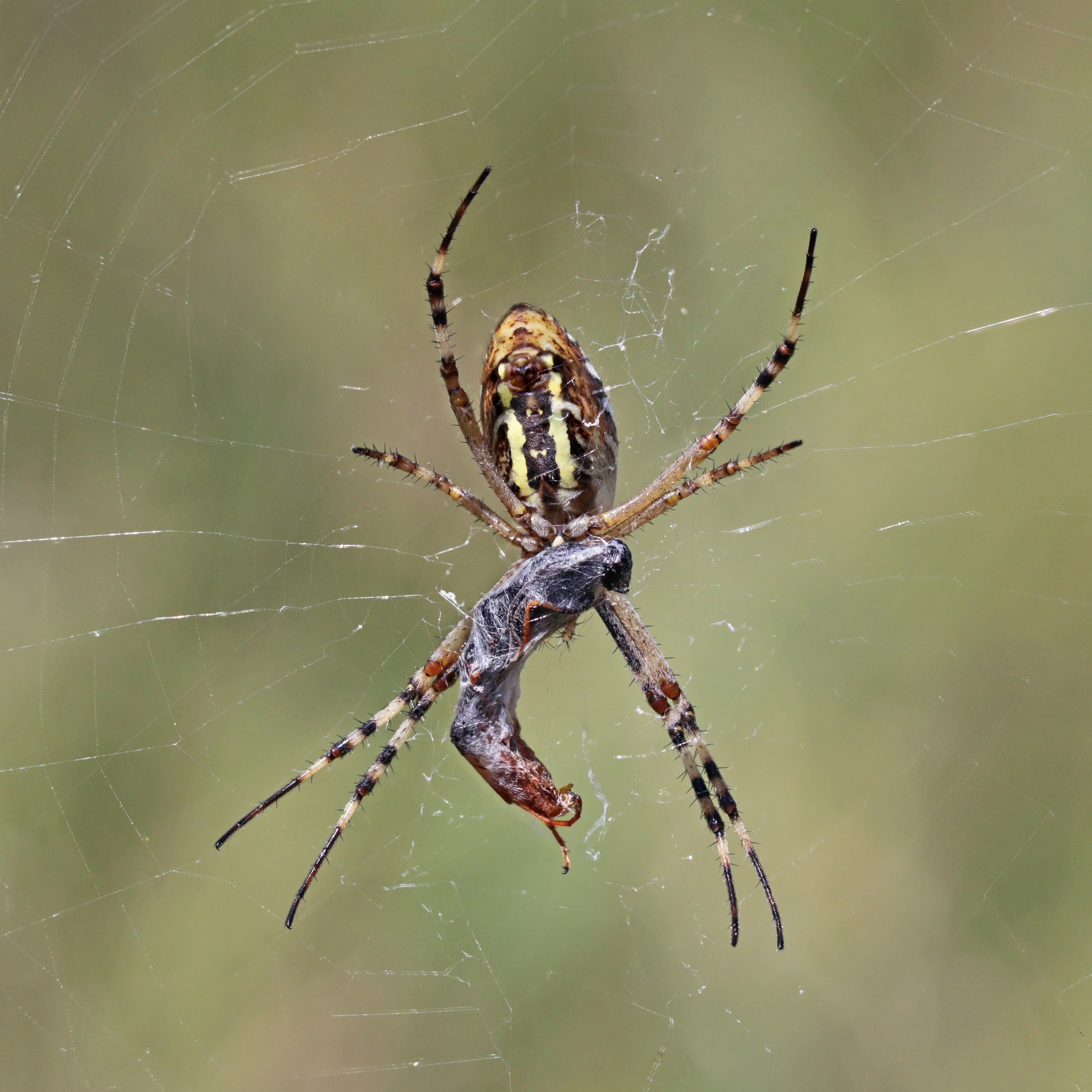
With wrapped prey, female ventral side

== Population ==
During the summer of 2006, research found that there had been an influx of wasp spiders in the UK. The colouration of this population is similar, although the yellow stripes are more cream-coloured.

Besides the nominate subspecies, there is one subspecies currently recognized:

- Argiope bruennichi nigrofasciata Franganillo, 1910 (Portugal)

== Mating ==
Certain male Argiope bruennichi have developed an adaptation to ensure that they are the only male whom the female can produce offspring with. They are able to "plug" the female after they have mated with her to prevent other males from copulating with the female. This plugging involves losing one of his pedipalps, thus allowing him to mate only twice. This explains the rushed behaviour a male exhibits after the female has completed her final moult. With males always waiting around for the females to reach full maturity, the race is on for the male who is small enough to not be detected, yet is also able to "plug" the female, as to prevent other males from reproducing with the same female. Because of the damage caused to the male spiders when this act takes place, these spiders are usually monogamous.

If the females are only able to reproduce once, they must develop a method to produce more offspring at one time (per clutch). This can be caused by multiple things, including a sex ratio that forces these males to make sure they have at least one female to produce their offspring simply because there are not as many females present. They need to develop this larger clutch size to ensure that their genes are passed down based on the survivability of her first clutch.

Argiope bruennichi participate in sexual cannibalism. The females of this species, typically much larger than the males, almost always consume their male counterparts after copulation. To combat this, males often wait in or near an immature female's web until she completes her final moult and reaches sexual maturity. After moulting, the female's chelicerae will be soft for a short period and the male may mate without the danger of being eaten. A study into the mating behaviors of A. bruennichi showed that this tactic raises the chances of the male's survival from 20% (with conventional mating) to 97%.

== Effects of micronutrients ==
Females that consumed a small supplement of dietary essential amino acids produced offspring that survived simulated overwintering conditions significantly longer than offspring of other treatments. Results suggest that dietary essential amino acids, which may be sequestered by males from their diet, could be valuable supplements that increase the success of the offspring of cannibalistic females.
