= Toticoryx =

Scientific classification
- Kingdom: Animalia
- Phylum: Arthropoda
- Subphylum: Chelicerata
- Class: Arachnida
- Order: Araneae
- Infraorder: Araneomorphae
- Family: Salticidae
- Genus: Toticoryx; Rollard & Wesołowska, 2002
- Species: T. exilis

Binomial name
- Toticoryx exilis Rollard & Wesołowska, 2002

Genus of spiders

Toticoryx is a spider genus of the jumping spider family, Salticidae. Its single described species, Toticoryx exilis is found in Guinea.

== Name ==
The describers state that the genus name is an arbitrary combination of letters. The specific name exilis is Latin for "slender", referring to the spider's body shape.

== Appearance ==
This spider is only 3 mm long and very flat. In general appearance it resembles Pseudicius. Only the female has been found.
