= Heliophanus heurtaultae =

Scientific classification
- Kingdom: Animalia
- Phylum: Arthropoda
- Subphylum: Chelicerata
- Class: Arachnida
- Order: Araneae
- Infraorder: Araneomorphae
- Family: Salticidae
- Genus: Heliophanus
- Species: H. heurtaultae

Binomial name
- Heliophanus heurtaultae Wesołowska & Rollard, 2002

Species of spider

Heliophanus heurtaultae is a jumping spider species in the genus Heliophanus. It was first identified in 2002 and lives in Guinea.
