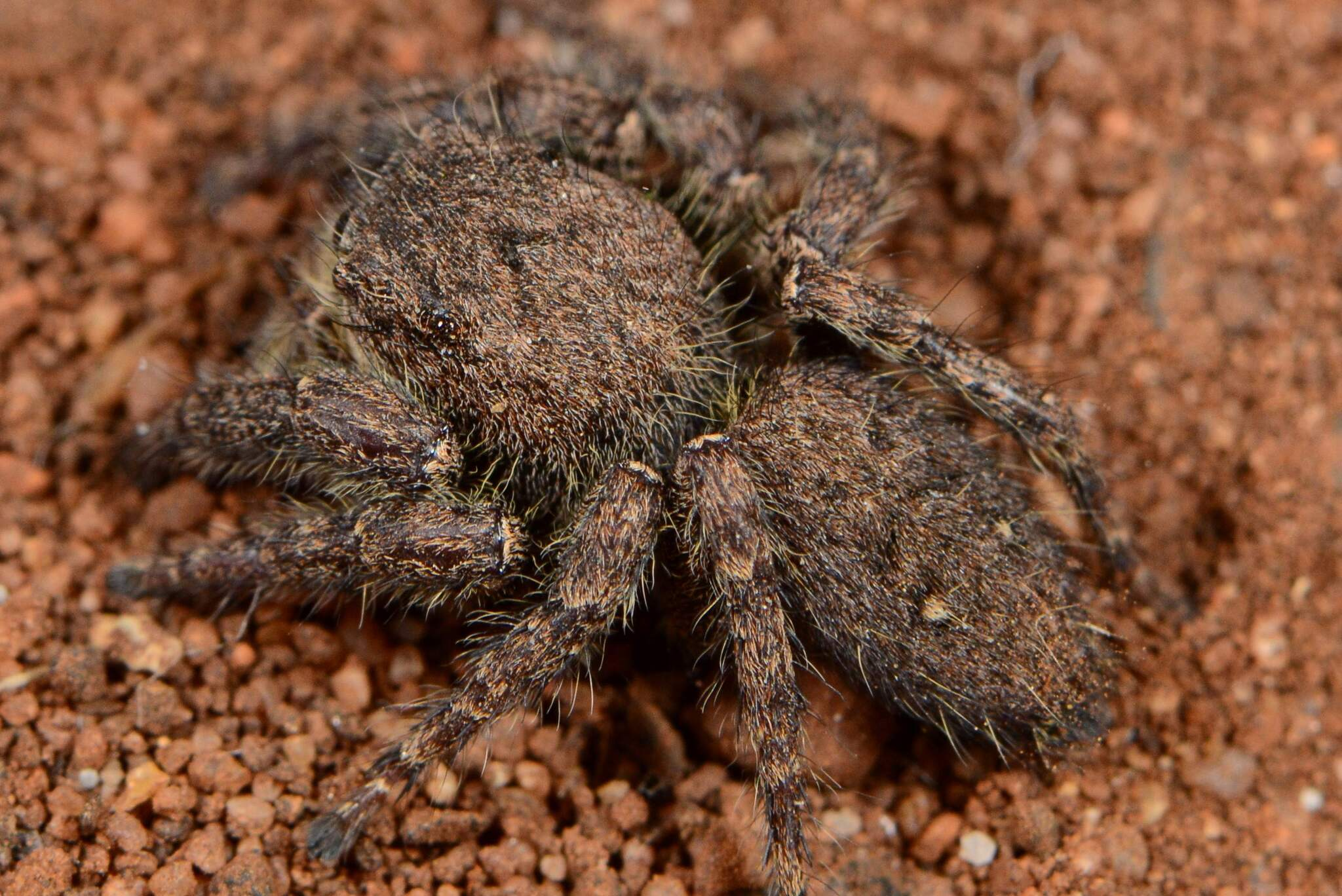
- female N. hirsuta
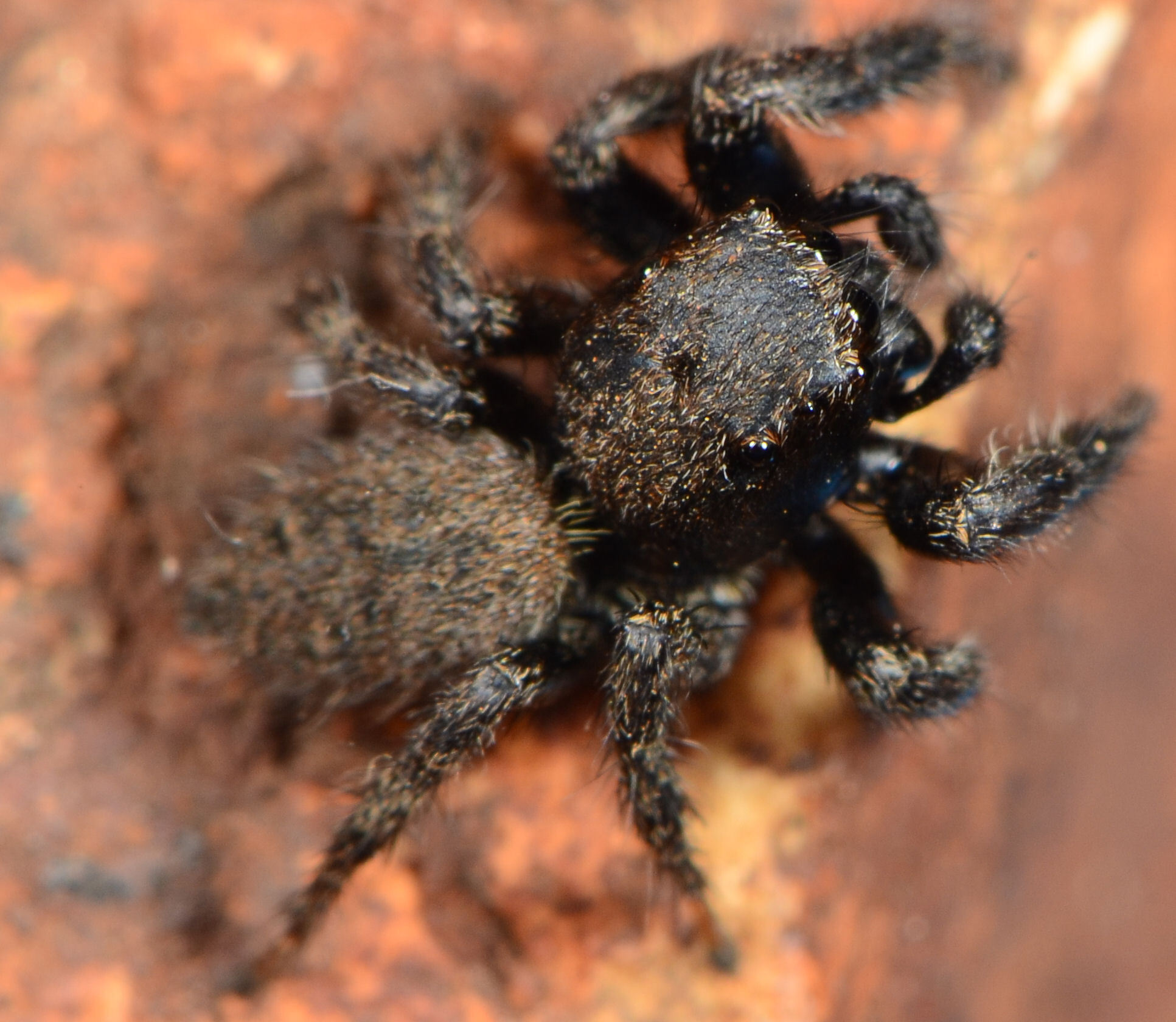
- male N. hirsuta

Scientific classification
- Kingdom: Animalia
- Phylum: Arthropoda
- Subphylum: Chelicerata
- Class: Arachnida
- Order: Araneae
- Infraorder: Araneomorphae
- Family: Salticidae
- Subfamily: Salticinae
- Genus: Nigorella; Wesolowska & Tomasiewicz, 2008

Type species
- N. aethiopica Wesolowska & Tomasiewicz, 2008

Species
- 10, see text

= Nigorella =

Genus of spiders

Nigorella is a genus of jumping spiders that was first described by Wanda Wesołowska & Beata Tomasiewicz in 2008. The name is described as "an arbitrary combination of letters", feminine in gender. Three previously species described were transferred to the genus: Pachypoessa albimana as N. albimana, Philaeus manicus as N. manica, and Euophrys plebeja as N. plebeja. Subsequently it was discovered that Euophrys plebeja was a nomen dubium, with no known type specimen.

== Distribution ==
Nigorella are found in Asia and Africa.

== Description ==
They are robustly built salticids with a body length ranging from 5.5 to 11 millimetres (1/4 to 1/2 in). The first pair of legs is the longest. They are dark in color, with no distinct patterning.

Members of this genus can be distinguished from others by the structure of the copulatory organs. The male pedipalp has a single short apophysis on its tibia. The palpal bulb has a rounded tegulum and a short embolus with an additional terminal apophysis.

The female epigyne is wider than long with two lateral copulatory openings. The inlet to the seminal ducts is hidden in deep cavities.

== Species ==
As of October 2025, this genus includes ten species:

- Nigorella aethiopica Wesołowska & Tomasiewicz, 2008 – Ethiopia (type species)
- Nigorella albimana (Simon, 1902) – Guinea, Ivory Coast, Nigeria, DR Congo
- Nigorella hirsuta Wesołowska, 2009 – Zimbabwe, Mozambique, South Africa
- Nigorella hirticeps (Song & Chai, 1992) – China
- Nigorella huaping S. Q. Liu & Zhang, 2025 – China
- Nigorella manica (G. W. Peckham & E. G. Peckham, 1903) – Zimbabwe
- Nigorella mengla Lin & Li, 2020 – China
- Nigorella orientalis (Song & Chai, 1992) – China
- Nigorella petrae (Prószyński, 1992) – Thailand
- Nigorella sichuanensis (Peng, Xie & Kim, 1993) – China
