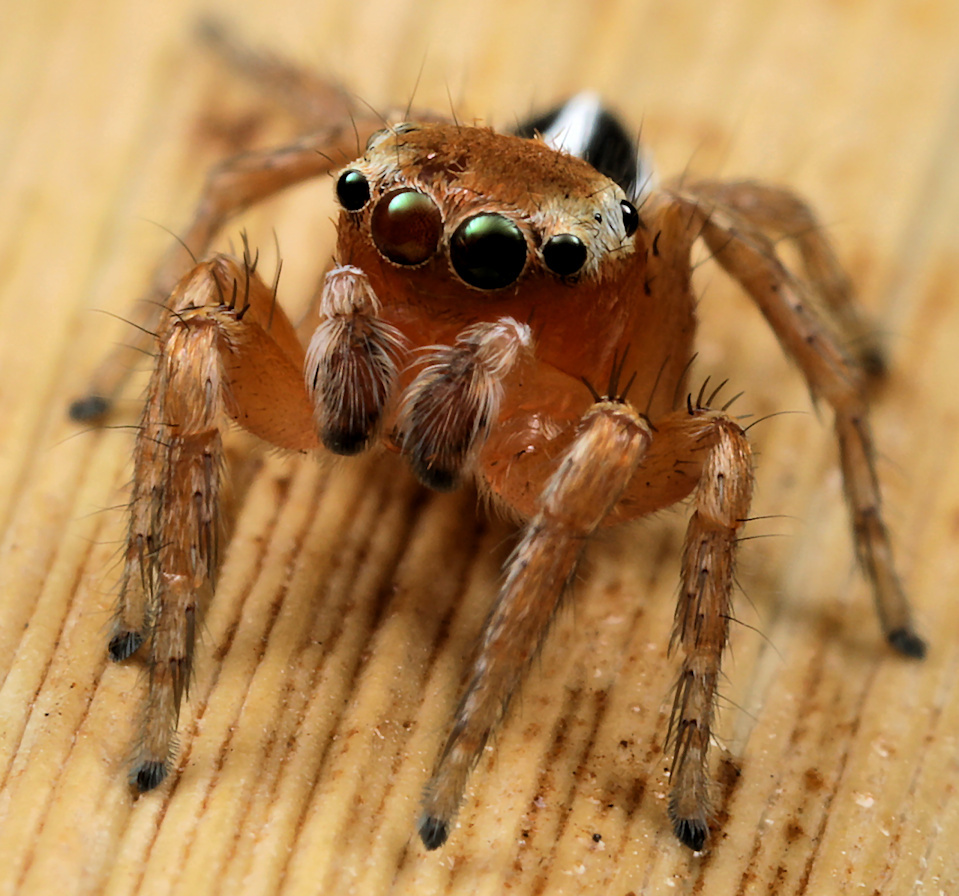
- The related Evarcha striolata

Scientific classification
- Kingdom: Animalia
- Phylum: Arthropoda
- Subphylum: Chelicerata
- Class: Arachnida
- Order: Araneae
- Infraorder: Araneomorphae
- Family: Salticidae
- Genus: Evarcha
- Species: E. acuta

Binomial name
- Evarcha acuta Wesołowska, 2006

Synonyms
- Evacin acuta Wesołowska, 2006

= Evarcha acuta =

Species of spider

Evarcha acuta is a species of jumping spider in the genus Evarcha that lives in Namibia, Seychelles and South Africa. The species was first described in 2006 by Wanda Wesołowska. The spider is small, with a carapace measuring typically 1.6 mm (0.06 in) long and an abdomen between 1.4 and 1.9 mm (0.06 and 0.07 in) long. The carapace is light brown with a short black eye field. The abdomen has patterns that vary depending on geography. The holotype, found near Brandberg Mountain in Namibia, has lines of brown patches on the top. Examples found in Free State, South Africa, have black lines on the top and sides. The spider can be most easily distinguished from other spiders in the genus by its copulatory organs. The male has a distinctive notch on a long straight projection from its tibia known as a tibial apophysis and a long embolus. The female has not been described.

== Taxonomy ==
Evarcha acuta is a species of jumping spider that was first described by Wanda Wesołowska in 2006. It was one of over 500 species that she identified during her career, making her one of the most prolific arachnologists of all time. She allocated it to the genus Evarcha, first circumscribed by Eugène Simon in 1902. The genus is one of the largest, with members found on four continents.

In 1976, Jerzy Prószyński placed the genus was placed in the subfamily Pelleninae, along with the genera Bianor and Pellenes. In Wayne Maddison's 2015 study of spider phylogenetic classification, the genus Evarcha was moved to the subtribe Plexippina. This is a member of the tribe Plexippini, which is itself part of the subclade Simonida in the clade Saltafresia. The genus is closely related to the genera Hyllus and Plexippus. Analysis of protein-coding genes showed it was particularly related to Telamonia. In the following year, Prószyński added the genus to a group of genera named Evarchines, named after the genus, along with Hasarinella and Nigorella based on similarities in the spiders' copulatory organs.

Prószyński placed the spider in a new genus Evacin in 2018 based on its similarity to Evarcha striolata and difference to others Evarcha spiders. This designation is not widely accepted and the species remains in the Evarcha genus in the World Spider Catalog. Prószyński has subsequently also listed the spider in the Evarcha genus. The species is named for the sharp end to the male spider's embolus.

== Description ==
Evarcha acuta is a small spider, typical for the genus. The male has a medium high to high and broad light brown carapace that is typically 1.6 mm (0.06 in) long and 1.0 mm (0.04 in) wide. The eye field is short and black with brown bristles around the eyes. There are tufts of white and yellow hairs towards the front of the eye field. The spider's face or clypeus is brown with white hairs. The underside, or sternum, is brownish-orange. The mouthparts are distinctive with light brown or black chelicerae, orange-brown or light brown labium and orange-brown or light brown maxillae.

The male spider's abdomen is narrower than its carapace, measuring between 1.4 and 1.9 mm (0.06 and 0.07 in) in length and having a width of between 1.0 and 1.2 mm (0.04 and 0.05 in). It is a whitish-grey or yellowish-grey elongated oval. The specimen found in Namibia have a pattern of small brown patches forming three long lines on top and a pale underside; those found in South Africa have black marks make a line down the centre of the top, there are black lines towards the lighter sides and two narrow darker stripes on the yellow underside. The front portion of some examples is covered with a small orange scutum. The abdomen has a covering of delicate pale hairs. The spider has yellow spinnerets with brown tips. The legs are generally dark yellow with brown hairs and brown or yellow spines. In some examples, the legs are tinged brown at the ends. In others, sections some are brown. The pedipalps are brown or black.

The spider's copulatory organs are distinctive. The palpal bulb is relatively broad and rounded with a distinctive shape to the bump that is found towards the bottom. It has long tapered embolus that is bent towards, and extends almost completely over the top of, the palpal bulb. There is a long straight projection from the palpal tibia, called a tibial apophysis, which is broad with a notch at the tip. The female is not yet described.

The species is similar to the related Evarcha bakorensis, differing in the structure of the copulatory organs. The male has a longer embolus and a wider tibial apophysis with a characteristic notch. on the palpal bulb. It differs from the related Evarcha dena in the presence of a characteristic lobe on the palpal bulb. The similar Evarcha ignea has a notch but it is larger in this spider. The embolus is also longer and the clypeus has a covering of white hairs that the other species lacks.

== Distribution and habitat ==
Evarcha spiders live across the world, although those found in North America may be accidental migrants. The genus is found across Africa. Evarcha acuta lives in Namibia, Seychelles and South Africa. The male holotype for the species was found in the Hungarob Ravine near Brandberg Mountain in Namibia at an altitude of 1,200 m (3,900 ft) above sea level. The first example to be found in South Africa was identified in 2013 on the southern slopes of hillsides in the Amanzi Private Game Reserve near Brandfort in Free State.

Unlike other species in the genus, Evarcha acuta is a ground-dwelling spider. It lives in dense shrubland. The spider lives in less dense communities than related spiders that live in cultivated pastures and open grasslands.
