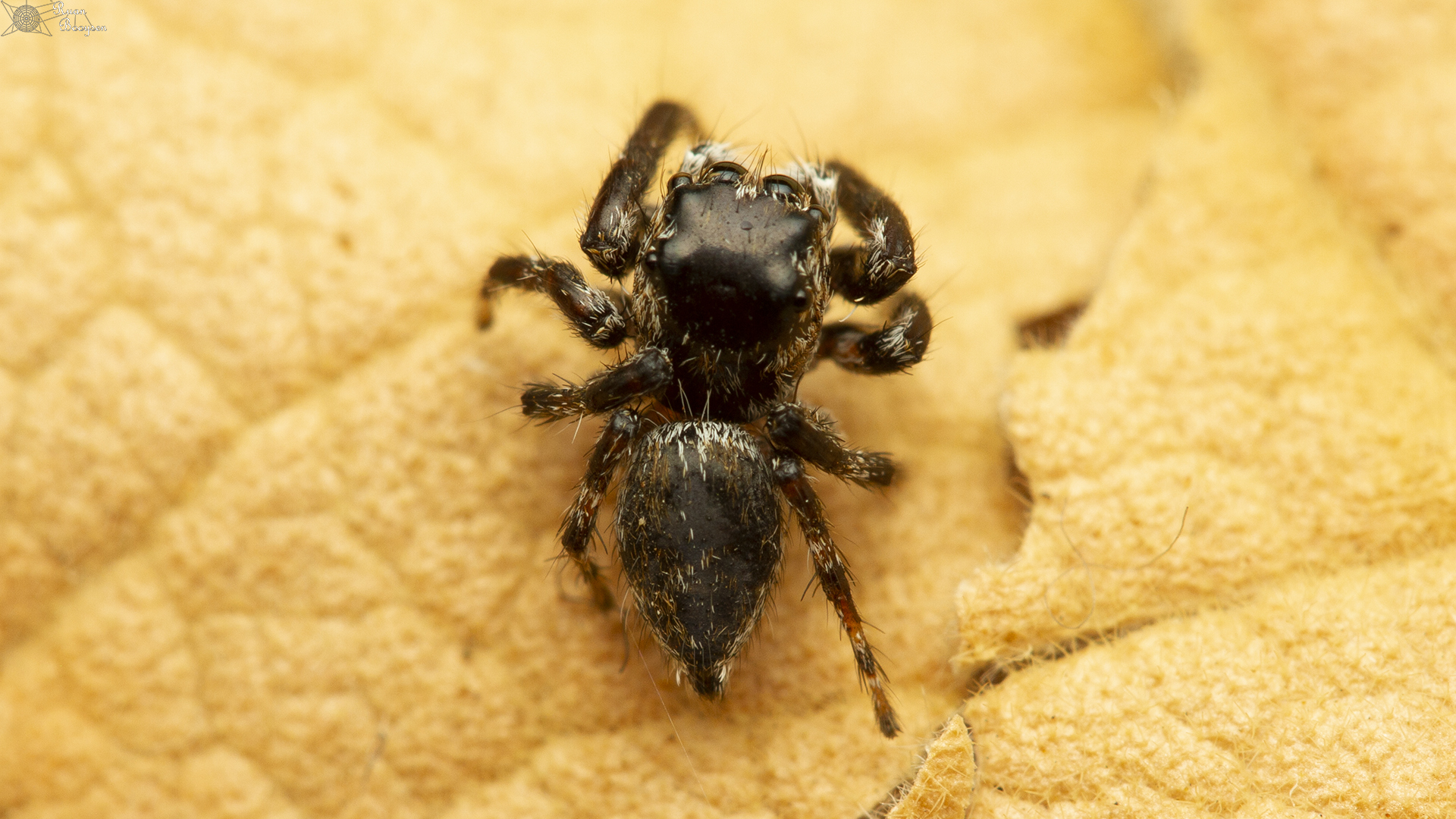

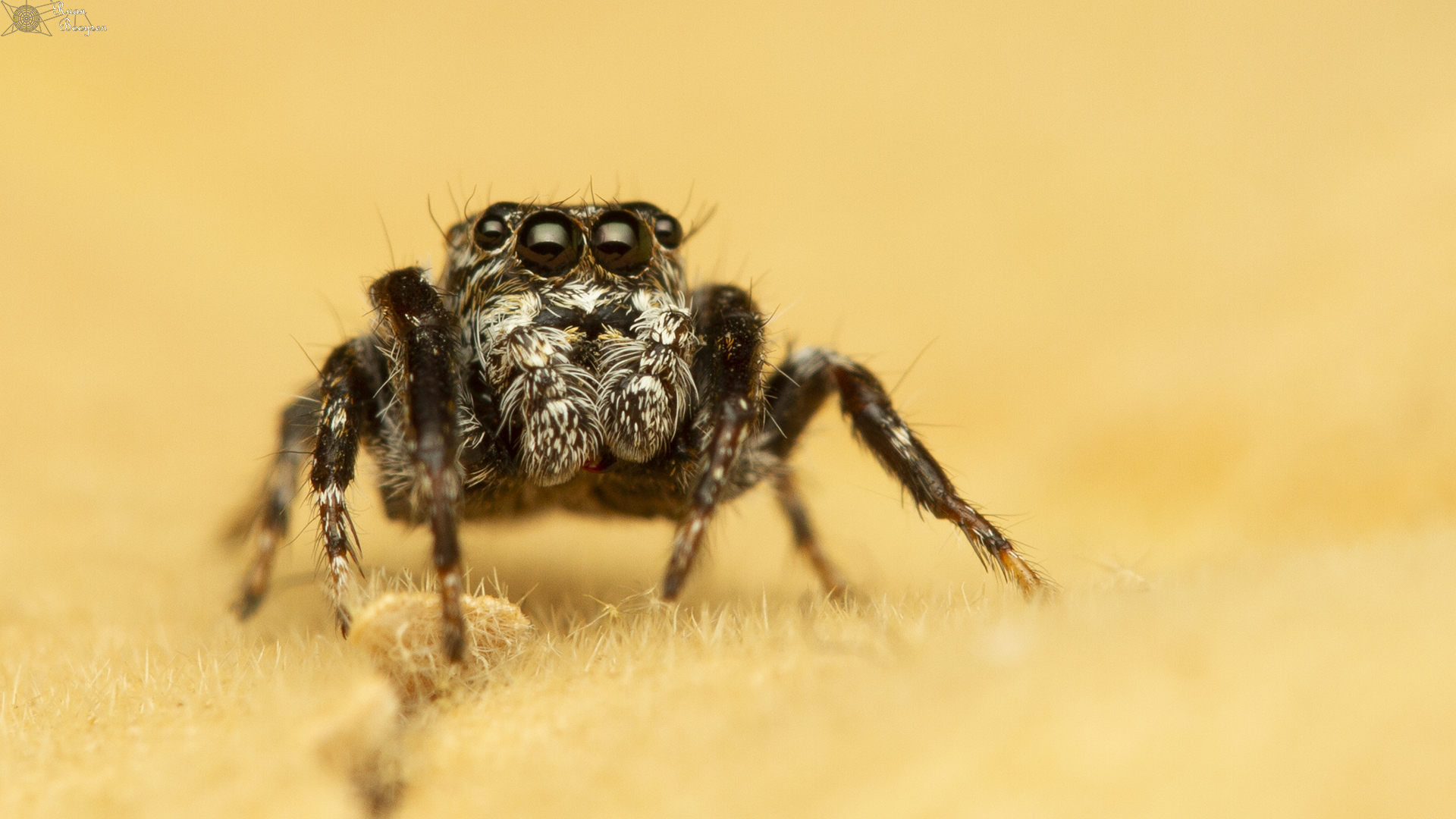

Scientific classification
- Kingdom: Animalia
- Phylum: Arthropoda
- Subphylum: Chelicerata
- Class: Arachnida
- Order: Araneae
- Infraorder: Araneomorphae
- Family: Salticidae
- Genus: Evarcha
- Species: E. karas

Binomial name
- Evarcha karas Wesołowska, 2011

= Evarcha karas =

Species of spider

Evarcha karas is a species of jumping spider in the genus Evarcha that was first described in 2011 by Wanda Wesołowska. Originally only found in Namibia, it has also been discovered living in South Africa. It is a ground-dwelling spider that mainly lives in dry Nama Karoo shrublands. Only the male has been described. It is small, with an oval dark brown to black cephalothorax and a thinner ovoid abdomen that are each between 2.2 and 2.6 mm (0.09 and 0.10 in) in length. The abdomen has thin white stripes along its middle and sides, which helps differentiate it from the related Evarcha flagellaris that also lives in the same area of the world. It can also be distinguished by its copulatory organs, including the long spike on its palpal tibia, or tibial apophysis, that has a tip with two points, and its very long thin embolus.

== Taxonomy ==
Evarcha karas is a species of jumping spider that was first described by Wanda Wesołowska in 2011. She allocated it to the genus Evarcha, first circumscribed by Eugène Simon in 1902. It was one of over 500 species identified by the Polish arachnologist during her career, more than any other contemporary writer and second only to Simon in the science. The genus is one of the largest, with members found on four continents.

In 1976, Jerzy Prószyński placed the genus Evarcha in the subfamily Pelleninae, along with the genera Bianor and Pellenes. In Wayne Maddison's 2015 study of spider phylogenetic classification, the genus Evarcha was moved to the subtribe Plexippina. This is a member of the tribe Plexippini, in the subclade Simonida in the clade Saltafresia. It is closely related to the genera Hyllus and Plexippus. Analysis of protein-coding genes showed it was particularly related to Telamonia. In the following year, Prószyński added the genus to a group of genera named Evarchines, named after the genus, along with Hasarinella and Nigorella based on similarities in the spiders' copulatory organs. The species name recalls the location it was first found.

== Description ==
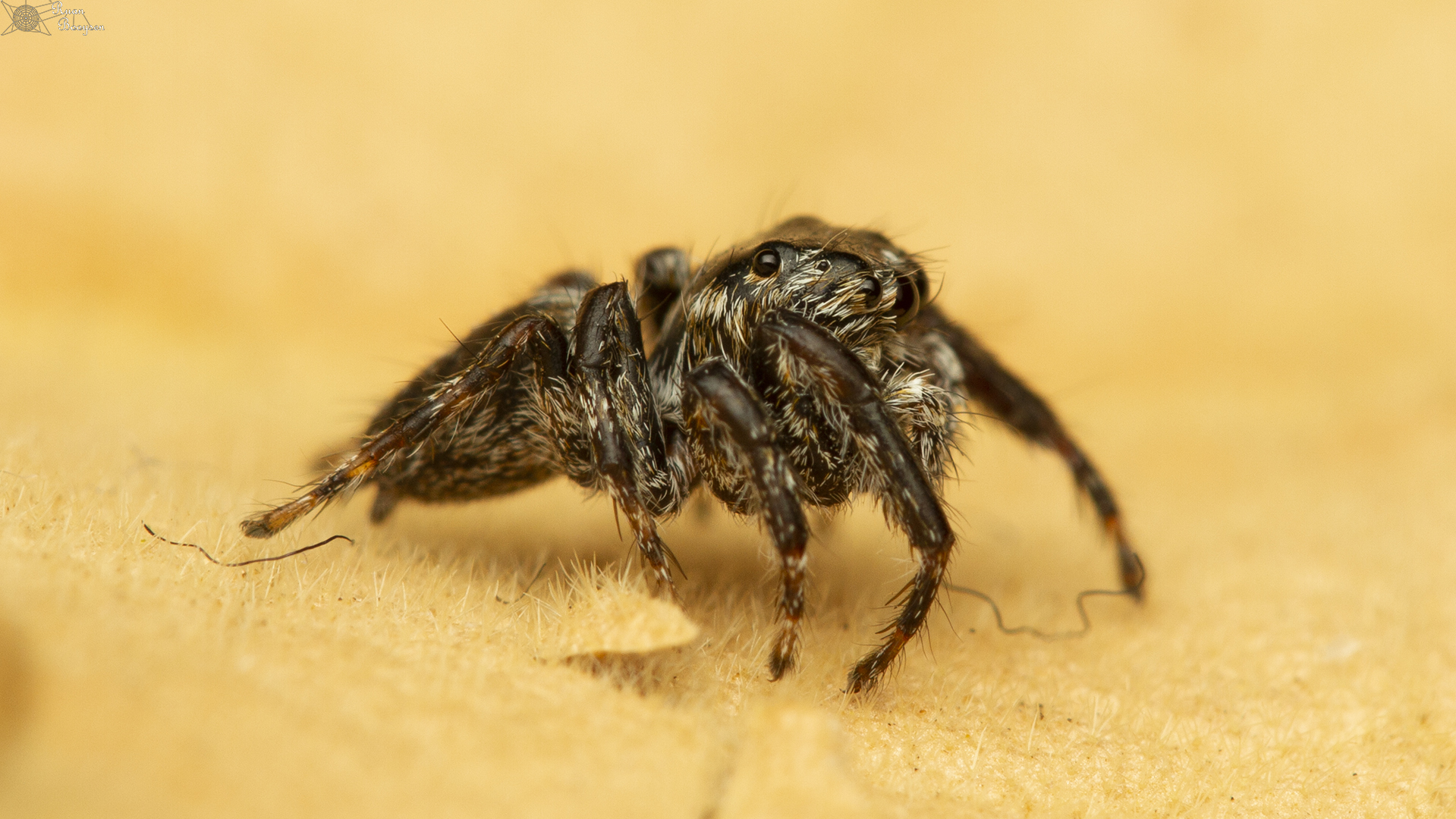

Evarcha karas is a small spider, similar in shape to others in the genus, with a body divided into two main parts: an oval cephalothorax and an ovoid abdomen. The male has a cephalothorax, that is between 2.2 and 2.6 mm (0.09 and 0.10 in) long and 1.7 and 1.9 mm (0.07 and 0.07 in) wide. The hard upper part of the cephalothorax, or carapace, is high and dark brown to black, covered in greyish-white or white hairs. There are long brown bristles on the black eye field, some of them in tufts alongside a pattern of lines formed of white hairs near the eyes themselves. The tufts of hair are reminiscent of horns. The sides have a covering of short white hairs. The underside of the cephalothorax, or sternum, is yellowish-orange in Namibian examples and darker in those from South Africa. The spider's face, or clypeus, is moderately high and brownish with a covering of white hairs to the base. The chelicerae also feature white hairs, while the remainder of the mouthparts, including the labium and maxillae, are brown.

The spider's abdomen is similar in length to the carapace but narrower, 1.6 and 1.8 mm (0.06 and 0.07 in) in width, and more rounded. The top is generally black with thin white stripes down the middle and along the sides. In the same way as the carapace, the underside differs between geographies, with the South African spiders being blackish while those from Namibia are light with a hint of grey. The spider has dark grey spinnerets. Namibian spiders have light brown legs while those from South Africa are black, the former also having a longer front pair of legs than the remainder. All have brown spines and hairs. The spider's pedipalps match their legs, although, while South African spiders have mainly brown hairs with a scattering of white, those from Namibia have exclusively white hairs.

The female has not been identified, so only the male copulatory organs have been described. They are generally hairy. The long palpal tibia has a relatively large and prominent upward-pointing spike, or tibial apophysis, which has an end that finishes in two small similarly-sized points, one of which looks like a tooth. The palpal bulb is rounded, from which emanates a very long embolus that starts near the bottom and circles round to the top of the bulb, curving towards the tegulum with a whip-like tip. There are small white scales on the spider's cymbium.

The spider is similar to others in the genus, particularly the related Evarcha flagellaris that can also be found in similar geographies. It can be distinguished by the striped pattern on its abdomen. The copulatory organs are also distinctive. The tibial apophysis is wider than in the other species and has two tips rather than one, and the embolus is longer.

== Distribution ==
Evarcha spiders live across the world, although those found in North America may be accidental migrants. Evarcha karas lives in Namibia and South Africa. The male holotype was discovered in 2003 near Keetmanshoop. The first example to be found in South Africa were found in 2015 in Laingsburg Local Municipality in Western Cape. It is a ground-dwelling spider that thrives in a wide range of environments. It has been seen both in open ground and living under rocks. Some have been discovered living near water, such as the Floriskraal Dam. It is particularly common in dry Nama Karoo shrublands.

=== Bibliography ===
- Maddison, Wayne P. (2015). "A phylogenetic classification of jumping spiders (Araneae: Salticidae)". The Journal of Arachnology. 43 (3): 231–292. doi:10.1636/arac-43-03-231-292. S2CID 85680279.
- Maddison, Wayne P.; Bodner, Melissa R.; Needham, Karen M. (2008). "Salticid spider phylogeny revisited, with the discovery of a large Australasian clade (Araneae: Salticidae)". Zootaxa. 1893: 49–64. doi:10.11646/zootaxa.1893.1.3.
- Maddison, Wayne P .; Hedin, Marshal C. (2003). "Jumping spider phylogeny (Araneae: Salticidae)". Invertebrate Systematics. 17 (4): 529–549. doi:10.1071/IS02044.
- Prószyński, Jerzy (2017). "Pragmatic classification of the world's Salticidae (Araneae)". Ecologica Montenegrina. 12: 1–133. doi:10.37828/em.2017.12.1.
- Prószyński, Jerzy (2018). "Review of genera Evarcha and Nigorella, with comments on Emertonius, Padilothorax [sic], Stagetillus, and description of five new genera and two new species (Araneae: Salticidae)". Ecologica Montenegrina. 16: 130–179. doi:10.37828/em.2018.16.12.
- Wesołowska, Wanda (2011). "New species and new records of jumping spiders from Botswana, Namibia and Zimbabwe (Araneae: Salticidae)". Genus. 22 (2): 307–346.
- Wesołowska, Wanda; Haddad, Charles R. (2018). "Further additions to the jumping spider fauna of South Africa (Araneae: Salticidae)". Annales Zoologici. 68 (4): 879–908. doi:10.3161/00034541ANZ2018.68.4.011. S2CID 86626109.
- Wiśniewski, Konrad (2020). "Over 40 years with jumping spiders: on the 70th birthday of Wanda Wesołowska". Zootaxa. 4899 (1): 5–14. doi:10.11646/zootaxa.4899.1.3. PMID 33756825. S2CID 232337200.
