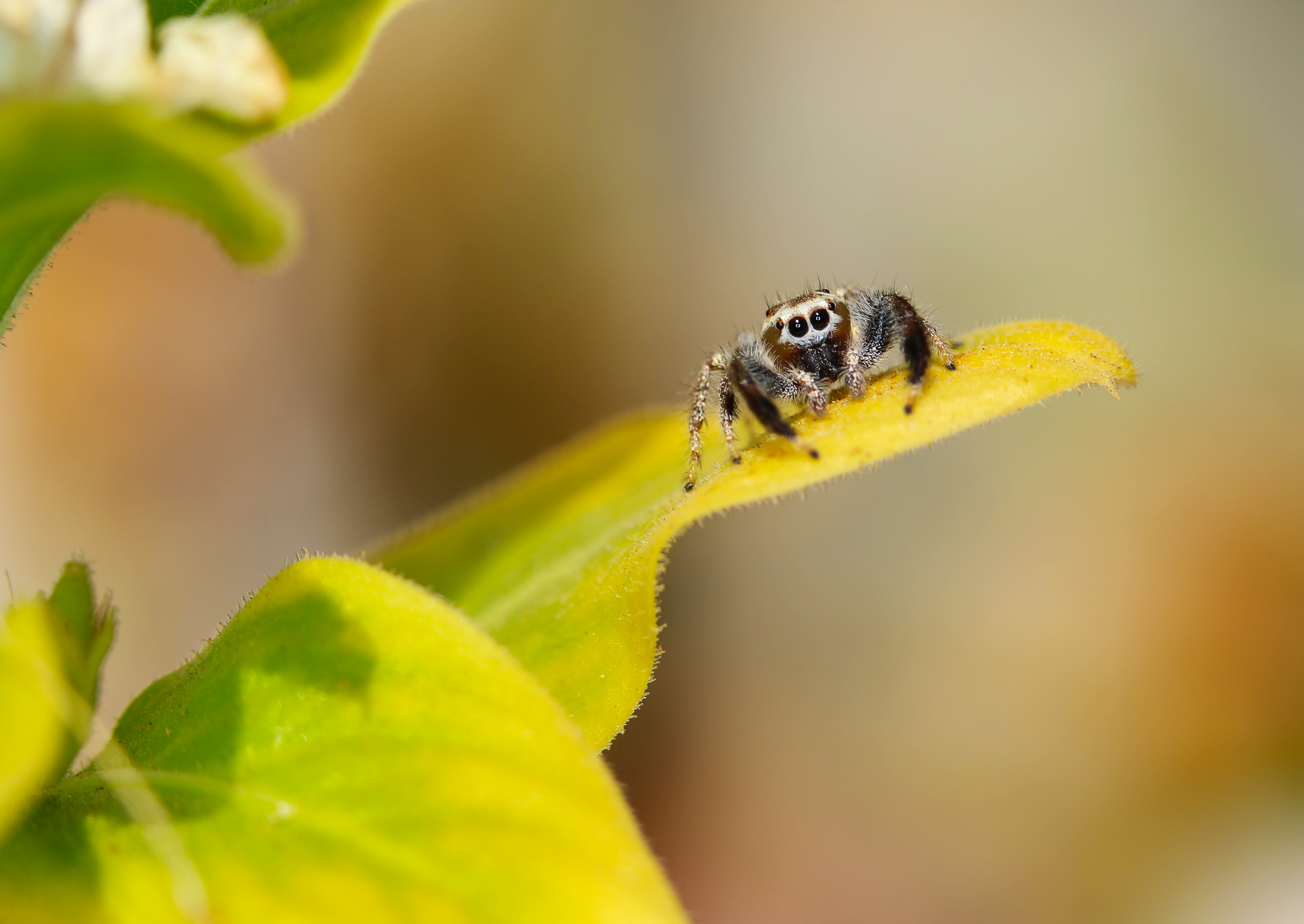
- Evarcha seyun in Mushrif Park, Dubai

Scientific classification
- Kingdom: Animalia
- Phylum: Arthropoda
- Subphylum: Chelicerata
- Class: Arachnida
- Order: Araneae
- Infraorder: Araneomorphae
- Family: Salticidae
- Genus: Evarcha
- Species: E. seyun

Binomial name
- Evarcha seyun Wesołowska & van Harten, 2007

Synonyms
- Evaneg seyun (Wesolowska & van Harten, 2007)

= Evarcha seyun =

Species of spider

Evarcha seyun, the Bull's Eye Jumper, is a species of jumping spider in the genus Evarcha that is endemic to the Arabian Peninsula. It seems to be common across many of the Emirates of the United Arab Emirates and al-Mahrah and Hadramaut Governorates of Yemen. The species was first described in 2007 by Wanda Wesołowska and Antonius van Harten. The spider is small, with a cephalothorax that measures between 2.2 and 2.6 mm (0.09 and 0.10 in) long and an abdomen that is between 2 and 2.7 mm (0.08 and 0.11 in) long. The female is hairier than the male. The female spider is generally brown with a darker eye field, while the male is dark brown with a black eye field. Both have legs that are black, orange and yellow. They can be distinguished from the closely related Evarcha praeclara by the patterns on their body, including a semi-lunar marking in the middle of its carapace and a light stripe on its abdomen. The species also has distinctive copulatory organs. The female has a characteristic depression in the middle of its epigyne and narrow insemination ducts that lead to complex spermathecae. The male has a spade-like apophysis that accompanies its embolus and a short blunt tibial apophysis.

== Taxonomy ==
The Bull's Eye Jumper, or Evarcha seyun, is a species of jumping spider, a member of the family Salticidae, that was first described by Wanda Wesołowska and Antonius van Harten in 2007. They allocated it to the genus Evarcha, first circumscribed by Eugène Simon in 1902. It was one of over 500 species identified by the Polish arachnologist Wesołowska during her career, more than any other contemporary writer and second only to Simon in the history of the science. The genus is one of the largest, with members found on four continents. The species is named after the place where its holotype was found.

In 1976, Jerzy Prószyński placed the genus Evarcha in the subfamily Pelleninae, along with the genera Bianor and Pellenes. In Wayne Maddison's 2015 study of spider phylogenetic classification, the genus Evarcha was moved to the subtribe Plexippina. This is a member of the tribe Plexippini, in the subclade Simonida in the clade Saltafresia. It is closely related to the genera Hyllus and Plexippus. Analysis of protein-coding genes showed it was particularly related to Telamonia. In the following year, Prószyński added the genus to a group of genera named Evarchines, named after the genus, along with Hasarinella and Nigorella, based on similarities in the spiders' copulatory organs.

In 2018, Prószyński placed the spider in a new genus Evaneg based on its copulatory organs and the way that they differ from other Evarcha spiders. The name is based on the relationship between the genus and its type species Evarcha negevensis. This designation is not widely accepted and the species remains in the Evarcha genus in the World Spider Catalog.

== Description ==
Evarcha seyun is a small spider with a body divided into two main parts: cephalothorax and an abdomen. The male has a cephalothorax, that is between 2.2 and 2.3 mm (0.09 and 0.09 in) long and 1.6 and 1.7 mm (0.06 and 0.07 in) wide. The rounded carapace, the hard upper part of the cephalothorax, is dark brown with a darker rear and a lighter semi-lunar marking in the middle. The eye field is black with dense white hairs forming a light patch in the middle, in some examples dividing by two thin fawn lines, and fawn scales around some of the eyes themselves. In some examples, there are horns made of tufts of long dark hairs near the middle eyes. The underside of the cephalothorax, or sternum, is brownish. The spider's face, or clypeus, is yellowish-brown with a covering of white hairs. Its mouthparts, consisting of the chelicerae, labium and maxillae, are generally brown although there are whitish edges to the tips of the maxillae, which also have a covering of dark hairs.

The male spider's abdomen narrower than the carapace. It measures between 2.0 and 2.3 mm (0.08 and 0.09 in) in length and has a width of between 1.3 and 1.5 mm (0.05 and 0.06 in). The top is generally dark brown with a white area to the front and a wide white band extending near to the end. The underside is yellow marked with a large dark grey triangular patch. Dense hairs cover the whole abdomen, varying from dark brown to white depending on the background, interspersed with a scattering of longer brown hairs. The spider has yellow spinnerets, with darker patches visible on the rearmost pair. Its legs are black, orange and yellow and marked with a large number of long brown spines. The pedipalps are brownish-yellow.

The female has a cephalothorax that is between 2.4 and 2.6 mm (0.09 and 0.10 in) long and 1.7 and 1.9 mm (0.07 and 0.07 in) wide and an abdomen that is between 2.3 and 2.7 mm (0.09 and 0.11 in) long and 1.6 and 1.8 mm (0.06 and 0.07 in) wide. It is generally hairier that the male. It It is also slightly larger and lighter. Its carapace is a lighter brown and the eye field dark brown rather than black. It is covered in dense white hairs interspersed with brown bristles. There are tufts of long dark hairs near the eyes like the male. The spider's clypeus has white hairs. Its abdomen has a yellowish top with white spots forming a pattern divided into three segments by darker lines.

The spider has distinctive copulatory organs. The male has a rounded palpal bulb with a relatively long embolus that projects from near its top. The embolus is accompanied by a large spatula-like apophysis. There are small hairs on the cymbium and longer hairs on the palpal tibia. The tibia has a short blunt protrusion, or tibial apophysis. The female has a large rounded depression in the middle of its epigyne. The copulatory openings are mounted to the back and lead to very large many-chambered spermathecae, or receptacles. The insemination ducts have some sclerotisation, but it is much stronger in the spermathecae. The accessory glands are long.

The spider is closely related to Evarcha praeclara, but can be clearly identified by the difference in their external patterns. For example, this spider's abdomen has a light stripe compared to the lighter patches on the other species. The female also has a different depression in its epigyne, both in terms of size and shape. The male has a shorter tibial apophysis, which resembles that on Evarcha armeniaca, although the clear difference in the shape of the embolus on this spider means that they can still be differentiated.

== Distribution ==
Evarcha spiders live across the world, although those found in North America may be accidental migrants. Evarcha seyun is endemic to the Arabian Peninsula and lives in the United Arab Emirates and Yemen. The holotype was discovered in 2002 in Yemen near Seyun, the area after which it is named. The spider has been observed living in the Al Mahrah and Hadramaut Governorates.

The first examples identified in the United Arab Emirates were initially found on Jebel Hafeet in 2003. It was subsequently seen at different locations across the Emirates of Ajman and Sharjah. For example, multiple examples were found in Wadi Shawka in 2006 and another female in Wadi Bih in 2008. In 2010, the species was first found in the Emirate of Umm Al Quwain, The first example to be identified in the Emirate of Abu Dhabi was first discovered in 2013 living in the Al Wathba Wetland Reserve. It has been designated as being common across the country.
