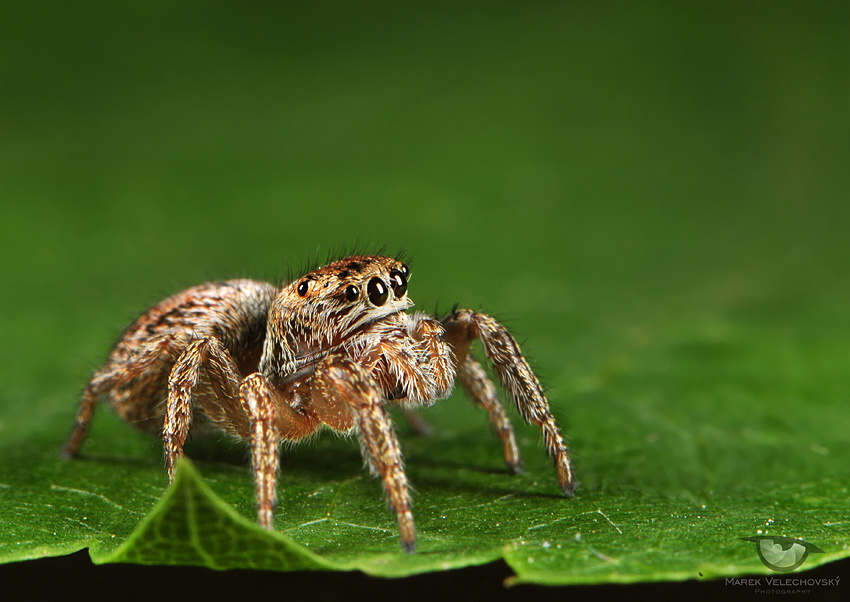
- The related Evarcha arcuata

Scientific classification
- Kingdom: Animalia
- Phylum: Arthropoda
- Subphylum: Chelicerata
- Class: Arachnida
- Order: Araneae
- Infraorder: Araneomorphae
- Family: Salticidae
- Genus: Evarcha
- Species: E. arabica

Binomial name
- Evarcha arabica Wesołowska & van Harten, 2007

Synonyms
- Evawes arabica (Wesolowska & van Harten, 2007)

= Evarcha arabica =

Species of spider

Evarcha arabica is a species of jumping spider in the genus Evarcha that lives in Yemen. The species was first described in 2007 by Wanda Wesołowska and Antonius van Harten. The spider is small, with a carapace that measures between 2.1 and 2.7 mm (0.08 and 0.11 in) long and an abdomen that is between 1.8 and 3.2 mm (0.07 and 0.13 in) long. The female is generally larger and lighter than the male. The spider's eye field is darker. The top of the male abdomen is blackish-brown with a pattern of white dots and a large yellowish-orange belt. The top of the female abdomen has similar white dots but is mainly yellow with small darker dots. The male's legs are brown and yellow while the female's are orange to yellow. It has distinctive copulatory organs. The female has accessory glands near the copulatory openings and simple bean-like spermathecae. The male has a thin embolus and a tibial apophysis that has a forked tip.

== Taxonomy ==
Evarcha arabica is a species of jumping spider that was first described by Wanda Wesołowska and Antonius van Harten in 2007. It was one of over 500 species identified by the Polish arachnologist Wesołowska during her career, making her one of the most prolific in the field. They allocated it to the genus Evarcha, first circumscribed by Eugène Simon in 1902. The genus is one of the largest, with members found on four continents.

In 1976, Jerzy Prószyński placed the genus Evarcha in the subfamily Pelleninae, along with the genera Bianor and Pellenes. In Wayne Maddison's 2015 study of spider phylogenetic classification, the genus Evarcha was moved to the subtribe Plexippina. This is a member of the tribe Plexippini, in the subclade Simonida in the clade Saltafresia. It is closely related to the genera Hyllus and Plexippus. Analysis of protein-coding genes showed it was particularly related to Telamonia. In the following year, Prószyński added the genus to a group of genera named Evarchines, named after the genus, along with Hasarinella and Nigorella based on similarities in the spiders' copulatory organs.

Prószyński placed the spider in a new genus Evawes in 2018 based on its copulatory organs and the way that they differ from other Evarcha spiders. The new genus name is a combination of Evacha and Wesołowska. This designation is not widely accepted and the species remains in the Evarcha genus in the World Spider Catalog.The species is named for the Arabian Peninsula, where it lives.

== Description ==
Evarcha arabica is a small, light-coloured spider with looks that are typical for the genus. The spider's body is divided into two main parts: a cephalothorax and an abdomen. The male has a carapace, the hard upper part of the cephalothorax, that is between 21 and 2.5 mm (0.83 and 0.10 in) long and 1.7 and 1.9 mm (0.07 and 0.07 in) wide. It is rather high, dark with a brownish-orange area towards the front and darker sides. There is a scattering of whit hairs visible. It has a nearly-black eye field with small reddish-orange scales around the eyes themselves. Tiny brown and orange hairs cover the eye field. The underside of the cephalothorax, or sternum, is dark yellow. The spider's face, or clypeus, is low and brown. Its mouthparts are distinctive. The chelicerae and labium are brown, which contrasts with the lighter brown maxillae with their pale yellow inner sides.

The male spider's abdomen is an oval that is narrower than the carapace. It measures between 1.8 and 2.5 mm (0.07 and 0.10 in) in length and having a width of between 1.2 and 1.6 mm (0.05 and 0.06 in). The top is generally blackish-brown with a pattern that consists of a large, wide and yellowish-orange belt in the middle, irregular in shape, and either one or two pairs of white spots towards the sides to the rear. It is hairless apart from a scattering of long brown hairs. The underside is often plain and dark although some examples are marked with three long dark streaks and yellowish translucent guanine crystals, which are iridescent. The spider has brown spinnerets. Its legs are brown and yellow with very dense dark hairs and long spines. The pedipalp is brown with white hairs on the cymbium and joints.

The female is larger than the male, with an abdomen between 2.1 and 3.2 mm (0.08 and 0.13 in) long and 1.5 and 2.3 mm (0.06 and 0.09 in) wide, and a carapace that is between 2.3 and 2.7 mm (0.09 and 0.11 in) long and 1.6 and 2.2 mm (0.06 and 0.09 in) wide. It is generally lighter than the male. For example, although the eye field is still darker, the carapace is yellowish-orange to light brown. It is hairy, the hairs being brown on the carapace and grey on the eye field. There are black rings around the eyes themselves. The underside of the cephalothorax is light yellow. The mouthparts are also yellow and there are dark brown hairs on the maxillae. The top of the abdomen has one or two white patches similar to the male but otherwise differs markedly. It is mainly yellow with a hint of grey, sometimes with darker sides, with an irregular pattern of small darker dots marking its surface. The underside also has a number of dark dots on a light background but also features and brownish line that stretches from near the front to near the back. The spinnerets are yellowish-grey. The legs and pedipalps are orange to yellow with brown hairs and spines.

The spider has distinctive copulatory organs. The male has a flat and rhomboid palpal bulb, with a large bulbous protrusion at its base and rounded sides. The embolus is relatively long and thin. The palpal tibia has a smaller number of long hairs and has a large straight protrusion, or tibial apophysis, that also has a forked end. It is the shape of the tip of the tibial apophysis that most helps distinguish the species from the otherwise similar Evarcha chubbi. The female has a shallow depression in the middle of its epigyne. The copulatory openings are two pockets to the rear near the epigastric furrow, and accessory glands open into the insemination ducts very close to the surface. The ducts lead to simple bean-shaped spermathecae, or receptacles, that consist of a single loop. They have very thick walls. The design of the spermathecae is simpler than others in the genus. It is similar to the related Evarcha certa and Evarcha ignea, but the ducts are longer and wider.

== Distribution ==
Evarcha spiders live across the world, although those found in North America may be accidental migrants. Evarcha arabica is endemic to Yemen. The holotype was discovered in 2001 near Hammam 'Ali. Other examples were found locally.
