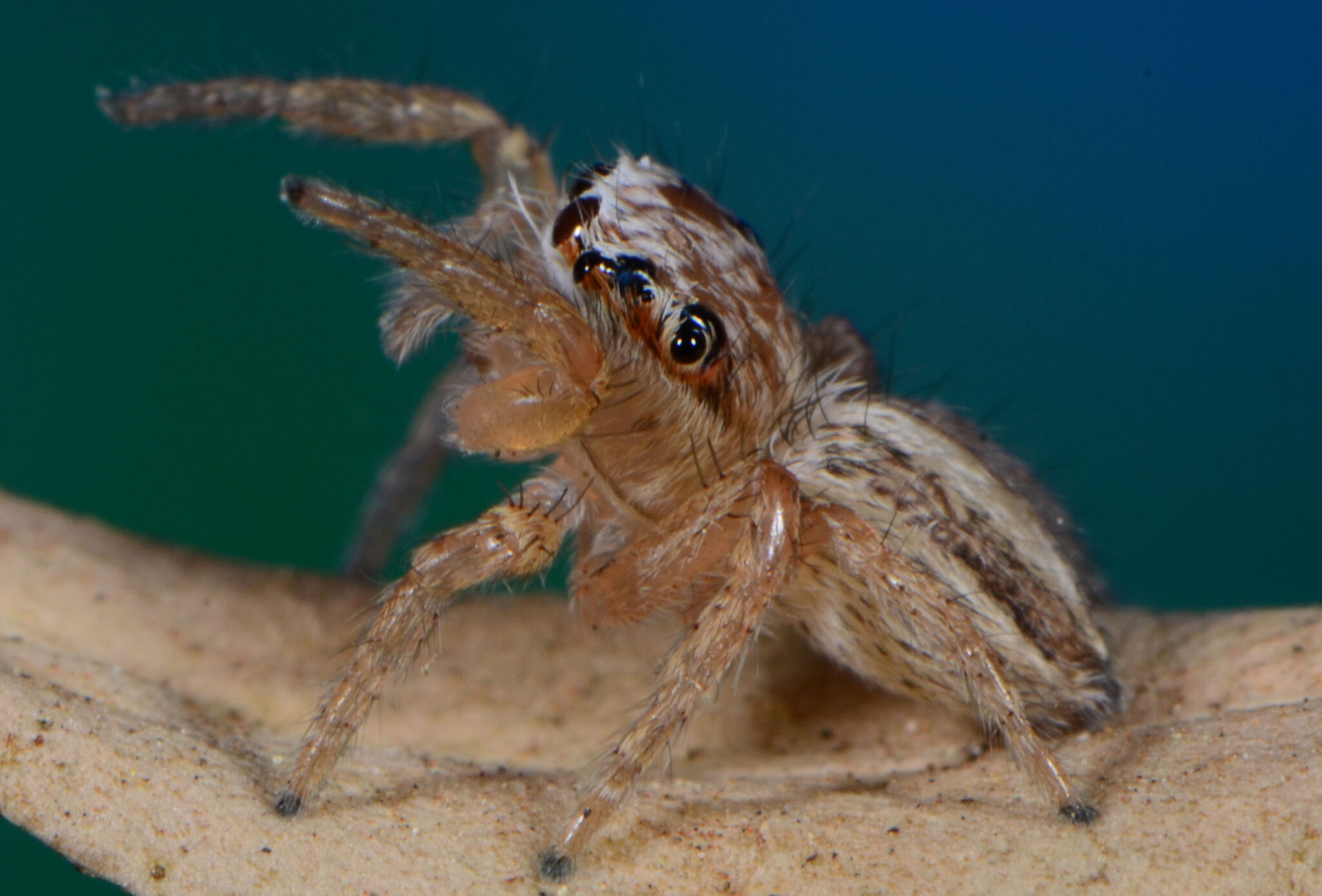
- An adult female in the Groenkloof Nature Reserve, South Africa
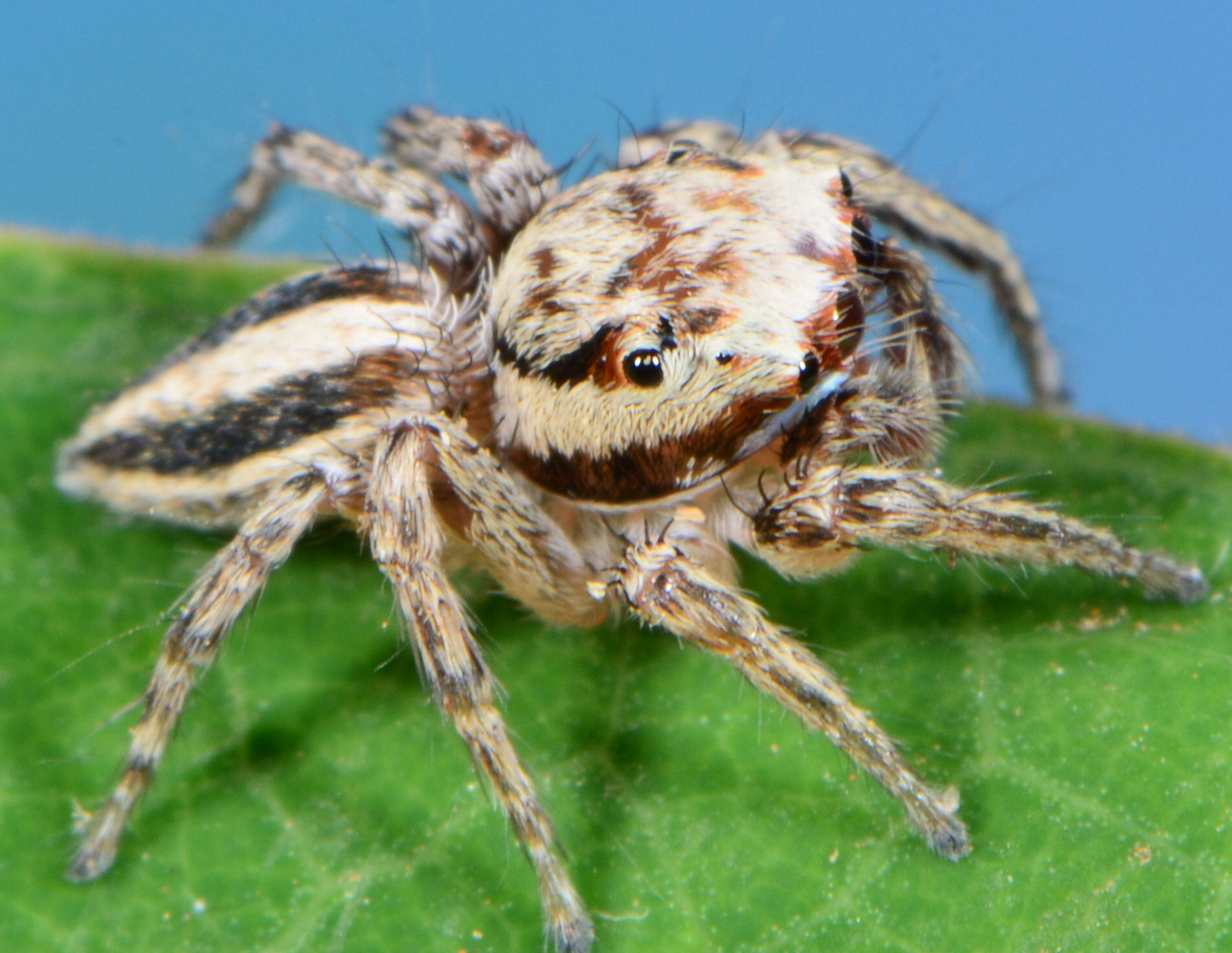
- An adult male in the same reserve

Scientific classification
- Kingdom: Animalia
- Phylum: Arthropoda
- Subphylum: Chelicerata
- Class: Arachnida
- Order: Araneae
- Infraorder: Araneomorphae
- Family: Salticidae
- Genus: Evarcha
- Species: E. flagellaris

Binomial name
- Evarcha flagellaris Haddad & Wesołowska, 2011

Synonyms
- Evacin flagellaris Haddad & Wesołowska, 2011

= Evarcha flagellaris =

Species of spider

Evarcha flagellaris is a species of jumping spider in the genus Evarcha that lives in Ghana, Kenya, South Africa and Zimbabwe. First described in 2011 by Charles R. Haddad and Wanda Wesołowska, the spider is small, with a front section, or carapace, measuring between 2.0 and 2.4 mm (0.08 and 0.09 in) long and, behind that, an abdomen that is between 1.9 and 3.6 mm (0.07 and 0.14 in) long. The female is larger than the male, particularly in the size of its abdomen. Both have stripes on their abdomens, the male being more distinct with four brown stripes contrasting with a yellow background. This is similar to the related Evarcha striolata, from which it can be distinguished by the presence of an orange shield, or scutum. It can also be identified by its copulatory organs. The female has very wide looping insemination ducts that lead to heavily sclerotized multi-chambered spermathecae. The male has a long straight projection from its tibia, or tibial apophysis, and a whip-like embolus. It is after the latter feature that it is named.

== Taxonomy ==
Evarcha flagellaris is a species of jumping spider, a member of the family Salticidae, that was first described by the arachnologists Charles R. Haddad and Wanda Wesołowska in 2011. It was one of over 500 species identified by the Polish scientist Wesołowska during her career, making her one of the most prolific in the field. They allocated it to the genus Evarcha, first circumscribed by French naturalist Eugène Simon in 1902. The genus is one of the largest, with members found on four continents.

In 1976, Polish arachnologist Jerzy Prószyński placed the genus in the subfamily Pelleninae, along with the genera Bianor and Pellenes. In Australian biologist Wayne Maddison's 2015 study of spider phylogenetic classification, the genus Evarcha was moved to the subtribe Plexippina. This is a member of the tribe Plexippini, in the subclade Simonida in the clade Saltafresia. It is closer to the genera Hyllus and Plexippus. Analysis of protein-coding genes showed it was particularly related to Telamonia. In the following year, Prószyński added the genus to a group of genera named Evarchines, named after the genus, along with Hasarinella and Nigorella based on similarities in the spiders' copulatory organs.

Prószyński placed the spider in a new genus Evacin in 2018 based on its similarity to Evarcha striolata and difference from other Evarcha spiders. This designation is not widely accepted and the species remains in the Evarcha genus in the World Spider Catalog. The species is named for a Latin word for a whip and recalls the shape of the male embolus.

== Description ==
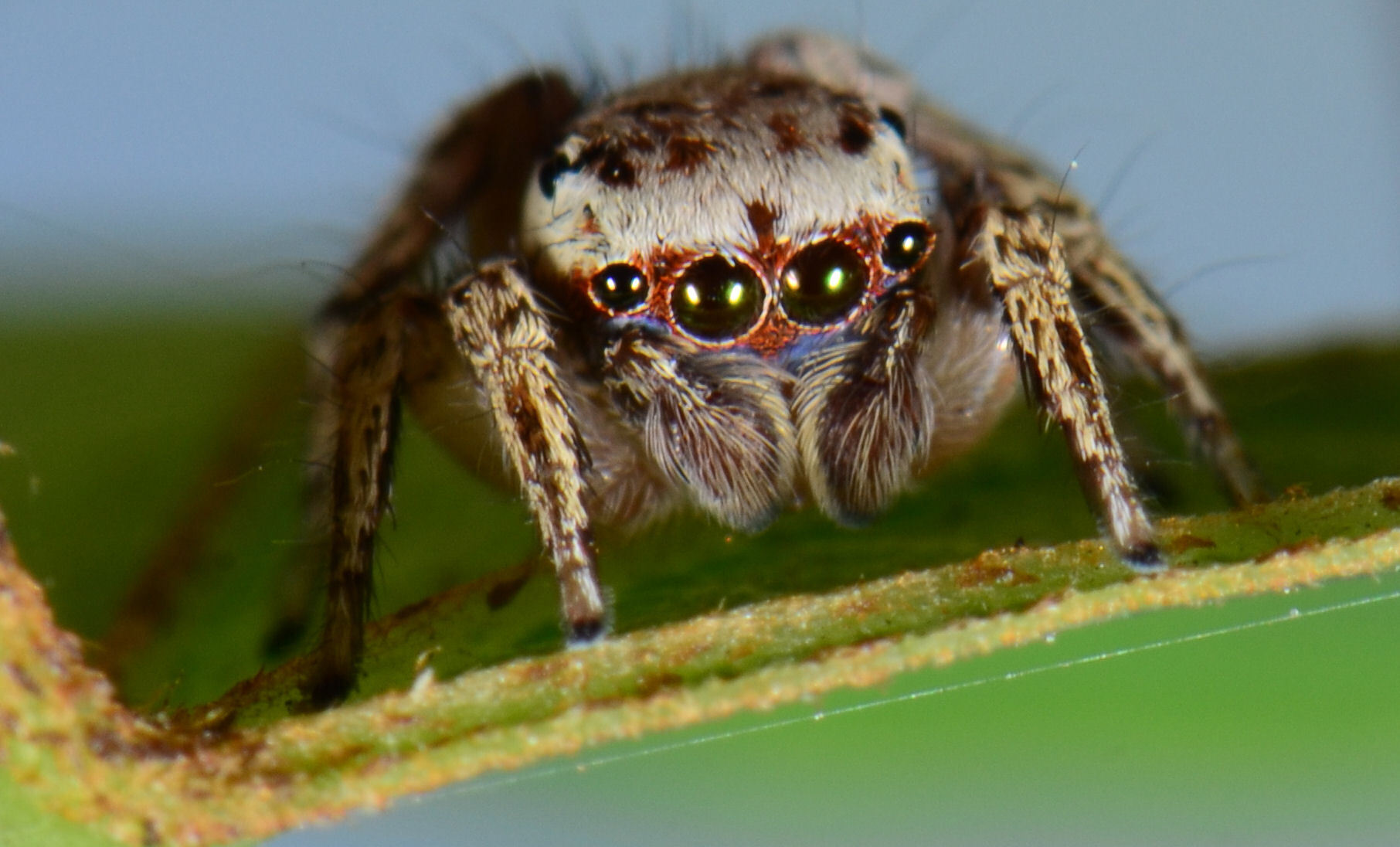
A frontal view of a male Evarcha flagellaris

Evarcha flagellaris is small with features that are typical for the genus. The male has a carapace that is between 2.0 and 2.1 mm (0.08 and 0.08 in) long and 1.5 and 1.6 mm (0.06 and 0.06 in) wide. It is oval, high and sloping. The top is brown with an indistinct lighter streak in the middle, to the rear of which can be found dark patches made up of brown hairs. The eye field is black with white hairs at the front. White hairs can also be found on the spider's face or clypeus. The underside, or sternum, is yellow. The mouthparts are distinctive with light brown chelicerae, yellow labium and yellow maxillae.

The male spider's abdomen is smaller than its carapace, measuring between 1.9 and 2.0 mm (0.07 and 0.08 in) in length and having a width of typically 1.2 mm (0.05 in). It is yellow on top with four brown stripes. The front portion is covered with an orange scutum fringed with thick brown bristles at the rear. The underside is pale. The spider has grey spinnerets. The yellow legs have dark stripes, brown hairs, and many spines. The copulatory organs are distinctive. The pedipalp has a long straight projection from its tibia called a tibial apophysis. The palpal bulb is rounded with a bulge sticking out of the middle and a very long whip-like embolus with a slightly kinked end.

The female is slightly larger than the male, with a carapace that is between 2.3 and 2.4 mm (0.09 and 0.09 in) long and 1.7 and 1.8 mm (0.07 and 0.07 in) wide and a substantially larger abdomen that is 3.3 and 3.6 mm (0.13 and 0.14 in) long and 2.3 and 2.4 mm (0.09 and 0.09 in) wide. The carapace is paler than the male's, with the majority of the top yellow or light brown and the underside dark yellow. Some brown bristles can be seen, with whitish hairs visible near the eyes, which are surrounded by black rings. The clypeus is low and has a scattering of hairs. The mouthparts are dark yellow.

The female abdomen is a yellowish-white ovoid with a similar, but less distinct pattern to the male. There are two beige stripes down the centre, lines of dark patches on the sides, and a few brown bristles scattered on the top. It lacks the scutum on the male. The underside is whitish and marked with two lines of beige dots. The spinnerets are light with grey tips. The spider's legs are yellow to orange with light brown hairs and spines. The copulatory organs are once again distinctive. It has two rounded, widely separated grooves on its epigyne and a very wide pocket at epigastric fold at the very rear of the spider. The copulatory openings lead to slightly-sclerotized and very wide insemination ducts that form a small series of loops on their way to the heavily sclerotized spermathecae or receptacles. These spermathecae are formed of many chambers.

The species is similar to the related Evarcha striolata, differing in the presence of the scutum on the male abdomen and the shape of the carapace. The male has a shorter embolus and has a characteristic lump on the palpal bulb. The female is very similar to Evarcha elegans. The male differs from the otherwise similar Evarcha karas in its narrow and pointed tibial apophysis and the way that it does not touch the embolus.

== Distribution and habitat ==
Evarcha spiders live across the world, although those found in North America may be accidental migrants. The genus is found across Africa. Evarcha flagellaris lives in Ghana, Kenya, South Africa and Zimbabwe. The male holotype for the species was found in the Erfenis Dam Nature Reserve in Free State in 2009. Examples have also been found across the state in Willem Pretorius Game Reserve. Other specimens have been collected in the Rustenburg Nature Reserve, North West, within the Magaliesberg Biosphere Reserve in 1977 and 1980 and near Winterton, KwaZulu-Natal, in 2007. The first example to be found in Kenya was discovered on the east slope of Mount Elgon in 1948 at an altitude of 2,050 m (6,730 ft) above sea level. It is only found in Trans-Nzoia County in the country.

The spider thrives in grasslands and woodlands. The holotype was found amongst Vachellia karroo trees. Other examples have been found in open fields, such as the edges of a plantation of kenaf crops.
