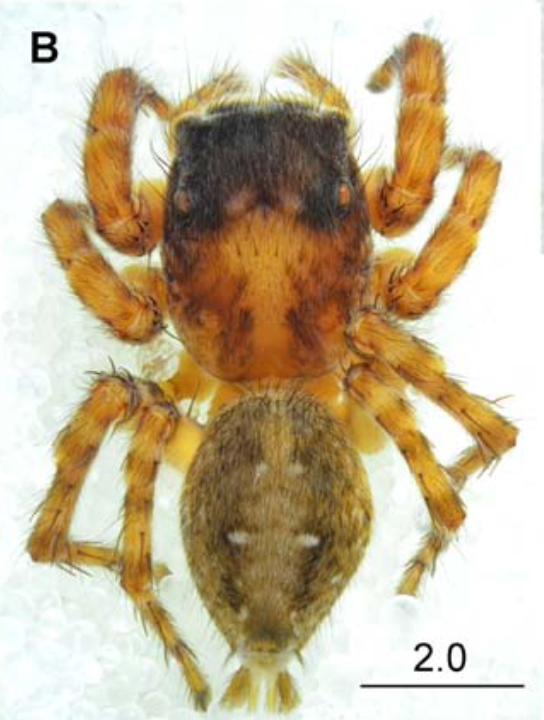
- Female adult from Ivory Coast

Scientific classification
- Kingdom: Animalia
- Phylum: Arthropoda
- Subphylum: Chelicerata
- Class: Arachnida
- Order: Araneae
- Infraorder: Araneomorphae
- Family: Salticidae
- Genus: Evarcha
- Species: E. zougoussi

Binomial name
- Evarcha zougoussi Wesołowska & Russell-Smith, 2022

= Evarcha zougoussi =

Species of jumping spider

Evarcha zougoussi is a species of jumping spider that lives in Ivory Coast. A member of the genus Evarcha, the species was first described in 2022 by Wanda Wesołowska and Anthony Russell-Smith. It is a comparatively large spider, with an oval cephalothorax measuring between 2.7 and 3.3 mm (0.11 and 0.13 in) long and an ovoid abdomen between 3 and 3.5 mm (0.12 and 0.14 in) long. It has a pattern of a light streak down its carapace, the top of its cephalothorax, and a series of spots on its abdomen. In comparison, the spider's sternum, or underside of the cephalothorax, is a plain yellow. Its legs are generally light brown. Although only the female has been identified, it is clear that the spider's copulatory organs are distinctive, including the existence of a deep pocket in its epigyne and its bean-shaped spermathecae.

== Taxonomy ==
Evarcha zougoussi is a species of jumping spider, a member of the family Salticidae, that was first described by the arachnologists Wanda Wesołowska and Anthony Russell-Smith in 2022. It was one of over 500 species identified by Wesołowska during her career, making her one of the most prolific in the field. Despite reservations, mainly due to the unusually large size of the spider, they allocated it to the genus Evarcha rather than Hyllus. The species is named for the place where it was first found.

First circumscribed by Eugène Simon in 1902, Evarcha is one of the largest genera of jumping spiders, with members found on four continents. In 1976, Jerzy Prószyński placed the genus in the subfamily Pelleninae, along with the genera Bianor and Pellenes. In Wayne Maddison's 2015 study of spider phylogenetic classification, the genus Evarcha was moved to the subtribe Plexippina. This is a member of the tribe Plexippini, in the subclade Simonida in the clade Saltafresia. It is closer to the genera Hyllus and Plexippus. Analysis of protein-coding genes showed it was particularly related to Telamonia. In the following year, Prószyński added the genus to a group of genera named Evarchines, named after the genus, along with Hasarinella and Nigorella based on similarities in the spiders' copulatory organs. In 2018, Prószyński attempted to split the genus, but this has proved controversial and has not been universally accepted.

== Description ==
Evarcha zougoussi is a comparative large spider. The spider's body is divided into two main parts: a rather rounded oval cephalothorax and an ovoid abdomen that is shaped more like a tear-drop. The female has a cephalothorax that is between 2.7 and 3.3 mm (0.11 and 0.13 in) long and 2.4 and 2.8 mm (0.09 and 0.11 in) wide. The carapace, the hard upper part of the cephalothorax, is dark brown with a lighter streak down the middle and covered in dense brown hairs. The eye field is blackish with white scales, small white spots and long brown bristles around the eyes themselves. The underside, or sternum, is yellow. The spider's mouthparts, including its labium and maxillae, are brown. The chelicerae have a single tooth.

The spider's abdomen is between 3 and 3.5 mm (0.12 and 0.14 in) long and 2.2 and 2.6 mm (0.09 and 0.10 in) wide. It is greyish-brown on top, which is darker to the edges, with a pattern of six white spots in two lines. It is covered in dense brown hairs and occasional long brown bristles. The underside is yellow with a large dark grey spot to the back. The spinnerets are mainly grey with yellow areas to the rear. The spider's legs are light brown with darker markings. They are covered in brown hairs and spines.

The spider's copulatory organs help to distinguish the species from others in the genus. The epigyne have deep pockets at the front and two copulatory openings placed at its edges. There are areas of sclerotization on the depressions. The openings lead to short insemination ducts and bean-shaped spermathecae, or receptacles. Its epigyne is very similar to the related Evarcha pinguis, including its internal structure. but differ in the shape of the depressions in the spider's epigyne. The male has not been described.

== Distribution and habitat ==
Evarcha spiders live across the world, although those found in North America may be accidental migrants. Although the genus is found across Africa, Evarcha zougoussi is endemic to Ivory Coast. The female holotype was found in near the village of Zougoussi. The village is situated in the Lamto study area, which is about 180 km (110 mi) north of Abidjan at the edge of the savanna. The spider lives in the savanna amongst tall grass.
