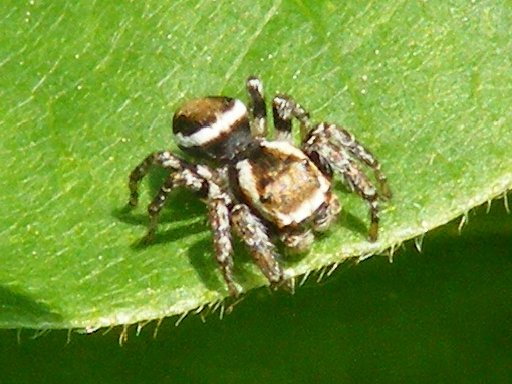
- The related Evarcha hoyi

Scientific classification
- Kingdom: Animalia
- Phylum: Arthropoda
- Subphylum: Chelicerata
- Class: Arachnida
- Order: Araneae
- Infraorder: Araneomorphae
- Family: Salticidae
- Genus: Evarcha
- Species: E. pinguis

Binomial name
- Evarcha pinguis Wesołowska & Tomasiewicz, 2008

Synonyms
- Evawes pinguis (Wesołowska & Tomasiewicz, 2008)

= Evarcha pinguis =

Species of spider

Evarcha pinguis is a species of jumping spider in the genus Evarcha that lives in Ethiopia. The species was first described in 2008 by Wanda Wesołowska and Beata Tomasiewicz. The spider is larger than others in the genus, with a cephalothorax measuring 3.4 mm (0.13 in) long and an abdomen between 4.7 mm (0.19 in) long. The spider is dark brown and hairy apart from a lighter streak on the back of the carapace and a pattern of light chevrons down the back of the abdomen. The legs are brown, the front four being thicker and shorter than the rest. The copulatory organs are distinctive. The female has marked sclerotization to the edge of its epigyne. The male has not been described.

== Taxonomy ==
Evarcha pinguis is a species of jumping spider that was first described by Wanda Wesołowska and Beata Tomasiewicz in 2008. It was one of over 500 species identified by the Polish arachnologist Wesołowska during her career, making her one of the most prolific in the field. Despite reservations, mainly due to the unusually large size of the spider, they allocated it to the genus Evarcha rather than Hyllus. The species is named for a Latin word that can be translated "corpulent".

First circumscribed by Eugène Simon in 1902, Evarcha is one of the largest genera of jumping spiders, with members found on four continents. In 1976, Jerzy Prószyński placed the genus in the subfamily Pelleninae, along with the genera Bianor and Pellenes. In Wayne Maddison's 2015 study of spider phylogenetic classification, the genus Evarcha was moved to the subtribe Plexippina. This is a member of the tribe Plexippini, in the subclade Simonida in the clade Saltafresia. It is closer to the genera Hyllus and Plexippus. Analysis of protein-coding genes showed it was particularly related to Telamonia. In the following year, Prószyński added the genus to a group of genera named Evarchines, named after the genus, along with Hasarinella and Nigorella based on similarities in the spiders' copulatory organs.

Prószyński placed the spider in a new genus Evawes in 2018 based on its copulatory organs and the way that they differ from other Evarcha spiders. The new genus name is a combination of Evacha and Wesołowska. This designation is not widely accepted and the species remains in the Evarcha genus in the World Spider Catalog.

== Description ==
Evarcha pinguis is a large dark and hairy spider. The spider's body is divided into two main parts: a rather round cephalothorax and an abdomen that is shaped more like a tear-drop. The female has a cephalothorax that is typically 3.4 mm (0.13 in) long and 2.9 mm (0.11 in) wide. The carapace, the hard upper part of the cephalothorax, is oval and dark brown with a lighter streak down the middle. There is a scattering of long brown hairs and a dense covering of short grey hairs all over the carapace, the grey hairs even denser on the eye field. The eyes are surrounded by small greyish scales and long bristles. The underside, or sternum, is dark brown with a light centre. The spider's face, or clypeus, is covered in white hairs that also form streaks beneath the outermost eyes. The chelicerae are dark brown. It has a single tooth.

The spider's abdomen is typically 4.7 mm (0.19 in) long and 3.3 mm (0.13 in) wide. It is dark brown with a pattern of greyish chevron-like patches making a line down the centre. The front patches make a stretched V-shape. There is a covering of short dark hairs interspersed with a few long brown and grey hairs. The underside is dark. The spinnerets are brown, as are the legs. The front four legs are shorter and thicker than the rest. All are covered in long brown and greyish hairs. They also have numerous spines.

As well as the spider's large size, the copulatory organs help to distinguish the species from others in the genus. The epigyne has large rounded depression that are partially plugged by a waxy secretion. The edges have noticeable sclerotization. Towards the sides are two copulatory openings that lead to simple copulatory ducts and relatively small and simple spermathecae. This internal structure is very similar to the related Evarcha zougoussi. It is the strongly sclerotization on the epigyne that helps differentiate the species. The male has not been identified.

== Distribution and habitat ==
Evarcha spiders live across the world, although those found in North America may be accidental migrants. Although the genus is found across Africa, Evarcha pinguis is endemic to Ethiopia. The holotype was found in near Hora Crater Lake, Debre Zeit, in 1987 at an altitude of 1,900 m (6,200 ft) above sea level. The spider lives amongst tall grass.
