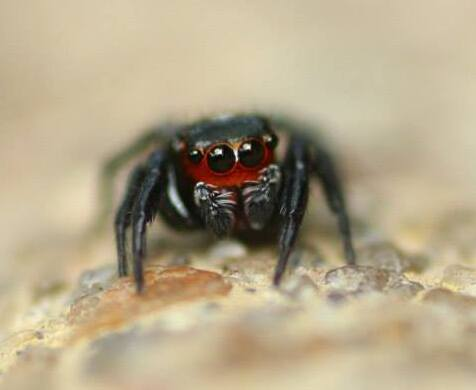
- Evarcha ignea spotted in 2014 in South Africa

Scientific classification
- Kingdom: Animalia
- Phylum: Arthropoda
- Subphylum: Chelicerata
- Class: Arachnida
- Order: Araneae
- Infraorder: Araneomorphae
- Family: Salticidae
- Genus: Evarcha
- Species: E. ignea

Binomial name
- Evarcha ignea Wesołowska & Cumming, 2008

Synonyms
- Evawes ignea (Wesołowska & Cumming, 2008)

= Evarcha ignea =

Species of spider

Evarcha ignea is a species of jumping spider in the genus Evarcha that is endemic to Africa. The male spider's face, or clypeus, is covered in bright scarlet scale-like hairs, which gives the spider its species name, which can be translated "fiery". It is ground-dwelling spider, living in leaf litter, but has also been observed living on the walls of houses. First discovered living in Zimbabwe, it has been found to have a wide distribution that also includes Nigeria and South Africa. A small spider, it has a rounded cephalothorax that is usually between 1.9 and 2.5 mm (0.07 and 0.10 in) long and an ovoid abdomen that is between 1.6 and 2.2 mm (0.06 and 0.09 in) long. The female is slightly larger than the male. The male has a mostly dark brown carapace and russet-brown abdomen, while the female's carapace is whitish-yellow and abdomen creamy. To distinguish this species from others in the genus, it is necessary to compare their copulatory organs. The male Evarcha ignea has a distinctive small notch on the spike, or apophysis on its reproductive organs. The female has shorter insemination ducts than other species, and spermathecae that have a large first chamber. The male of species was first described in 2008 by Wanda Wesołowska and Meg Cumming and the female described the year after.

== Taxonomy ==
Evarcha ignea is a species of jumping spider that was first described by Wanda Wesołowska and Meg Cumming in 2008. Initially only the male was described; a description of the female was first published by Wesołowska and Charles Haddad in 2009. They allocated it to the genus Evarcha, first circumscribed by Eugène Simon in 1902. The genus is one of the largest, with members found on four continents. The species is named for a Latin word that can be translated "fiery", and points to the spider's face, or clypeus.

In 1976, Jerzy Prószyński placed the genus was placed in the subfamily Pelleninae, along with the genera Bianor and Pellenes. In Wayne Maddison's 2015 study of spider phylogenetic classification, the genus Evarcha was moved to the subtribe Plexippina. This is a member of the tribe Plexippini, in the subclade Simonida in the clade Saltafresia. In the following year, Prószyński added the genus to a group of genera named Evarchines, named after the genus, along with Hasarinella and Nigorella based on similarities in the spiders' copulatory organs.

Prószyński placed the spider in a new genus Evawes in 2018 based on its copulatory organs and the way that they differ from other Evarcha spiders. The new genus name is a combination of Evacha and "Wesołowska". This designation is not widely accepted and the species remains in the Evarcha genus in the World Spider Catalog.

== Description ==
Evarcha ignea is a small spider. The spider's body is divided into two main parts: a rectangular, slightly rounded cephalothorax and larger ovoid abdomen that is narrower to the rear. The male has a carapace, the hard upper part of the cephalothorax, that is between 1.9 and 2.3 mm (0.07 and 0.09 in) long and 1.5 and 1.8 mm (0.06 and 0.07 in) wide. It is generally dark brown with a brown streak down the middle and a thin black line at the edges. The eye field is black. There is a patch of white hairs at the back of the eye field, with more scattered on the carapace, and long brown hairs close to the eyes themselves. There are orange scales near some of the eyes. The underside of the cephalothorax, or sternum, is yellow, with a tint of grey. The clypeus is high and covered in bright scarlet scale-like hairs, the brightness of which give the spider its name. The spider's mouthparts, including the labium, are generally brown. The chelicerae have a single tooth.

The male spider's abdomen is between 1.6 and 2.2 mm (0.06 and 0.09 in) long and 1.1 and 1.4 mm (0.04 and 0.06 in) wide. It is russet-coloured on top with a yellowish pattern of pale chevrons at the back. A covering of long dark hairs adorns the surface, which are longer and denser to the front edge. On some individuals, the abdomen has a light patch, and in others it had a small delicate orange scutum. The underside is usually grey, but in some individuals it is yellow with a pattern of dark dots making three lines. The spinnerets are yellowish-grey. It has legs that are mainly brown, although the tarsi are yellow and there are lighter rings visible on some of the joints. The front legs are longer than the others. The legs have brown hairs and long spines. The pedipalps, sensory organs near the mouth, are dark.

The male's copulatory organs are distinctive. The palpal tibia has a wide protrusion, or tibial apophysis, that has an end with a small notch which accentuates its sharp tip. The palpal bulb is rhomboid with a large bulbous protrusion at its base. There is a very thin embolus emanating from near the top of the bulb that hugs the top of the bulb. The cymbium is rather large. It is the shape of the copulatory organs that help distinguish the spider from others in the genus. For example, the related Evarcha bakorensis has a similar clypeus, but its tibial apophysis is blunt and lacks the small notch that is characteristic of this species. Conversely, both Evarcha acuta and Evarcha amanzi have a larger notch.

The female is slightly larger in comparison to the male, with a cephalothorax that is typically 2.5 mm (0.10 in) long, and 1.9 mm (0.07 in) wide and an ovoid abdomen that is 2.2 mm (0.09 in) in length and 1.6 mm (0.06 in) in width. It is similar in proportion but generally paler than the male. The carapace is whitish-yellow and the eye field is grey. The pattern consists of a large light chevron on the rear of the eye field and a thin belt formed of brown hairs that follows the border around the top and the sides. There are black rings round the eyes themselves, some of which are surrounded by white hairs. The underside is light and without a pattern. The clypeus is low and yellow, less bright than the male's. The mouthparts, including the chelicerae, are also lighter than the male's. The abdomen is creamy with a covering of brown hairs.

The female's epigyne has copulatory openings to the rear; it is similar to the related Evarcha arabica and Evarcha certa, particularly in its internal structure. However, the insemination ducts are small while spermathecae's first chamber is larger.

== Distribution and habitat ==
Evarcha spiders live across the world, although those found in North America may be accidental migrants. Evarcha ignea is endemic to Africa. It lives in Nigeria, South Africa and Zimbabwe. The male holotype was discovered in a house in Zimbabwe in 1999. Retrospectively, it was also recognised as living in Nigeria, the first instance being in Cross River State in 1984, when two males were seen, one in the village of Akim Akim and another in Calabar. The first example to be identified in South Africa was found in the Ndumo Game Reserve in 2005. Up to this point, all the spiders discovered had been male. The first female was found in Tembe Elephant Park in KwaZulu-Natal, South Africa, approximately 15 kilometres (9.3 mi) east of the first South African find. A male was found at the same time, confirming their identity.

The spider lives in a range of environments. It is ground-dwelling, and often lives in leaf litter found on the floor of forests and savanna. It seems to thrive in forests of Senegalia nigrescens trees. The spider has also been found living in the bark of Commiphora harveyi trees. The species also seems to live in areas of human habitation. The holotype was found climbing a kitchen wall and may have lived on a farm. Its conservation status is considered of least concern.

== Bibliography ==
- Dippenaar-Schoeman, Ansie (2014). Field Guide to South African Spiders. Pretoria: LAPA Publishers. ISBN 978-0-7993-6018-9.
- Dippenaar-Schoeman, Ansie S.; Foord, Stefan H.; Haddad, Charles R. (2021). "A list of spider species found in the Marakele National Park, Limpopo Province, South Africa (Arachnida: Araneae)". SANSA Newsletter (37): 9–15.
- Haddad, Charles R.; Wesołowska, Wanda (2013). "Additions to the jumping spider fauna of South Africa (Araneae: Salticidae)" (PDF). Genus. 24 (3–4): 459–501. Archived from the original (PDF) on 4 March 2023.
- Kropf, Christian; Blick, Theo; Brescovit, Antonio D.; Chatzaki, Maria; Dupérré, Nadine; Gloor, Daniel; Haddad, Charles R.; Harvey, Mark S.; Jäger, Peter; Marusik, Yuri M.; Ono, Hirotsugu; Rheims, Cristina A.; Nentwig, Wolfgang (2019). "How not to delimit taxa: a critique on a recently proposed "pragmatic classification" of jumping spiders (Arthropoda: Arachnida: Araneae: Salticidae)". Zootaxa. 4545 (3): 444–446. doi:10.11646/zootaxa.4545.3.10. PMID 30790913.
- Maddison, Wayne P. (2015). "A phylogenetic classification of jumping spiders (Araneae: Salticidae)". The Journal of Arachnology. 43 (3): 231–292. doi:10.1636/arac-43-03-231-292. S2CID 85680279.
- Maddison, Wayne P .; Hedin, Marshal C. (2003). "Jumping spider phylogeny (Araneae: Salticidae)". Invertebrate Systematics. 17 (4): 529–549. doi:10.1071/IS02044.
- Prószyński, Jerzy (2017). "Pragmatic classification of the World's Salticidae (Araneae)". Ecologica Montenegrina. 12: 1–133. doi:10.37828/em.2017.12.1.
- Prószyński, Jerzy (2018). "Review of genera Evarcha and Nigorella, with comments on Emertonius, Padilothorax [sic], Stagetillus, and description of five new genera and two new species (Araneae: Salticidae)". Ecologica Montenegrina. 16: 130–179. doi:10.37828/em.2018.16.12.
- Wesołowska, Wanda; Cumming, Meg S. (2008). "Taxonomy and Natural History of a Species Rich Assemblage of Jumping Spiders (Araneae: Salticidae); A Long-Term Study of a Suburban Site in Zimbabwe". Annales Zoologici. 58 (1): 167–230. doi:10.3161/067.058.0108. S2CID 83575177.
- Wesołowska, Wanda; Edwards, Glavis B. (2012). "Jumping Spiders (Araneae: Salticidae) of the Calabar Area (SE Nigeria)". Annales Zoologici. 62 (4): 733–772. doi:10.3161/000345412X659786. S2CID 86538550.
- Wesołowska, Wanda; Haddad, Charles R. (2009). "Jumping spiders (Araneae: Salticidae) of the Ndumo Game Reserve, Maputaland, South Africa". African Invertebrates. 50 (1): 30–103. Bibcode:2009AfrIn..50...13W. doi:10.5733/afin.050.0102. S2CID 85322962.
- Wesołowska, Wanda; Haddad, Charles R. (2018). "Further additions to the jumping spider fauna of South Africa (Araneae: Salticidae)". Annales Zoologici. 68 (4): 879–908. doi:10.3161/00034541ANZ2018.68.4.011. S2CID 86626109.
