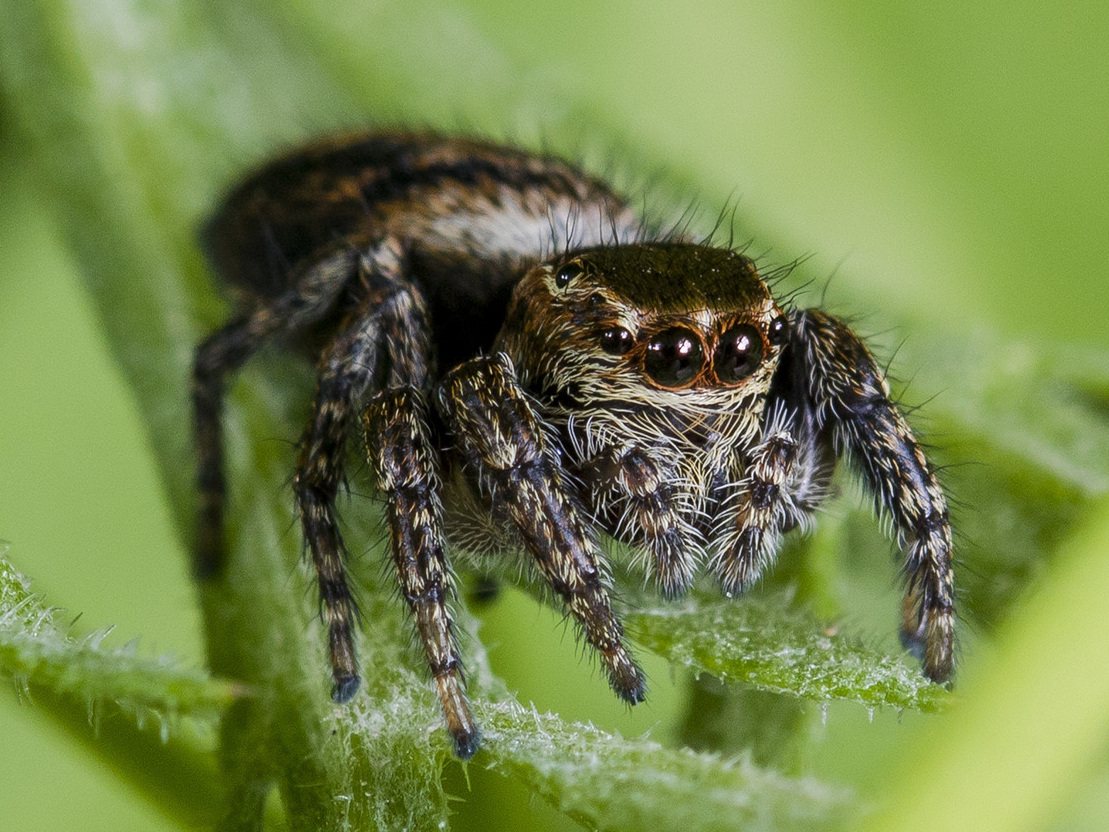
- The related Evarcha michailovi

Scientific classification
- Kingdom: Animalia
- Phylum: Arthropoda
- Subphylum: Chelicerata
- Class: Arachnida
- Order: Araneae
- Infraorder: Araneomorphae
- Family: Salticidae
- Genus: Evarcha
- Species: E. praeclara

Binomial name
- Evarcha praeclara Prószyński & Wesołowska, 2003

Synonyms
- Evaneg praeclara (Prószyński & Wesołowska, 2003)

= Evarcha praeclara =

Species of spider

Evarcha praeclara is a species of jumping spider in the genus Evarcha that lives in Iran, Israel, South Sudan, Sudan, the United Arab Emirates and Yemen. The first examples of the spider were first identified by Eugène Simon in the early twentieth century in what is now Southern Sudan, but it was not until 2003 that the species was formally described by Jerzy Prószyński and Wanda Wesołowska. The exact nature of the species is disputed, with Prószyński stating that the examples found may be a group of species rather than a single one. Those that have been described are small, with a carapace that is between 2.1 and 2.4 mm (0.08 and 0.09 in) long and an ovoid abdomen that measures between 1.7 and 3.2 mm (0.07 and 0.13 in) long. The female is generally larger than the male. They have a brown or dark brown carapace, the female being plain while the male having a pattern of creamy white spots. The pattern on the top of the abdomen varies, with some spiders having lighter patches on a russet background and others being brown and white. They are all hairy. The spiders have generally brown mouthparts. The spiders' copulatory organs are distinctive and help distinguish the species from others in the genus. The female has an unusual trapezoid-shaped depression in its epigyne. The male has a broad embolus that has a tip that hugs a very distinctive protrusion, or apophysis.

== Taxonomy ==
In 1994, the arachnologists Wanda Wesołowska and Antonius van Harten used the name Evarcha praecincta to describe a combination of the species of jumping spiders called Mogrus praecinctus and Pellenes praecinctus. The former species had been first described by Eugène Simon in 1890 and the latter by Jerzy Prószyński in 1984. The combination was based on descriptions of examples found between 1991 and 1993. Pellenes praecinctus had already been identified as a possible synonym for Mogrus praecinctus when it was first described. It was subsequently identified that neither of the examples described were members of Mogrus praecinctus after all, and that they were members of a new species. It was then found that many of the examples of Mogrus praecinctus apart from Simon's original example were members of that new species.

The new species first formally described by Prószyński and Wesołowska in 2003. Evarcha praecincta had been preoccupied so it was necessary to choose a new name for the species. It was therefore named Evarcha praeclara. The species was one of over 500 described by Wesołowska during her career. She was second only to Simon for the number of descriptions published by any arachnologist.

Prószyński and Wesołowska allocated the species to the genus Evarcha, which had been first circumscribed by Simon in 1902. The genus is one of the largest, with members found on four continents. It is closely related to the genera Hyllus and Plexippus. Analysis of protein-coding genes showed it was particularly related to Telamonia. In 1976, Prószyński placed the genus Evarcha in the subfamily Pelleninae, along with the genera Bianor and Pellenes. In Wayne Maddison's 2015 study of spider phylogenetic classification, the genus Evarcha was moved to the subtribe Plexippina. Plexippina is a member of the tribe Plexippini, in the subclade Simonida in the clade Saltafresia.

In 2016, Prószyński added the genus to a group of genera named Evarchines, named after the genus, along with Hasarinella and Nigorella based on similarities in the spiders' copulatory organs. In 2017, Prószyński named a group of 12 species in the genus the praeclara group after the species. He later went further and suggested that the diversity in the examples of the species that what had been considered a single species could be a more than one and that Evarcha praeclara may describe a group of species. In 2018, Prószyński placed the spider in a new genus Evaneg based on its copulatory organs and the way that they differ from other Evarcha spiders. The new genus name is a combination of Evacha and Evarcha negevensis, the type species for the new genus. This designation is not widely accepted and the species remains in the Evarcha genus in the World Spider Catalog.

== Description ==
Evarcha praeclara is a small, light-coloured spider. Its body is divided into two main parts: a cephalothorax and an abdomen. The male has a high carapace, the hard upper part of the cephalothorax, that is between 2.1 and 2.4 mm (0.08 and 0.09 in) long and 1.6 and 2.0 mm (0.06 and 0.08 in) wide. It is a convex oval that is generally dark brown or brown. It is marked with two wide diagonal creamy-white streaks and a scattering of brown bristles. It has a darker, nearly black, eye field with a triangular white patch divided by a thin dark line and more frequent brown bristles. There are a few white hairs around the eyes themselves, while one example also had tufts of flattened dark hair near some of the eyes that looked like horns. The underside of the cephalothorax, or sternum, is light brown or brown. The spider's face, or clypeus, has a covering of white hairs. Its mouthparts, including the chelicerae, labium and maxillae are brown. The spider has two teeth at the front and one to the back.

The male spider's abdomen is an ovoid narrower than its carapace, measuring between 1.7 and 1.8 mm (0.07 and 0.07 in) in length and having a width of between 1.1 and 1.3 mm (0.04 and 0.05 in). The pattern on its abdomen differs between examples found in Africa and Asia. Asian spiders have a white front third of the top, the remainder being generally dark brown except for a white patch in the middle. It is covered in long white and brown hairs. The sides are light while the underside is dark. African examples have a symmetrical pattern on the top of their abdomens consisting of a series of five yellowish patches on a russet background on the top or a broad triangular stripe down the middle. They are also larger, typically 1.98 mm (0.08 in) in length and 1.4 and 1.8 mm (0.06 and 0.07 in) in width.

Asian spiders have brown spinnerets and striped yellow and dark brown legs. As well many long brown spines, the legs have greyish and brown hairs. The third pair of legs from the front is longest. African examples have long dark spinnerets while the legs are yellowish-brown. They share the long brown spines with those from Asia. All the spiders have generally brown pedipalps. The male palpal tibia has long hairs and a short broad protrusion, or tibial apophysis, that has a sharp spike at its end. The cymbium and palpal bulb are round. The embolus is broad and is accompanied by a trough-like apophysis. Its tip is distinctive, being particularly sharp and hugging the apophysis, which seems to rise to meet it.

The female is larger than the male. It has a brown carapace that is between 2.5 and 2.7 mm (0.10 and 0.11 in) long and 2.1 and 2.4 mm (0.08 and 0.09 in) wide. It lacks the pattern of the male and has a coat of short dense white hairs. The eye field is nearly black with white patches, long brown bristles and tufts of dark hair near some of the eyes. The sternum is yellowish-brown with darker edges. The mouthparts are brown, except the tip of the labium and inside of the maxillae, which are lighter brown.

The female abdomen measures between 2.5 and 3.2 mm (0.10 and 0.13 in) long and 1.9 and 2.4 mm (0.07 and 0.09 in) wide. It has a russet top marked with a lighter irregular stripe that runs from the front to back and a covering of light greyish and brown hairs. The underside has a grey stripe, but is otherwise yellow. The spinnerets are greyish-brown. The legs are similar to the male. The female epigyne has two pockets that flank a central depression that is shaped like a trapezium. It is larger in some examples than in others. The copulatory openings lead to thin insemination ducts that have slight sclerotization. The spermathecae, or receptacles, have many chambers.

The copulatory organs help identify the species, and tell it apart from other species in the genus. It is closely related to Evarcha negevensis, but the shape of the end of the male embolus and the size of the depression in the female epigyne are different. The size and shape of the depression also help distinguish the species from Evarcha seyun. The palpal bulb is wider than that of Evarcha pileckii.

== Behaviour and habitat ==
Unlike some other species in the genus, Evarcha praeclara has been identified in a wide range of environments. Like many other Evarcha spiders, it lives in forests. The species seems to particularly thrive in orchards of citrus trees. While some other Evarcha species live in the tree canopy, Evarcha praeclara has been found predominantly in the detritus left underneath trees, or tree litter, sometimes near to water. One female was seen in willow tree litter by the side of a creek. Other examples have been found in dryer and more extreme environments, even living in deserts. Evarcha spiders hunt by ambushing their prey, feeding on insects and other spiders.

== Distribution ==
Evarcha spiders live across the world, although those found in North America may be accidental migrants. Evarcha praeclara lives in Iran, Israel, South Sudan, Sudan, United Arab Emirates and Yemen. The holotype was discovered in 1994 in Ketura the Arabah Valley in Israel, 50 kilometres (31 mi) north of Eilat. It is particularly common in Yemen, and has been observed in the governates of Abyan, Aden, Al Hudaydah, Al Mahwit. Sanaa and Taiz. Some of the first specimen used to define Evarcha praecincta were found near to Taiz and Wadi Surdud in 1991. It has been seen in many areas across the country since then.

The first example found in Iran was discovered 50 kilometres (31 mi) northeast of Shiraz in Fars province in 2000, although it was known as Evarcha praecincta. Deeper problems arise with the spider in Sudan and Southern Sudan. The first examples that were defined as Sudanese were discovered in Gondokoro and Khor Attar and described by Simon in 1906. He called them Mogrus praecinctus and they were only identified as of this species nearly a century later in 2003. These places are now in Central Equatoria and Upper Nile respectively in South Sudan. The first example found in the United Arab Emirates was a male discovered in 2007. Gary Feulner and Binish Roobas suggest that it may be the spider known as the Jebel Fayah Jumper, which was photographed at Jebel Faya.
