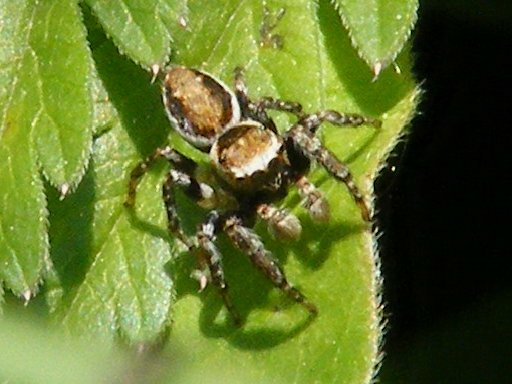
- The related Evarcha hoyi

Scientific classification
- Kingdom: Animalia
- Phylum: Arthropoda
- Subphylum: Chelicerata
- Class: Arachnida
- Order: Araneae
- Infraorder: Araneomorphae
- Family: Salticidae
- Genus: Evarcha
- Species: E. awashi

Binomial name
- Evarcha awashi Wesołowska & Tomasiewicz, 2008

Synonyms
- Evawes awashi (Wesołowska & Tomasiewicz, 2008)

= Evarcha awashi =

Species of spider

Evarcha awashi is a species of jumping spider in the genus Evarcha that lives in Ethiopia. The species was first described in 2008 by Wanda Wesołowska and Beata Tomasiewicz. The spider is small, with a cephalothorax measuring between 2.0 and 2.3 mm (0.08 and 0.09 in) long and an abdomen between 1.9 and 2.4 mm (0.07 and 0.09 in) long. The male and female are similar in size but differ slightly externally. The male carapace is orange while the female is brown, both with a darker eye field. The pattern on the abdomen is generally similar, a combination of light background and dark patches, but the female has less contrast between the two. The legs are mainly brown with yellowish tarsi. Its copulatory organs are distinctive. The male has a short embolus that follows the palpal bulb and a sharp tooth on its short wide and blunt protrusion on its palpal tibia, or tibial apophysis. The female has insemination ducts that narrow into multi-chambered spermathecae.

== Taxonomy ==
Evarcha awashi is a species of jumping spider that was first described by Wanda Wesołowska and Beata Tomasiewicz in 2008. It was one of over 500 species identified by the Polish arachnologist Wesołowska during her career, making her the most prolific modern author in the field. They allocated it to the genus Evarcha, first circumscribed by Eugène Simon in 1902. The genus is one of the largest, with members found on four continents.

In 1976, Jerzy Prószyński placed the genus was placed in the subfamily Pelleninae, along with the genera Bianor and Pellenes. In Wayne Maddison's 2015 study of spider phylogenetic classification, the genus Evarcha was moved to the subtribe Plexippina. This is a member of the tribe Plexippini, in the subclade Simonida in the clade Saltafresia. It is closer to the genera Hyllus and Plexippus. Analysis of protein-coding genes showed it was particularly related to Telamonia. In the following year, Prószyński added the genus to a group of genera named Evarchines, named after the genus, along with Hasarinella and Nigorella based on similarities in the spiders' copulatory organs.

Prószyński placed the spider in a new genus Evawes in 2018 based on its copulatory organs and the way that they differ from other Evarcha spiders. The new genus name is a combination of Evacha and Wesołowska. This designation is not widely accepted and the species remains in the Evarcha genus in the World Spider Catalog. The species is named for the place that was first found.

== Description ==
Evarcha awashi is a small spider. The spider's body is divided into two main parts: a rather rounded almost rectangular cephalothorax and more rounded and oval abdomen that is narrower to the rear. The male has a cephalothorax that is between 2.1 and 2.3 mm (0.08 and 0.09 in) long and 1.7 and 1.8 mm (0.07 and 0.07 in) wide. The spider's abdomen is between 1.9 and 2.3 mm (0.07 and 0.09 in) long and 1.4 and 1.6 mm (0.06 and 0.06 in) wide. The carapace, the hard upper part of the cephalothorax, is high, mainly orange with brownish sides that have a covering of white hairs and a dark line along the sides. The eye field is also darker and the eyes are surrounded by white and orange scales and tufts of white hair. The underside, or sternum, is yellowish with long white and greyish hairs. The spider's face, or clypeus, is also high and has a dense covering of bright orange hairs. The mouthparts are brown, apart from the chelicerae, which are dark brown. It has a single tooth.

The spider's abdomen is greyish brown with a pattern of pale spots that look like a series of four interrupted stripes on top and a heart-shaped patch to the rear. There is a small delicate orange scutum visible towards the front of the abdomen. Thin brown hairs adorn the surface, interrupted by a scattering of long brown bristles. The underside is greyish with a pattern of light dots forming four lines that stretch from the front to the back. The spinnerets are also greyish. T has legs that are mainly brown, but the tarsi are yellow and the femora are darker with wide yellowish rings around their centres. The legs have brown hairs. The pedipalps are brownish and have a covering of yellowish hairs.

The male's copulatory organs are distinctive. The palpal tibia has a short wide and blunt protrusion, or tibial apophysis, which has an additional small tooth-like spike. The palpal bulb is rhomboid. There is a short embolus emanating from the top of the bulb that is bent around so that it follows the outside of the bulb tightly. The cymbium is covered in long hairs.

The female is similar in size to the male, with a cephalothorax that is slightly smaller, between 2.0 and 2.3 mm (0.08 and 0.09 in) long, and 1.5 and 1.7 mm (0.06 and 0.07 in) wide and a slightly larger abdomen that is 2.1 and 2.4 mm (0.08 and 0.09 in) in length and 1.4 and 1.7 mm (0.06 and 0.07 in) in width. The carapace is brownish with a scattering of long brown bristles visible on the top. The eye field is dark brown and has a few white hairs. The eyes themselves are surrounded by black rings. Some examples have a few small white spots between the eyes. The clypeus is brown and has orange scales rather than hairs near the eyes. There are white hairs at the base of the chelicerae.

The pattern on the female abdomen is similar in design to the male, but with less contrast. It is generally brown with a light streak down the middle broken by darker arrow-shaped patches. It lacks the scutum on the male. It has generally brown legs with yellowish tarsi and darker femora. The pedipalps are brown with long white hairs. The copulatory organs are once again distinctive. The epigyne is relatively large with a large oval depression in the middle and broad pocket to the rear. The copulatory openings lead to initially narrow, but then broadening insemination ducts. The accessory glands are long. The spermathecae or receptacles are complex with multiple chambers.

The species is similar to the related Evarcha bakorensis found in West Africa. The male differs in the shape of the copulatory organs, and particularly the small tooth-like appendage on the tibial apophysis, which has a sharper tip than that seen on the other species.

== Distribution and habitat ==
Evarcha spiders live across the world, although those found in North America may be accidental migrants. Although the genus is found across Africa, Evarcha awashi is endemic to Ethiopia. The holotype was found in the Awash National Park in 1987 in what was then Hararghe. Other examples were also found locally. It thrives in stony grassland. Examples have been found in areas of human habitation, including mounds of cut grass. It also lives near to rivers in woodland of Vachellia nilotica trees and under stones amongst shrubs of the genus Commiphora.
