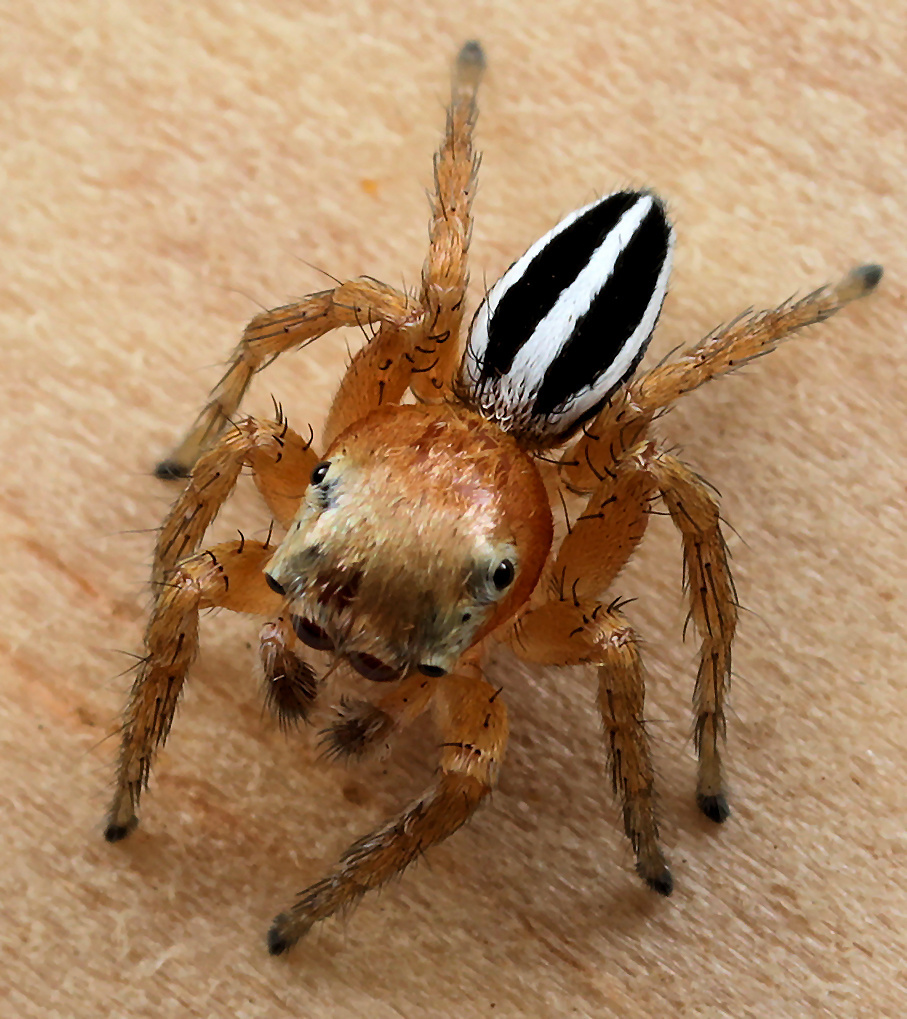
- A male found in Limpopo, South Africa, showing its stripy abdomen

Scientific classification
- Kingdom: Animalia
- Phylum: Arthropoda
- Subphylum: Chelicerata
- Class: Arachnida
- Order: Araneae
- Infraorder: Araneomorphae
- Family: Salticidae
- Genus: Evarcha
- Species: E. striolata

Binomial name
- Evarcha striolata Wesołowska & Haddad, 2009

Synonyms
- Evacin striolata (Wesołowska & Haddad, 2009)

= Evarcha striolata =

Species of jumping spider

Evarcha striolata is a species of jumping spider in the genus Evarcha that lives in South Africa. The species was first described in 2009 by Wanda Wesołowska and Charles Haddad. The spider lives in savanna and forests. Medium-sized, the spider has a dark orange or yellowish-orange carapace, the top side of its cephalothorax, measuring between 2.1 and 2.6 mm (0.08 and 0.10 in) in length and an abdomen that is between 2 and 2.5 mm (0.08 and 0.10 in) long. The male has a pattern of dark stripes on the top of its abdomen, which is recalled in the species name. The female is generally lighter and has indistinct lines formed of dots on both the top and bottom of its abdomen. The underside of cephalothorax, or sternum, is dark yellow in both the female and male. It can be distinguished from other species in the genus by its copulatory organs, particularly the shape of the male's palpal bulb and the female spermathecae (receptacles at the end of its insemination ducts). These are also more similar to Asian and Australian spiders in the genus, which has led Jerzy Prószyński to suggest that it should be a member of a different genus named Evacin.

== Taxonomy and etymology ==
Evarcha striolata is a species of jumping spider, a member of the family Salticidae, that was first described by the arachnologists Wanda Wesołowska and Charles Haddad in 2009. Named for a Latin word meaning "striped", it was one of over 500 species identified by Wesołowska during her career. They allocated it to the genus Evarcha, which had been first circumscribed by Eugène Simon in 1902. The genus is one of the most speciose of the family, with members found on four continents.

In 1976, Jerzy Prószyński placed the genus Evarcha in the subfamily Pelleninae, along with the genera Bianor and Pellenes. In Wayne Maddison's 2015 study of spider phylogenetic classification, the genus Evarcha was moved to the subtribe Plexippina. Plexippina is a member of the tribe Plexippini, which was listed in the subclade Simonida in the clade Saltafresia by Maddison. In 2016, Jerzy Prószyński added the genus to a group of genera named Evarchines along with Hasarinella and Nigorella based on similarities in the spiders' copulatory organs. According to Maddison, Melissa Bodner and Karen Needham, the genus is closely related to the genera Hyllus and Plexippus. Analysis of protein-coding genes showed it is particularly related to Telamonia.

Prószyński placed the spider in a new genus Evacin in 2018 based on its copulatory organs and the way that they differ from other African Evarcha spiders. The new genus name is a combination of Evacha and flavocin. This designation is not widely accepted and the species remains in the Evarcha genus in the World Spider Catalog.

== Description ==
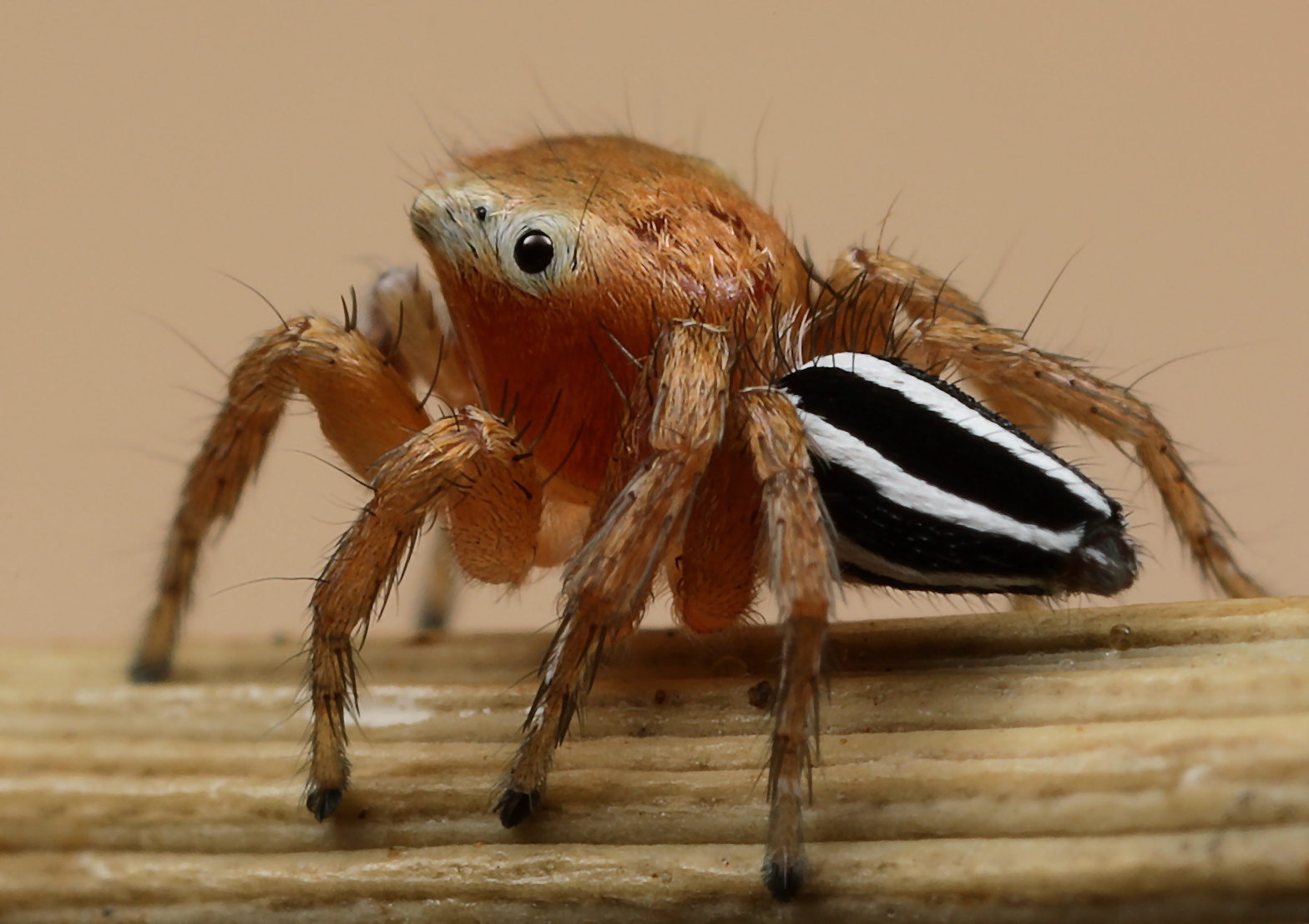
Male Evarcha striolata

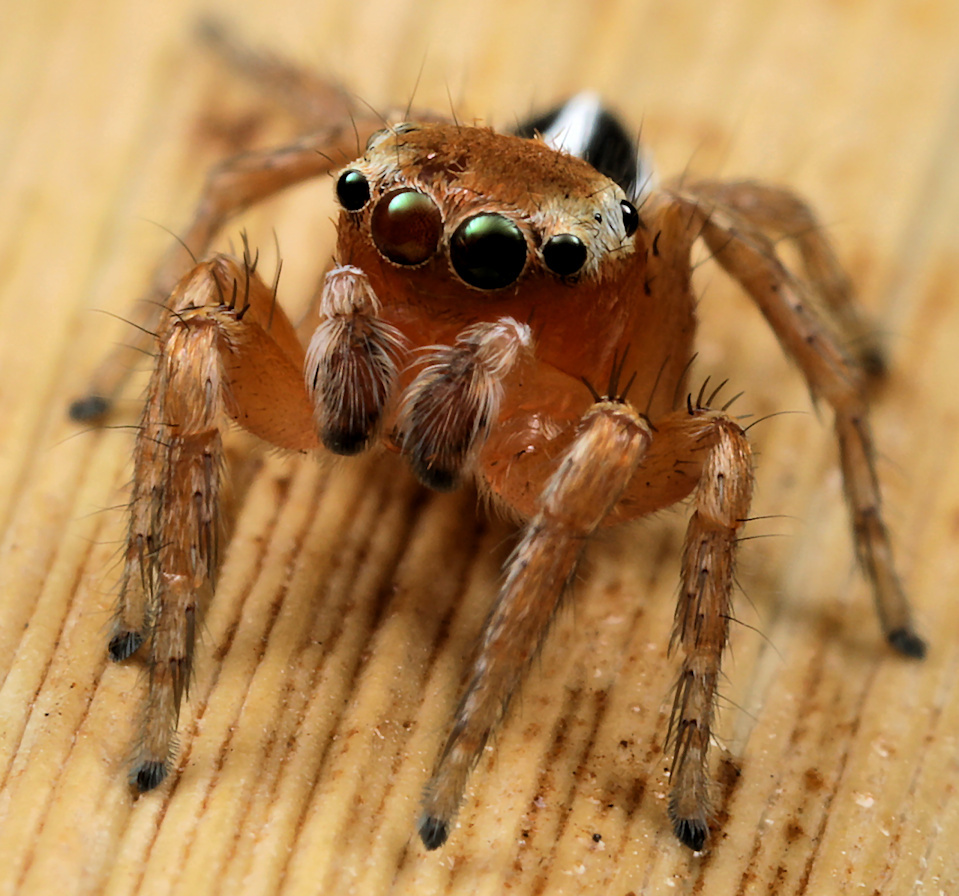
Male Evarcha striolata

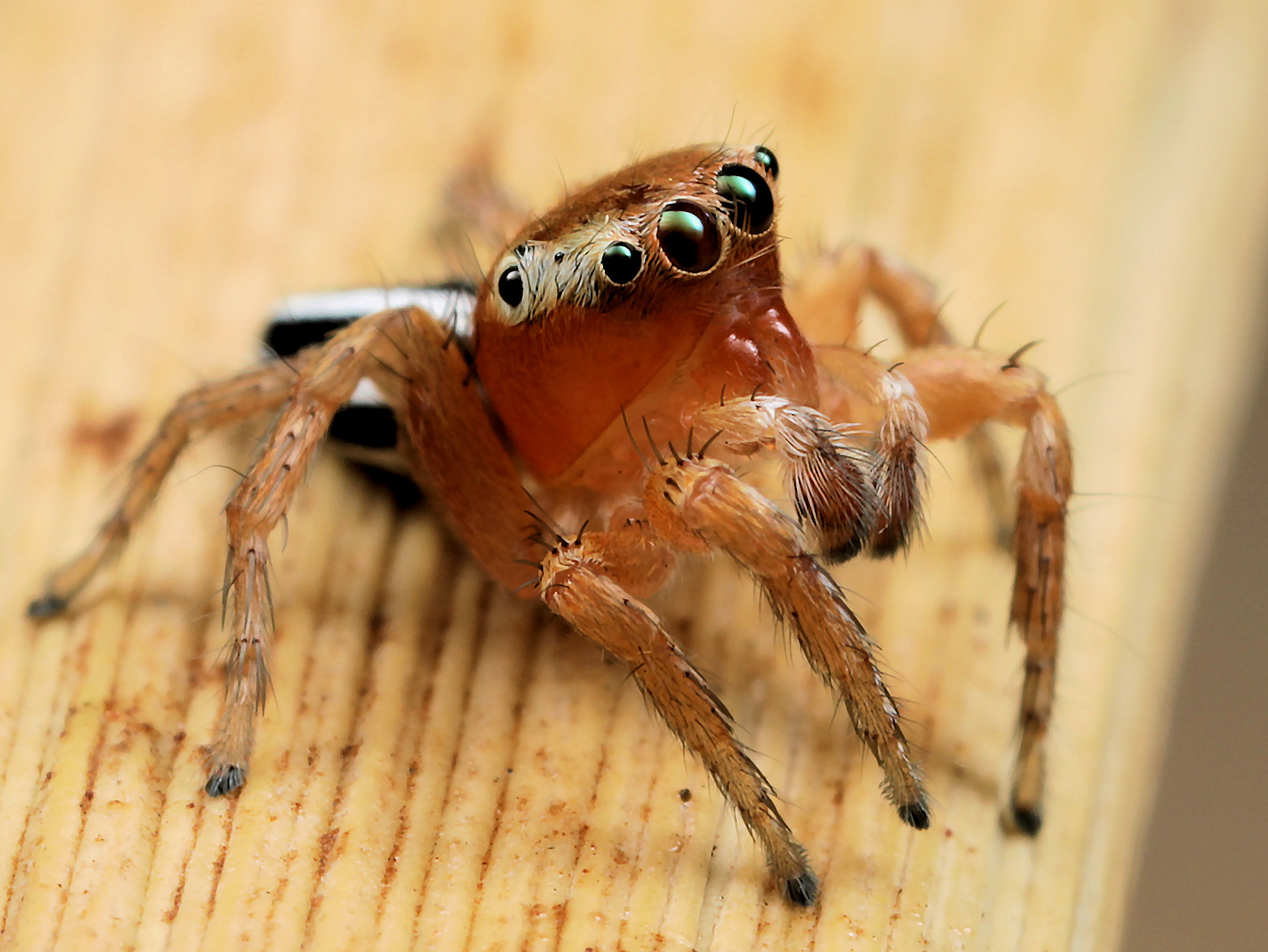
Male Evarcha striolata

Evarcha striolata is a medium-sized spider with looks that are typical for the genus. It has a body divided into two main parts: a rectangular cephalothorax and thinner, more oval abdomen. The male has a carapace, the hard upper side of the cephalothorax, that is typically 2.1 mm (0.08 in) long and 1.6 mm (0.06 in) wide. Generally rather high with a sharply sloping back. it is generally dark orange and hairless with dark rings around the eyes. There are a few delicate bristles near the front eyes. The underside of the cephalothorax, or sternum, is dark yellow. The spider's clypeus, or face, is low and is decorated with a scattering of delicate hairs. The mouthparts, including the chelicerae, labium and maxillae, are dark yellow.

The male spider's abdomen is narrower than its carapace, typically measuring 2 mm (0.08 in) in length and having a width of typically 1.1 mm (0.04 in). The top side has a distinctive striped pattern, with two brown streaks formed of dark hairs running down the abdomen from front to back, divided by three yellow streaks. It lacks the scutum on the back that marks out the similar Evarcha flagellaris. There are dark streaks on the sides while the underside is light yellow with a pattern of two thin dark lines running from front to back crossed by another line that runs across near the pale spinnerets. The spider has yellowish legs that have a covering of short brown hairs and a relatively large number of spines. The pedipalps are pale.

The spider's copulatory organs are similar to other species in the genus, particularly those found in Australia, like Evarcha infrastriata, and Asia, like Evarcha flavocincta and Evarcha kochi. The last of those is the type species for the genus Evacin. Evarcha striolata has male copulatory organs that include a round hemispherical tegulum that has a long thin embolus attached to the side. The embolus follows the curve of the palpal bulb until it reaches the top, at which point it projects towards the cymbium that surrounds the tegulum. At the base of the tegulum is palpal tibia, which has a large spike called a tibial apophysis projecting from it. It is the longer embolus and lack of bulges on the palpal bulb that distinguish it from Evarcha flagellaris.

The female is similar in shape to but larger than the male, with a cephalothorax that measures between 2.5 and 2.6 mm (0.10 and 0.10 in) long and a width between 1.9 and 2 mm (0.07 and 0.08 in). Its carapace is high and convex, mainly yellowish-orange with a scattering of brown hairs on the thorax. The eye field is a lighter yellow with black rings and white scales around the eyes themselves. There are a few bristles at the front of the eye field. The sternum is dark yellow. It has a high clypeus that is covered in fine hairs. The mouthparts are dark yellow like the male.

The female's abdomen is similar in shape to the male. It is an ovoid between 2.4 mm (0.09 in) and 2.5 mm in length and between 1.4 and 1.5 mm (0.06 and 0.06 in) in width. Unlike the male, it is yellowish white on top and white underneath, both with an indistinct pattern of small beige dots forming two lines running down the middle. Its spinnerets are white and legs orange with brown spines and hairs.

Understanding the female's copulatory organs were critical to defining the species. Its external genital structure, or epigyne, is broad with two widely spaced grooves and a wide pocket at the epigastric fold towards the very rear of the spider. The two copulatory openings lead to very wide insemination ducts that are slightly sclerotized and form a loop on their way to the spermathecae or receptacles. These spermathecae are formed of a few chambers. It is the small number of chambers that differentiates the spider from the otherwise similar Evarcha flagellaris.

== Behaviour and habitat ==
Evarcha striolata lives on the ground amongst grasses, particularly grassy tussocks and grass litter. It has been spotted living in forests in the shade of Vachellia xanthophloea and in savanna dominated by Vachellia tortilis. Evarcha spiders will often live in nests constructed of webs amongst the trees. A study of the related Evarcha arcuata found that the spider will rest hanging from a silken thread. They eat a wide range of food, including aphids, flies and other spiders. Like other jumping spiders, they do not spin webs to catch their prey but instead hunt by ambushing, feeding on insects and other spiders.

== Distribution ==
Evarcha spiders live across the world, although those found in North America may be accidental migrants. The genus is found across Africa. Evarcha striolata is endemic to South Africa. The male holotype for the species was found in the Ndumo Game Reserve in KwaZulu-Natal in 2006.
