= Hasarinella distincta =

Scientific classification
- Kingdom: Animalia
- Phylum: Arthropoda
- Subphylum: Chelicerata
- Class: Arachnida
- Order: Araneae
- Infraorder: Araneomorphae
- Family: Salticidae
- Genus: Hasarinella
- Species: H. distincta

Binomial name
- Hasarinella distincta Haddad & Wesołowska, 2013

Species of jumping spider

Hasarinella distincta, the Hasarinella Jumping Spider, is a species of jumping spider that lives in the grasslands and woodlands of South Africa. A member of the genus Hasarinella, the species was first described in 2013 by the arachnologists Charles R. Haddad and Wanda Wesołowska. It has a dark brown oval forward section, or cephalothorax, that is between 3.4 and 3.8 mm (0.13 and 0.15 in) long and, behind that, a brown ovoid abdomen that has a length between 3.7 and 4.5 mm (0.15 and 0.18 in). The male is larger than the female and has a marking of three white streaks, one in the middle and two along the edges, on the upper part of the spider’s front section that the female lacks. It is hard to distinguish from the related Hasarinella berlandi without examining its copulatory organs, particularly the female’s wider insemination ducts and the male’s oval palpal bulb. Its conservation status is considered of least concern

== Taxonomy and etymology ==
Hasarinella distincta is a [is a species of jumping spider, a member of the family Salticidae, that was first described by the arachnologists Charles R. Haddad and Wanda Wesołowska in 2013. The species is one of over 500 named by the Polish arachnologist Wesołowska. It was allocated to the genus Hasarinella, which had been first circumscribed by Wesołowska in 2012. In 2015, Wayne Maddison defined the genus Hasarinella as a possible thiratoscirtine. It is member of the subclade Simonida in the clade Saltafresia, both named in honour of the French arachnologist Eugène Simon. In 2016, it had been grouped with eight other genera of jumping spiders under the name Evarchines, named after the related genus Evarcha, by Jerzy Prószyński.

The spider's common name is the Hasarinella Jumping Spider. Its scientific name is composed of two parts. Its generic name is a diminutive of Hasarius, the genus in which the type species Hasarinella berlandi had been originally placed. TIts specific name is a Latin word that can be translated 'distinct' and refers to the male mouthparts.

== Description ==
Hasarinella spiders have an elongated body and long legs, They have a body divided into two main parts: a forward section called a cephalothorax and, behind that, an abdomen. The male Hasarinella distincta has a cephalothorax that has a typical length of 3.8 mm (0.15 in) and width of 2.9 mm (0.11 in). Its oval carapace, the hard upper part of its cephalothorax, is moderately high and dark brown, covered with brown hairs. It has a thin white streak down the middle and one on each of the sides. There are bristles and scales near the spider’s eyes. The underside of its cephalothorax, or its sternum, is brown. The lower part of the spider's face, or clypeus, is low and dark brown with a scattering of white hairs. Its chelicerae is dark brown, large and robust with a short fang, two teeth to the front and one large teeth to the back. Its remaining mouthparts, including its labium and maxillae, are light brown apart from edges, which have thin white markings.

The male's abdomen is ovoid and brown apart from two white streaks on the back. It is typically 3.7 mm (0.15 in) long and 2.2 mm (0.087 in) wide. The top is covered in brown hairs and the underside is greyish-brown. The spider has brown spinnerets, which are used to spin webs. It has brown hairy legs and pedipalps, the former covered in brown hairs and spines and marked with a fine line consisting of white hairs running on their upper sides. The latter are brown and covered with white hairs. There is a short spike on the palpal tibia known as a tibial apophysis. At the end of the tibia is an oval palpal bulb is that ends in a short straight and wide embolus.

The female has a smaller cephalothorax than the male that is typically 3.4 mm (0.13 in) lond and 2.7 mm (0.11 in) wide and a longer abdomen which has a length of 4.5 mm (0.18 in) and a width of 3.0 mm (0.12 in). It is generally similar to the male to look at, except it does not have the white lines on the body or the scales near the eyes. Its abdomen is similar on the top but has white dots forming four lines marking out the black underside. Its spinnerets are yellowish-grey and the legs brown. The spider has a distinctive epigyne, the visible external part of its copulatory organs, that has a depression towards the front and a broad pocket surrounded by a relatively deep furrow. Its copulatory openings have lips that are delicate and show signs of sclerotization. They lead via insemination ducts that are lightly sclerotized at the start to simple spermathecae, or receptacles.

The species can be confused with the related Hasarinella berlandi but can be distinguished by its copulatory organs. Although the female’s epigyne is similar, its seminal ducts are wider than those found in the other spider. The male's palpal bulb is oval and lacks the protuberances on the tegulum of the other species.

== Distribution and habitat ==
Hasarinella distincta is endemic to South Africa. The holotype was discovered in 2009 in the Lekgalameetse Provincial Park. It lives in both grassland and woodland dominated by Acacia trees. The spider has been found at altitudes of between 969 and 1,414 m (3,179 and 4,639 ft) above sea level. The species is more visible in the wet season but, at higher altitudes, is more commonly seen in the dry season. The spider has been found at altitudes of between 969 and 1,414 m (3,179 and 4,639 ft) above sea level. It has no known threats. Due to its wide distribution, its conservation status is considered of least concern.
