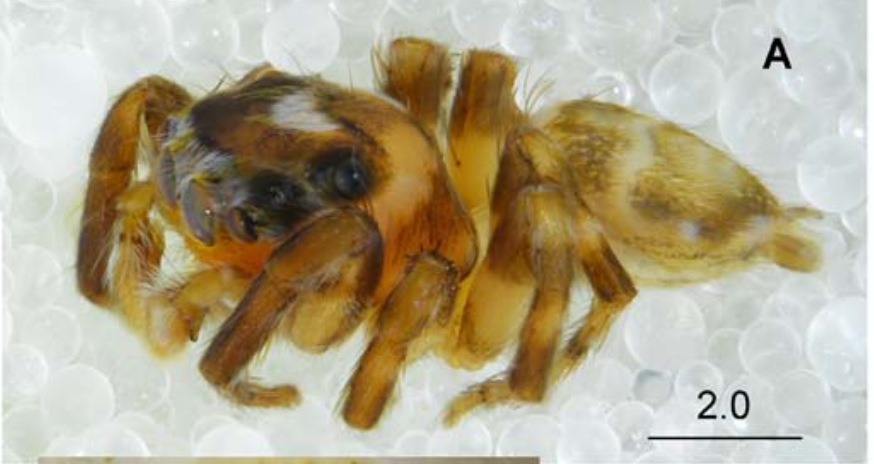
- Male adult from Ivory Coast

Scientific classification
- Kingdom: Animalia
- Phylum: Arthropoda
- Subphylum: Chelicerata
- Class: Arachnida
- Order: Araneae
- Infraorder: Araneomorphae
- Family: Salticidae
- Genus: Evarcha
- Species: E. bakorensis

Binomial name
- Evarcha bakorensis Rollard & Wesołowska, 2002

Synonyms
- Evawes bakorensis (Rollard & Wesołowska, 2002)

= Evarcha bakorensis =

Species of jumping spider

Evarcha bakorensis is a species of jumping spider that lives in Guinea, Ivory Coast and Nigeria. A member of the genus Evarcha, it is often found in savanna grasslands. The first specimen to be identified as a member of the species was discovered near Bakoré in the Guinea Highlands. The spider is small, measuring between 2.9 and 3.7 mm (0.11 and 0.15 in) long, the female being larger than the male. The oval front section has a light brown topside, or carapace, yellow underside, or sternum, and darker sides. Behind this, the spider's egg-shaped abdomen is greyish-brown or brown and marked with a lighter pattern. The spider has generally brown legs. It has distinctive copulatory organs. The female has a large membrane in the centre of its epigyne while the male has a straight and blunt tibial apophysis, or projection on its palpal tibia. The species was first described in 2002 by the arachnologists Christine Rollard and Wanda Wesołowska.

== Taxonomy ==
Evarcha bakorensis is a species of jumping spider, a member of the family Salticidae, that was first described by the arachnologists Christine Rollard and Wanda Wesołowska in 2002. It was one of over 500 species identified by Wesołowska during her career, making her one of the most prolific authors in the field. They allocated it to the genus Evarcha, that had been first circumscribed by Eugène Simon in 1902. The genus is one of the largest, with members found on four continents. The species is named for Bakoré, which is near the place where it was first found. The holotype is stored in Paris in the National Museum of Natural History, France.

In 1976, Jerzy Prószyński placed the genus Evarcha in the subfamily Pelleninae, along with the related genus Pellenes. In Wayne Maddison's 2015 study of spider phylogenetic classification, studying the physical similarities between species, the genus Evarcha was moved to the subtribe Plexippina. This is a member of the tribe Plexippini, in the subclade Simonida in the clade Saltafresia. It is closely related to the genera Hyllus and Plexippus. Analysis of protein-coding genes showed it was particularly related to Telamonia. In the following year, in 2016, Prószyński added the genus to a group of genera named Evarchines, named after the genus, along with Hasarinella and Nigorella based on similarities in the spiders' copulatory organs.

Prószyński placed the spider in a new genus Evawes in 2018 based on its copulatory organs and the way that they differ from other Evarcha spiders. The new genus name is a combination of Evacha and Wesołowska. This designation is not widely accepted and the species remains in the Evarcha genus in the World Spider Catalog. At the same time, Prószyński also noted the similarity between the species and those in the genus Pellenes, speculating that its relationship with other jumping spiders may not be closed.

== Description ==
Evarcha bakorensis is small with looks that are typical for the genus. The spider's body is divided into two main parts: an oval forward section called a cephalothorax and, behind that, an egg-shaped abdomen. The male has cephalothorax that measures typically 1.6 mm (0.06 in) long and 1.1 mm (0.04 in) wide. Its carapace, the hard upper part of its cephalothorax, is convex and high. Largely light brown with darker sides, it is covered with delicate colourless hairs. It has a dark brown eye field with small fawn scales between some of the eyes. Some examples also have a triangular patch between their eyes. The part of the underside of its cephalothorax known as its sternum is dark yellow or yellowish-brown. Its mouthparts are distinctive. They are generally light brown and while its chelicerae have two teeth to the front and a single tooth to the back, its labium and maxillae have light tips. The part of the spider's face known as its clypeus has a covering of fawnish-yellow hairs. The spider has a similar coloration on its clypeus to the related Evarcha ignea.

The male has an abdomen that is smaller than the carapace, measuring between 1.3 and 1.4 mm (0.05 and 0.06 in) long and 0.9 and 1 mm (0.04 and 0.04 in) wide. It is a brown oval with a pattern consisting of a lighter patch shaped like a leaf and four white patches on its back. The underside is grey or yellowish. The spider has dark spinnerets used for spinning webs. Its legs are generally brown. The first pair are darker.

The spider has a distinctive copulatory organs with yellowish-brown pedipalps and a palpal tibia that has a small number of long bristles. The tibia has a single straight, wide and blunt protrusion, or tibial apophysis. Attached to the pedipalp is a rounded palpal bulb with a large protrusion at its base. The embolus emanating from the top of the bulb is thin and curved. It is the spider's copulatory organs that most help identify it. For example, the blunt end to the spider's tibial apophysis helps distinguish it from the related Evarcha awashi, Evarcha carbonaria and Evarcha ignea.

The female of this species is larger than the male, with a cephalothorax that is between 1.6 and 1.8 mm (0.06 and 0.07 in) in length and typically 1.3 mm (0.05 in) wide and an abdomen that has a length between 1.7 and 1.9 mm (0.07 and 0.07 in) and a width of between 1.3 and 1.5 mm (0.05 and 0.06 in). It has a light brown carapace with darker sides similar to the male, with the area around the eyes black and a covering of colourless hairs apart from long brown bristles near the eyes themselves. Its sternum is yellow. Its chelicerae are brown while its labium and maxillae are brownish with light tips. Its clypeus is covered in orange hairs.

The female's abdomen is greyish-brown on top and yellow with a hint of grey underneath. On the top, there is a lighter pattern of a large butterfly-shape patch on forward half, three chevrons to the rear, and four round spots at the very back. The underside is marked by dots that form four lines. The spider's spinnerets are yellowish-grey. The spider has patches of yellow on its otherwise brown legs, which have dark hairs and spines. It has a large membrane in the centre of its epigyne, the external visible part of its copulatory organs. There are two copulatory openings, which lead via insemination ducts to sclerotized receptacles, or spermathecae,

== Distribution and habitat ==
Although the genus is found across Africa, Evarcha bakorensis has only been found living in Guinea, Ivory Coast and Nigeria. The male holotype for the species was found in 1956 on the road to Bakoré in the Guinea Highlands at an altitude of 500 m (1,600 ft) above sea level. The first examples found in Nigeria were discovered in 1974 in the International Institute of Tropical Agriculture in Ibadan and the Borgu Game Reserve in Kwara State. Other specimens were subsequently found near Mokwa. In 1975, the first examples were collected in Ivory Coast.

The first specimen of the species was found in grasses of the Andropogon genus and subsequent examples have been often found living in savanna grasslands. One example was found in 14 year old savanna regrowth. Some Evarcha bakorensis spiders have also been found living in debris left on the side of a river from flooding.
