= Hasarinella =

Scientific classification
- Kingdom: Animalia
- Phylum: Arthropoda
- Subphylum: Chelicerata
- Class: Arachnida
- Order: Araneae
- Infraorder: Araneomorphae
- Family: Salticidae
- Subfamily: Salticinae
- Genus: Hasarinella; Wesołowska

Type species
- Hasarinella berlandi

Species
- H. berlandi (Lessert, 1925); H. distincta Haddad & Wesołowska, 2013; H. roeweri (Lessert, 1925)

Genus of spiders

Hasarinella is a genus of spiders in the family Salticidae. It was first described in 2012 by Wanda Wesołowska.

== Species ==
As of October 2025, this genus includes three species:

- Hasarinella berlandi (Lessert, 1925) – Tanzania (type species)
- Hasarinella distincta Haddad & Wesołowska, 2013 – South Africa
- Hasarinella roeweri (Lessert, 1925) – Kenya, Tanzania
