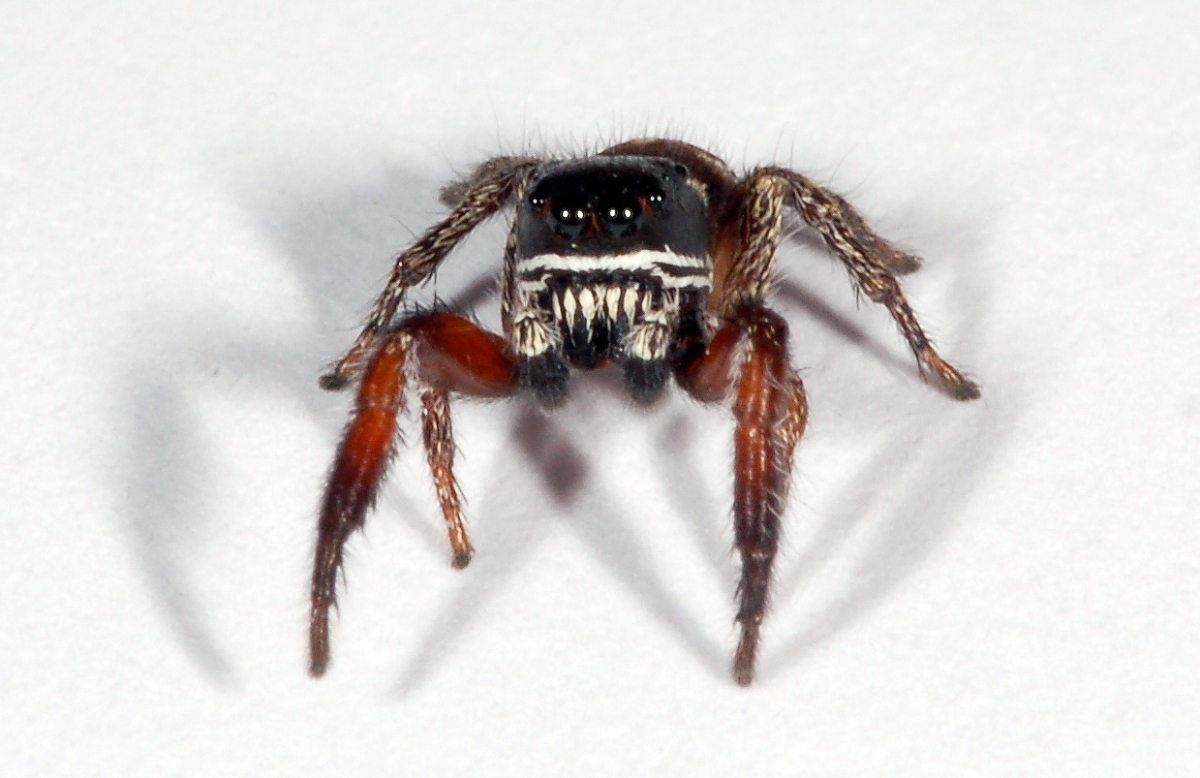
- The related Pellenes nigrociliatus

Scientific classification
- Kingdom: Animalia
- Phylum: Arthropoda
- Subphylum: Chelicerata
- Class: Arachnida
- Order: Araneae
- Infraorder: Araneomorphae
- Family: Salticidae
- Genus: Pellenes
- Species: P. striolatus

Binomial name
- Pellenes striolatus Wesołowska & van Harten, 2002

= Pellenes striolatus =

Species of spider

Pellenes striolatus is a species of jumping spider in the genus Pellenes that lives on Socotra Island, Yemen. It was first described in 2002 by Wanda Wesołowska and Antonius van Harten. The spider is smaller than many in the genus, with a carapace that measures typically 1.4 mm (0.06 in) in length and an abdomen that is between 1.3 and 2 mm (0.05 and 0.08 in) long. The female has a larger abdomen than the male. Both are generally very dark, nearly black, and have a distinctive white pattern on the abdomen. The pattern consists of a central white stripe that is flanked by white diagonal lines, and is recalled in the species name, which can be translated "thinly streaked". The spider has copulatory organs that are similar to other species in the genus. The female has a shallow pocket in the middle of its epigyne and the male has a thick embolus.

== Taxonomy ==
Pellenes striolatus is a species of jumping spider that was first described by Wanda Wesołowska and Antonius van Harten in 2002. They allocated the spider to the genus Pellenes, which had been first circumscribed in 1876 by Eugène Simon. The species is named after a Latin word that can be translated "thinly streaked" and relates to the pattern on its abdomen.

Wayne Maddison placed the genus Pellenes in the subtribe Harmochirina in the tribe Plexippini in 2015. This had previously been known as Harmochireae, as circumscribed by Simon in 1903. It is allocated to the subclade Saltafresia in the clade Salticoida. The spider is a member of Plexippoida. Phylogenetic analysis of molecular data demonstrates that the genus is most closely related to Habronattus and Havaika. In 2016, Jerzy Prószyński grouped the genus with Dexippus under the name Pelenines, named after the genus. This is allocated to the supergroup Hylloida.

== Description ==
Pellenes spiders are generally medium-sized to large spiders that range between 3.1 and 9.9 mm (0.12 and 0.39 in) in length. However, Pellenes striolatus is very small, measuring about 3 mm (0.12 in) in total length. The spider's body is divided into two main parts: the cephalothorax and the abdomen. Pellenes striolatus has a carapace, the hard upper part of the cephalothorax, that is typically 1.4 mm (0.06 in) long and between 1.1 and 1.2 mm (0.04 and 0.05 in) wide. The male has a carapace, the hard upper surface of the cephalothorax, that is lower at the front and higher at the back. It is dark brown, nearly black, and covered in short dark brown hairs, interspersed with long bristles. The underside, or sternum, is also dark brown. The eye field is black and shiny. The spider's face, or clypeus, is low and brownish, with a few brown hairs protruding from it forwards. The mouthparts consist of dark brown chelicerae, labium and maxilae.

The spider is most easily distinguished from other members of the genus, particularly the otherwise closely related Pellenes geniculatus, by the design of its abdomen. The male spider's abdomen is smaller than its carapace, typically measuring 1.3 mm (0.05 in) in length and 1 mm (0.04 in) in width. The top is black with a white pattern consisting of a single brown stripe that goes down the middle from the front to back with two smaller and fainter diagonal lines that emanate from each of the sides in the back-middle-half and two vague patches nearer to the front. There are short black hairs across the surface of the abdomen, occasionally interrupted by long bristles, and a few white scales on the very front. The bottom is dark. The spider's forward spinnerets are dark brown while the rearmost at grey. The spider's front legs are generally black with some segments brownish-red. It is covered in black hairs. The remaining legs are brown with yellowish-orange segments and long brown leg hairs.

The female is generally larger than the male, particularly in its abdomen, which is typically 2 mm (0.08 in) long and 1.5 mm (0.06 in) wide. The carapace is similar in design. However, the abdomen is very different. The top of the abdomen is lighter, more brown than black. It has a distinctive pattern, consisting of a central white stripe flanked by two diagonal white stripes, slightly curved, either side near to the back. The sides nearer to the front are dominated by a white patch that extends across the whole surface, merging with the central stripe towards the front. The underside is brownish-grey. The legs are brown and yellow.

The spider's reproductive system is similar to others in the genus. The male has a pedipalp that is dark brown. It has a rounded palpal bulb with a thick embolus emanating from near to the front. The palpal tibia is smooth and has a single large slightly-curved protrusion, or tibial apophysis. The female has an epigyne that is typical for the genus. It has a shallow pocket in the middle and two copulatory openings that lead to large spermathecae, or receptacles. There are also large accessory glands.

== Distribution ==
Pellenes spiders can be found across the Afrotropical, Holarctic and Indomalayan realms, but are particularly common around the Mediterranean Sea and in Central Asia. Pellenes striolatus is endemic to Yemen. The holotype was found near Wadi Daneghan on Socotra Island in 2000. It has not been found in other areas of the country.
