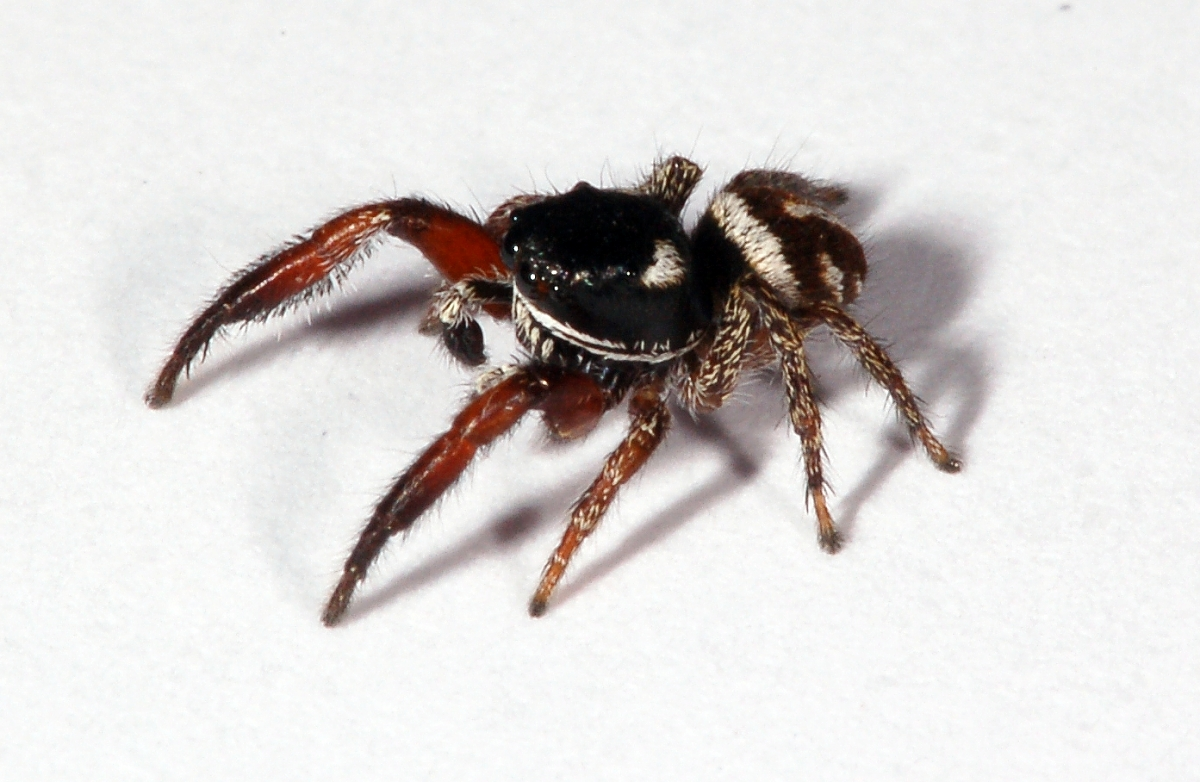
- The related Pellenes nigrociliatus

Scientific classification
- Kingdom: Animalia
- Phylum: Arthropoda
- Subphylum: Chelicerata
- Class: Arachnida
- Order: Araneae
- Infraorder: Araneomorphae
- Family: Salticidae
- Genus: Pellenes
- Species: P. luculentus

Binomial name
- Pellenes luculentus Wesołowska & van Harten, 2007

= Pellenes luculentus =

Species of spider

Pellenes luculentus is a species of jumping spider in the genus Pellenes that lives in Yemen. It was first described in 2007 by Wanda Wesołowska and Antonius van Harten. The spider is medium-sized, with a carapace that measures typically 2.2 mm (0.09 in) in length and an abdomen 2.2 mm (0.09 in) in length. The female has a light fawn and yellowish body, as recalled in the species name, which is derived from a Latin word for "light". The female has copulatory organs that are similar to other species in the genus, with a septum, or wall, in the middle of ita epigyne. It can be distinguished by its clearer and wider copulatory openings, hidden in deep pits, and longer insemination ducts. The male has not been described.

== Taxonomy ==
Pellenes luculentus is a species of jumping spider that was first described by Wanda Wesołowska and Antonius van Harten in 2007. It was one of over 500 species identified by the Polish arachnologist Wesołowska during her career, more than any other contemporary writer and second only to Eugène Simon. They allocated the spider to the subgenus Pelmirus in the genus Pellenes. Pellenes had been first circumscribed by Simon in 1876. The species is named after a Latin word that can be translated "light".

Wayne Maddison placed the genus Pellenes in the subtribe Harmochirina in the tribe Plexippini in 2015. This had previously been known as Harmochireae, as circumscribed by Simon in 1903. It is allocated to the subclade Saltafresia in the clade Salticoida. The spider is a member of Plexippoida. Phylogenetic analysis of molecular data demonstrates that the genus is most closely related to Habronattus and Havaika. In 2016, Jerzy Prószyński grouped the genus with Dexippus under the name Pelenines, named after the genus. This is allocated to the supergroup Hylloida.

== Description ==
Pellenes spiders are generally medium-sized to large spiders that range between 3.1 and 9.9 mm (0.12 and 0.39 in) in length. The spider's body is divided into two main parts: a cephalothorax and an abdomen. Pellenes luculentus has a carapace, the hard upper part of the cephalothorax, that is typically 2.2 mm (0.09 in) long and 1.7 mm (0.07 in) wide. The female has an oval carapace, the hard upper surface of the cephalothorax, that is fawn and covered in white scales, interspersed with a scattering of brown bristles. The underside, or sternum, is orange. There are bushy bristles on the eye field and black rings around the eyes themselves. The spider's face, or clypeus, is covered in white hairs. The mouthparts, which include the chelicerae, labium and maxilae, are orange.

The female spider's abdomen is larger than its carapace, typically measuring 3.2 mm (0.13 in) in length and 2.3 mm (0.09 in) in width. It is squat with a yellowish top, covered in delicate light hairs and sparse brown spikes, and a light underside. The spider's spinnerets are yellow with brown tips. Its legs are also yellow, but have brown hairs, white scales and light spines. The pedipalps are light and have dense white hairs. The spider's copulatory organs are distinctive, with a strongly elevated septum, or wall, in the middle of the epigyne. The copulatory openings lead to wide insemination ducts and oval spermathecae, or receptacles, which have thick walls. There is weak sclerotization on the epigyne and insemination ducts. The male has not been described.

The spider is similar to Pellenes dilutus and Pellenes pulcher, particular in the design of its body and the septum on the female's epigyne. It can be distinguished from them by the length of the septum, which is shorter, the way that its copulatory openings are hidden in deep pits and the length of the insemination ducts, which are longer. The openings are also clearer and wider than other species in the genus.

== Distribution ==
Pellenes spiders can be found across the Afrotropical, Holarctic and Indomalayan realms, but are particularly common around the Mediterranean Sea and in Central Asia. Some live on the Arabian Peninsula. Pellenes luculentus is endemic to Yemen. The holotype was found near Al-Qatn in 2002.
