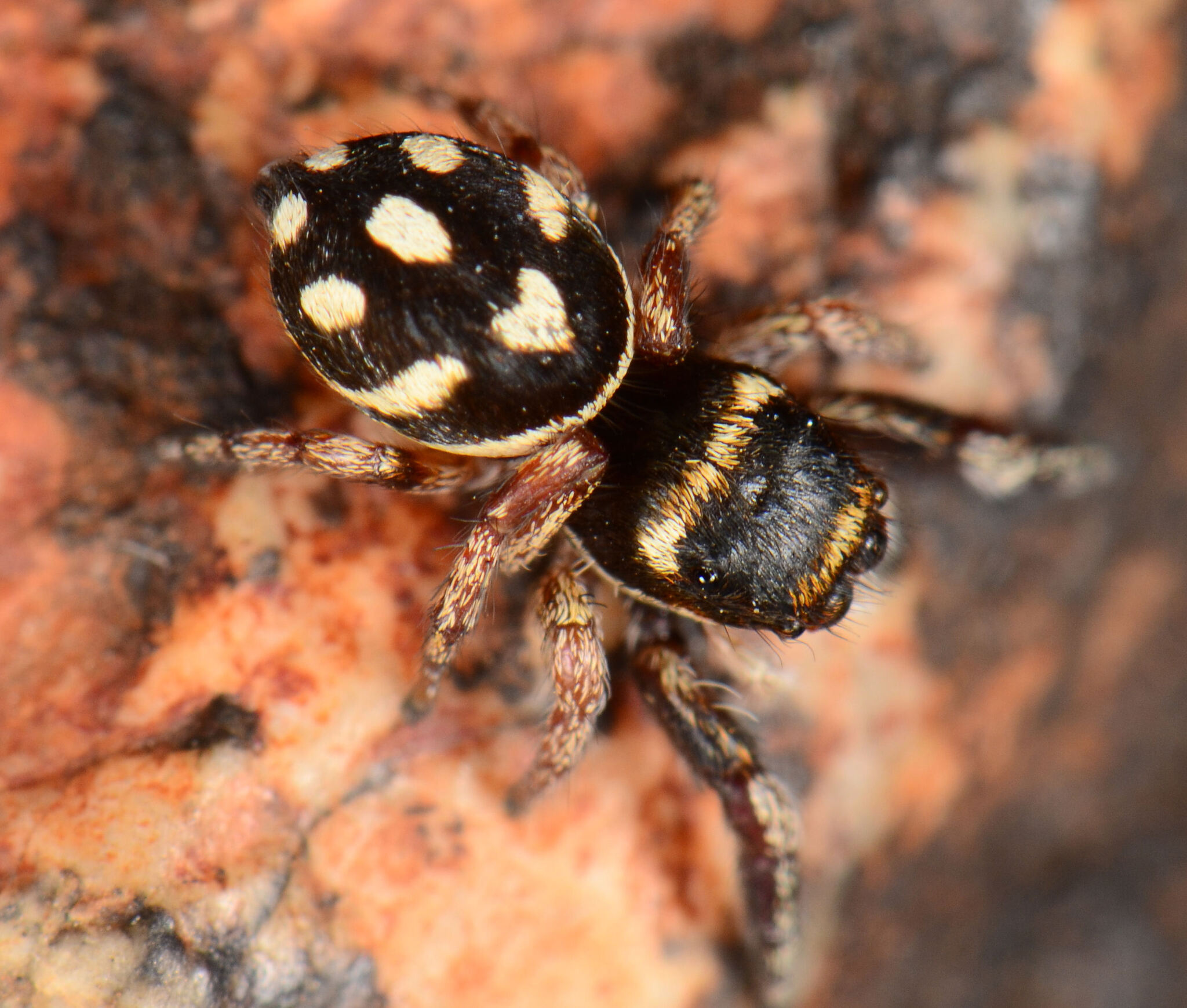

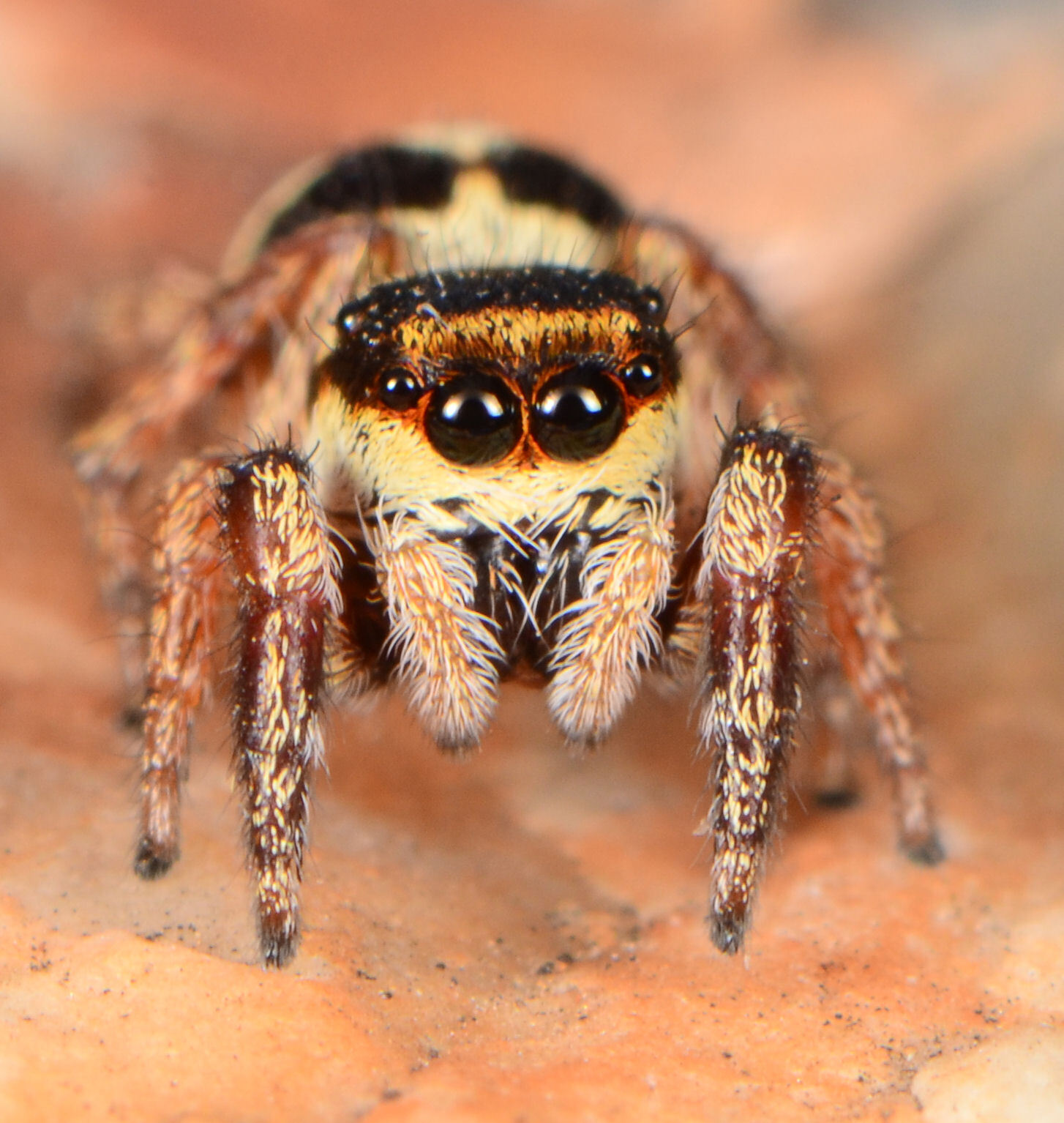
- A mature female from South Africa

Conservation status
- Least Concern (IUCN 3.1)

Scientific classification
- Kingdom: Animalia
- Phylum: Arthropoda
- Subphylum: Chelicerata
- Class: Arachnida
- Order: Araneae
- Infraorder: Araneomorphae
- Family: Salticidae
- Genus: Pellenes
- Species: P. tharinae

Binomial name
- Pellenes tharinae Wesołowska, 2006

= Pellenes tharinae =

Species of jumping spider

Pellenes tharinae is a species of jumping spider that lives in Namibia, South Africa and Zimbabwe. It has been found living amongst plant litter in a forest and in the chimney of a termite mound. A hairy medium-sized spider, it has a forward section, or carapace, that is between 1.3 and 1.7 mm (0.05 and 0.07 in) long and, behind that, an abdomen that is between 1.2 and 2.1 mm (0.05 and 0.08 in) long. The female is larger than the male. The spider is generally dark brown on top and there is a distinctive pattern on the abdomen of both sexes that looks like a white arrow. The underside of the spider is also brown, although its sternum is a lighter brown. The spider's front legs are darker than the rest and there are hairs at the bottom of the spider's chelicerae. The female has flaps on its epigyne, the external visible part of its copulatory organs. The species was first described in 2006. It is named after the arachnologist Tharina Bird.

== Taxonomy and etymology ==
Pellenes tharinae is a species of jumping spider, a member of the family Salticidae. The species was first described by the arachnologist Wanda Wesołowska in 2006. Wesołowska allocated the spider to the genus Pellenes, which was first circumscribed in 1876 by Eugène Simon. The species is named after Tharina Bird, an arachnologist at the Namibian National Museum. In 2000, Dmitri Logunov and Yuri Marusik divided the genus Pellenes into four subgenera, based on the shape of the male palpal bulb. The species is a member of the subgenus Pelmultus.

Wayne Maddison placed the genus Pellenes in the subtribe Harmochirina in the tribe Plexippini in 2015. This had originally been known as Harmochireae, as circumscribed by Simon in 1903. Previously a member of the clade Plexippoida, it was allocated by Maddison to the subclade Saltafresia in the clade Salticoida. In 2016, Jerzy Prószyński grouped the genus with Dexippus under the name Pelenines, named after the genus. It is allocated to the supergroup Hylloida. Molecular phylogenetic analysis demonstrates that the genus is most closely related to Habronattus and Havaika. The holotype is kept in the National Museum of Namibia, Windhoek.

== Description ==
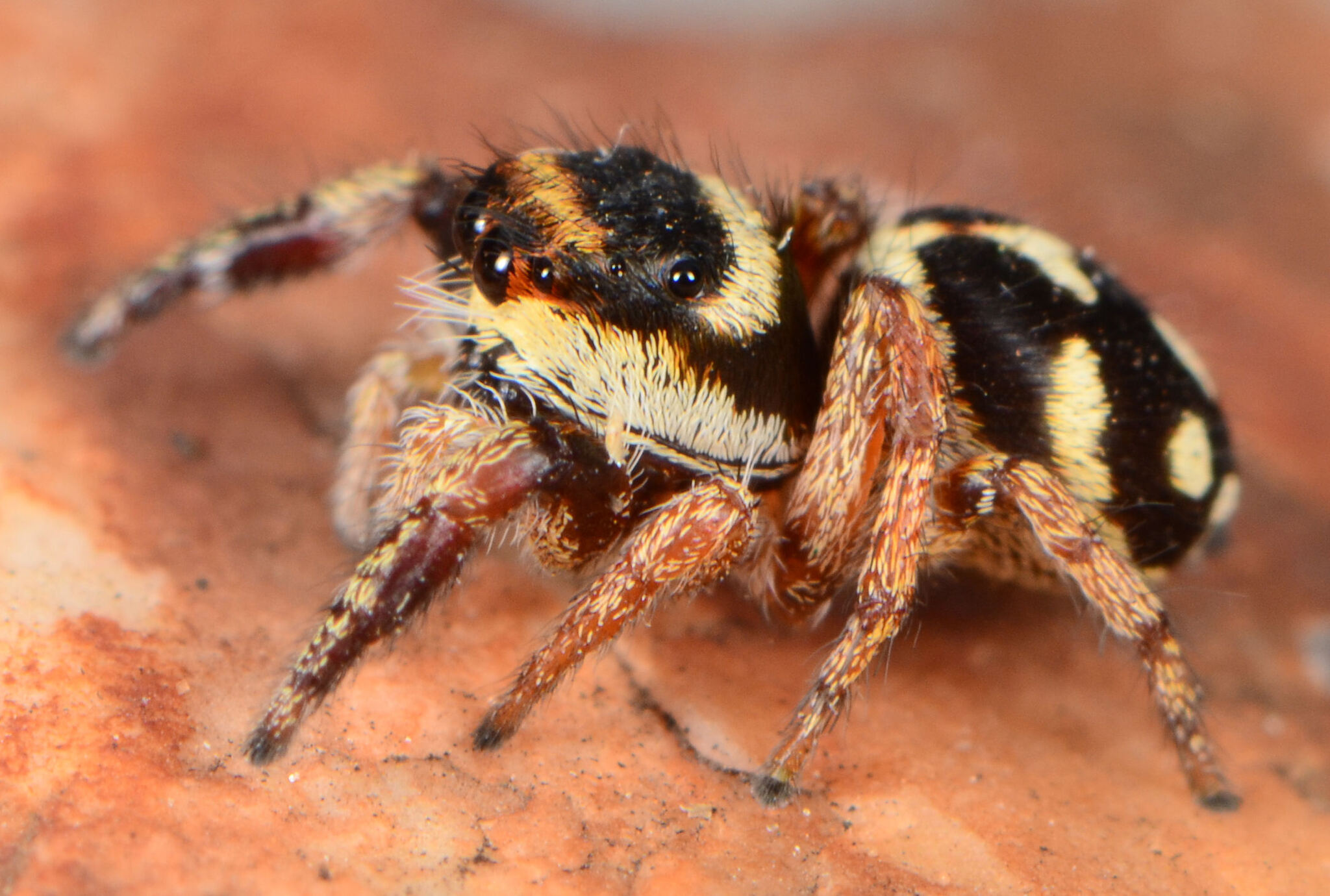
A female

Pellenes tharinae is a medium-sized spider. It has a body that is divided into two main parts: a cephalothorax and an abdomen. The male has a carapace, the hard upper part of the cephalothorax, that is between 1.3 and 1.7 mm (0.05 and 0.07 in) in length and between 1 and 1.3 mm (0.04 and 0.05 in) in width. It is dark brown, moderately high and covered in grey hairs. Its black eye field is bristly and marked with a white patch near the eyes themselves. The underside of its cephalothorax, or sternum, is brown. White hairs cover the part of the spider's face known as its clypeus. At the front of its head, its chelicerae are brown with white hairs at the bottom while its remaining mouthparts, including its brown labium and maxillae, have pale margins.

The male has an abdomen that is between 1.2 and 1.5 mm (0.05 and 0.06 in) in length and 0.9 and 1.1 mm (0.04 and 0.04 in) in width. It is generally dark brown and hairy with a thin pale stripe near the front, six white dots near the back and a white arrow in the middle. This arrow-like pattern is what most easily distinguishes the species from the otherwise similar Pellenes cingulatus. The underside of its abdomen is brownish, darker to the front. The spider's spinnerets, used for spinning webs, are also darker. Its front legs are brown with long black hairs. The remainder of the legs are dark yellow to light brown, and have brown leg hairs and spines.

The spider's reproductive system is similar to others in the genus. It has yellow pedipalps, sexual organs near the mouth, that end with a cymbium that is marked with a few white scales. Attached to the cymbium is a palpal bulb that has a narrow spike-like embolus projecting from it, which is accompanied by a thicker projection or apophysis that makes it look as if the spider has a double embolus. They curve, following the contour of the palpal bulb and do not project beyond the cymbium. At the base of its cymbium, the spider's palpal tibia has a pointed apophysis that has a wide base and a slight curve to its end.

The female is similar in size to the male, with a carapace between 1.5 and 1.6 mm (0.06 and 0.06 in) in length and 1.2 and 1.3 mm (0.05 and 0.05 in) in width and an abdomen between 1.3 and 2.1 mm (0.05 and 0.08 in) long and between 1 and 1.6 mm (0.06 in) wide. It has the same characteristic pattern on its abdomen. It is also similar in shape to the male but is generally larger. Its copulatory organs are again distinctive. Its epigyne, the external visible copulatory organ, has a pocket in the middle and two flaps that show evidence of sclerotization. The spider's copulatory openings open to short insemination ducts that lead to multi-chambered spermathecae, or receptacles.

== Distribution and habitat ==
Pellenes tharinae is known from Namibia, South Africa and Zimbabwe. The holotype was found in a gravel bed on the Brandberg Mountain in Namibia at an altitude of 2,000 m (6,600 ft) above sea level in 2000. Other specimen have been found in karoo nearby. It is amongst the most abundant species of spider living in the area.

In 2009, Wesołowska and Charles Haddad identified that female examples described in 1999 as Pellenes pulcher were of this species. This extended its species distribution to include Zimbabwe. At the same time they also listed the species as one of those that they had found living in the Ndumo Game Reserve in South Africa. This was the first time it had been seen in the country. It was found in plant litter under Vachellia tortilis trees. Subsequently, it was found in Free State. Examples were found in a range of environments, including the chimney of a termite mound. It has also been found living amongst plant litter in a forest of mopane trees. Its conservation status is considered of least concern.
