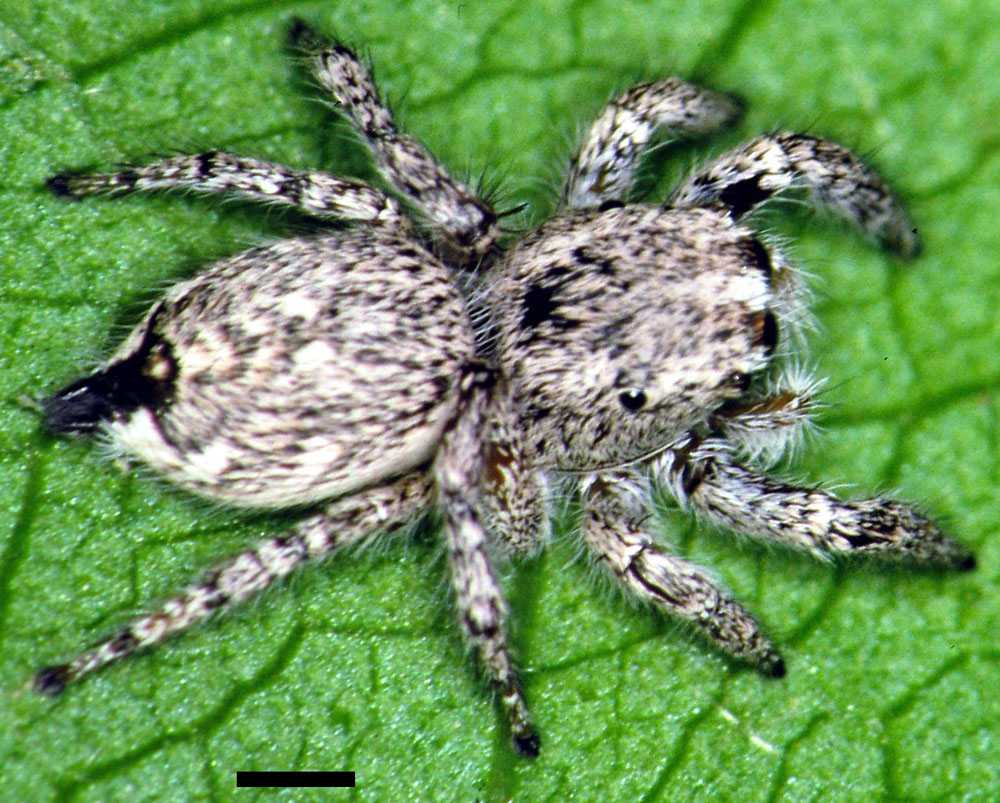
- Female Habronattus georgiensis from Seahorse Key, Levy County, Florida, USA

Scientific classification
- Kingdom: Animalia
- Phylum: Arthropoda
- Subphylum: Chelicerata
- Class: Arachnida
- Order: Araneae
- Infraorder: Araneomorphae
- Family: Salticidae
- Genus: Habronattus
- Species: H. georgiensis

Binomial name
- Habronattus georgiensis (Chamberlin & Ivie, 1944)

Synonyms
- Pellenes elegans georgiensis Chamberlin & Ivie, 1944

= Habronattus georgiensis =

Species of spider

Habronattus georgiensis is a species in the family Salticidae (jumping spiders), found in Georgia and the USA.
