= Pellenes vanharteni =

Scientific classification
- Kingdom: Animalia
- Phylum: Arthropoda
- Subphylum: Chelicerata
- Class: Arachnida
- Order: Araneae
- Infraorder: Araneomorphae
- Family: Salticidae
- Genus: Pellenes
- Species: P. vanharteni

Binomial name
- Pellenes vanharteni Wesołowska, 1998

Species of jumping spider

Pellenes vanharteni is a species of jumping spider that lives on the islands of Cape Verde, where it is one of the most abundant spiders. Named after the entomologist Antonius van Harten, the species is a very small spider with a dark brown carapace that is typically 1.3 mm (0.05 in) long and a yellowish-white abdomen typically 1.2 mm (0.05 in) long. There is a distinctive pattern on the abdomen that consists of two greyish-brown patches around a serrated central stripe that helps to distinguish the species from others in the genus. The underside of the spider is lighter than the top, the sternum being yellow. White hairs can be seen on the spider's clypeus. Its front legs are black and longer than the rest, which are also lighter. Although the female has not been described, the male looks as if it has a double narrow spike-like embolus.

== Taxonomy ==
Pellenes vanharteni is a species of jumping spider, a member of the family Salticidae, that was first described by the arachnologist Wanda Wesołowska in 1998. She allocated the spider to the genus Pellenes, which had been first circumscribed in 1876 by Eugène Simon. The species is named after the entomologist Antonius van Harten. In 2000, Dmitri Logunov and Yuri Marusik divided the genus Pellenes into four subgenera, based on the shape of the male palpal bulb.

Wayne Maddison placed the genus Pellenes in the subtribe Harmochirina in the tribe Plexippini in 2015. This had previously been known as Harmochireae, as circumscribed by Simon in 1903. It is allocated to the subclade Saltafresia in the clade Salticoida. It is a member of Plexippoida. In 2016, Jerzy Prószyński grouped the genus with Dexippus under the name Pelenines, named after the genus. It is allocated to the supergroup Hylloida. Phylogenetic analysis of molecular data demonstrates that the genus is most closely related to Habronattus and Havaika.

== Description ==
Pellenes vanharteni is a very small spider. It has a body which is divided into two main parts: a convex swollen cephalothorax and a narrower abdomen. The male has a carapace, the hard upper part of the cephalothorax, that is typically 1.3 mm (0.05 in) long, 1.1 mm (0.04 in) wide and 0.7 mm (0.03 in) high. It is dark brown, moderately high. The black eye field is marked and has long brown hairs near some of the eyes. The underside, or sternum, is yellow. There are white hairs on the clypeus. The mouthparts, including the chelicerae, labium and maxillae, are brown. There are two teeth in the front and one in the back.

The spider has an abdomen that is typically 1.2 mm (0.05 in) long and 1.9 mm (0.07 in) wide. It is generally yellowish-white with a greyish-brown pattern on the top. It consists of an almost-symmetrical set of markings with a serrated lighter stripe down the middle that is lined by two darker patches that have a bump on the outside, This pattern helps to distinguish the spider from others in the genus. The underside is lighter than the topside. Its front legs are black, longer than the others and have white scales on some of the segments. The second legs are yellow and the remainder are also pale. All the legs have brown hair. Its pedipalps, sensual organs near the mouth, are light, with only the femora having a darker hue

The spider's reproductive system is similar to others in the genus. The male has a neat semi-spherical cymbium and a smaller but similarly shaped palpal bulb. There is a narrow spike-like embolus projecting from it, which is accompanied by a membrane or apophysis that makes it look as if the spider has a double embolus. They curve, following the contour of the palpal bulb and do not project beyond the cymbium. The palpal tibia has a rounded apophysis that has a wide base and a slight curve to its end. The female has not been described.

== Distribution and habitat ==
Pellenes vanharteni is endemic to Cape Verde. It was first found on the island of Sal. The holotype was found near Santa Maria in 1988. Other examples have been found on the island of Maio. They were collected between May and September. It is amongst the most abundant species of spider living in the archipelago.
