= Pellenes obvolutus =

Scientific classification
- Kingdom: Animalia
- Phylum: Arthropoda
- Subphylum: Chelicerata
- Class: Arachnida
- Order: Araneae
- Infraorder: Araneomorphae
- Family: Salticidae
- Genus: Pellenes
- Species: P. obvolutus

Binomial name
- Pellenes obvolutus Dawidowicz & Wesołowska, 2016

Species of spider

Pellenes obvolutus is a species of jumping spider in the genus Pellenes that lives on Mount Elgon in Kenya. The spider has been found in savanna and grassland. It is a hairy medium-sized spider with a carapace that is between 2.1 and 2.4 mm (0.08 and 0.09 in) long and an abdomen between 2 and 3.9 mm (0.08 and 0.15 in) long. The female is larger than the male and has a different pattern on its abdomen. It also has lighter legs. The spider's copulatory organs are distinctive. The male has an embolus that is wrapped inside an apophysis that projects from the palpal bulb. It is this feature that gives the spider its specific name, which is the Latin word for "wrapped". The female has a deep depression in the middle of its epigyne. The species was first described in 2016.

== Taxonomy ==
Pellenes obvolutus is a species of jumping spider, a member of the family Salticidae. The species was first described by Angelika Dawidowicz and Wanda Wesołowska in 2016. They allocated the spider to the genus Pellenes, which had been first circumscribed in 1876 by Eugène Simon. The species is named after a Latin word that can be translated "wrapped" and relates to the way that the male spider's embolus is wrapped inside an extension that projects from the palpal bulb.

The spider is a member of Plexippoida. In 2015, Wayne Maddison placed the genus Pellenes in the subtribe Harmochirina in the tribe Plexippini. This had previously been known as Harmochireae, as circumscribed by Simon in 1903. It is allocated to the subclade Saltafresia in the clade Salticoida. Phylogenetic analysis of molecular data demonstrates that the genus is most closely related to Habronattus and Havaika. In 2016, Jerzy Prószyński grouped the genus with Dexippus under the name Pelenines, named after the genus. It is allocated to the supergroup Hylloida.

== Description ==
Pellenes obvolutus is a hairy medium-sized spider. It has a body is divided into two oval parts: a cephalothorax and a darker abdomen. The male has a moderately high carapace, the hard upper part of the cephalothorax, that is between 2.1 and 2.2 mm (0.08 and 0.09 in) in length and between 1.5 and 1.6 mm (0.06 and 0.06 in) in width. It is dark brown to black and covered in colourless hairs. There are bands of light scales at the back of the carapace. The eye field is blackish and covered in transparent scales and long brown bristles. Some of the eyes are surrounded by light scales. The underside, or sternum, is dark brown and marked by light scales with colourless hairs. White hairs and scales cover the high clypeus, and extend onto the chelicerae. The remainder of the mouthparts, the brown labium and maxillae, have lighter tips.

The male has an abdomen that is between 2 mm (0.08 in) and 2.2 mm in length and between 1.4 mm (0.06 in) and 1.5 mm in width. It is dark brown or black with a metallic sheen with some specimens having a pattern of white scales. It is covered in long dark hairs. The underside is plain and dark brown. The spider's spinnerets are dark. Its legs are brown with dense long brown leg hairs and white scales.

The spider's copulatory organs are distinctive. Its pedipalps are dark brown and covered in brown and whitish bristles. The cymbium is simple in shape and encloses the palpal bulb, which is a simple oval with a bulge at the rear. The embolus is hard to see as it is hidden in a thicker projection or apophysis that projects from the palpal bulb. This distinguishes the spider from others in the genus. The palpal tibia has a short apophysis.

The female is larger than the male, with a carapace between 2.1 and 2.4 mm (0.09 in) long and between 1.8 and 1.9 mm (0.07 and 0.07 in) wide and an abdomen between 2.7 and 3.9 mm (0.11 and 0.15 in) in length and between 2 and 2.9 mm (0.11 in) in width. It is similar in shape to the male but is generally lighter. The top of its abdomen is marked with two lines of white scales that make slightly arched streaks. The bottom of the abdomen has a pattern of four belts that run from the front to the back. Its legs are light brown. Its copulatory organs are distinctive. The epigyne lacks the ridge down the middle of the central pocket that is typical for Pellenes spiders. Instead, there is a deep depression in the middle and two pockets that lie to the sides. There are two copulatory openings that open to wide insemination ducts. These narrow as they travel and lead to multi-chambered spermathecae, or receptacles.

== Distribution and habitat ==
Pellenes spiders can be found across the Afrotropical, Holarctic and Indomalayan realms. Pellenes obvolutus is endemic to Kenya. The female holotype was found during 1948 living on Mount Elgon at an altitude of 2,000 m (6,600 ft) above sea level. Other specimens have been collected in the local area. The spider lives in savanna and grassland, often in areas with Combretum trees. It is not known in any other areas of the country.
