= Pellenes marionis =

Scientific classification
- Kingdom: Animalia
- Phylum: Arthropoda
- Subphylum: Chelicerata
- Class: Arachnida
- Order: Araneae
- Infraorder: Araneomorphae
- Family: Salticidae
- Genus: Pellenes
- Species: P. marionis

Binomial name
- Pellenes marionis (Schmidt & Krause, 1994)

Synonyms
- Bianor marionis Schmidt & Krause, 1994

Species of spider

Pellenes marionis is a species of jumping spiders. They are found in the island of Sal, Cape Verde. The species was first described by Joachim Schmidt and Otto Krause in 1994 as Bianor marionis. It was transferred to the genus Pellenes by D. V. Logunov in 2001.
