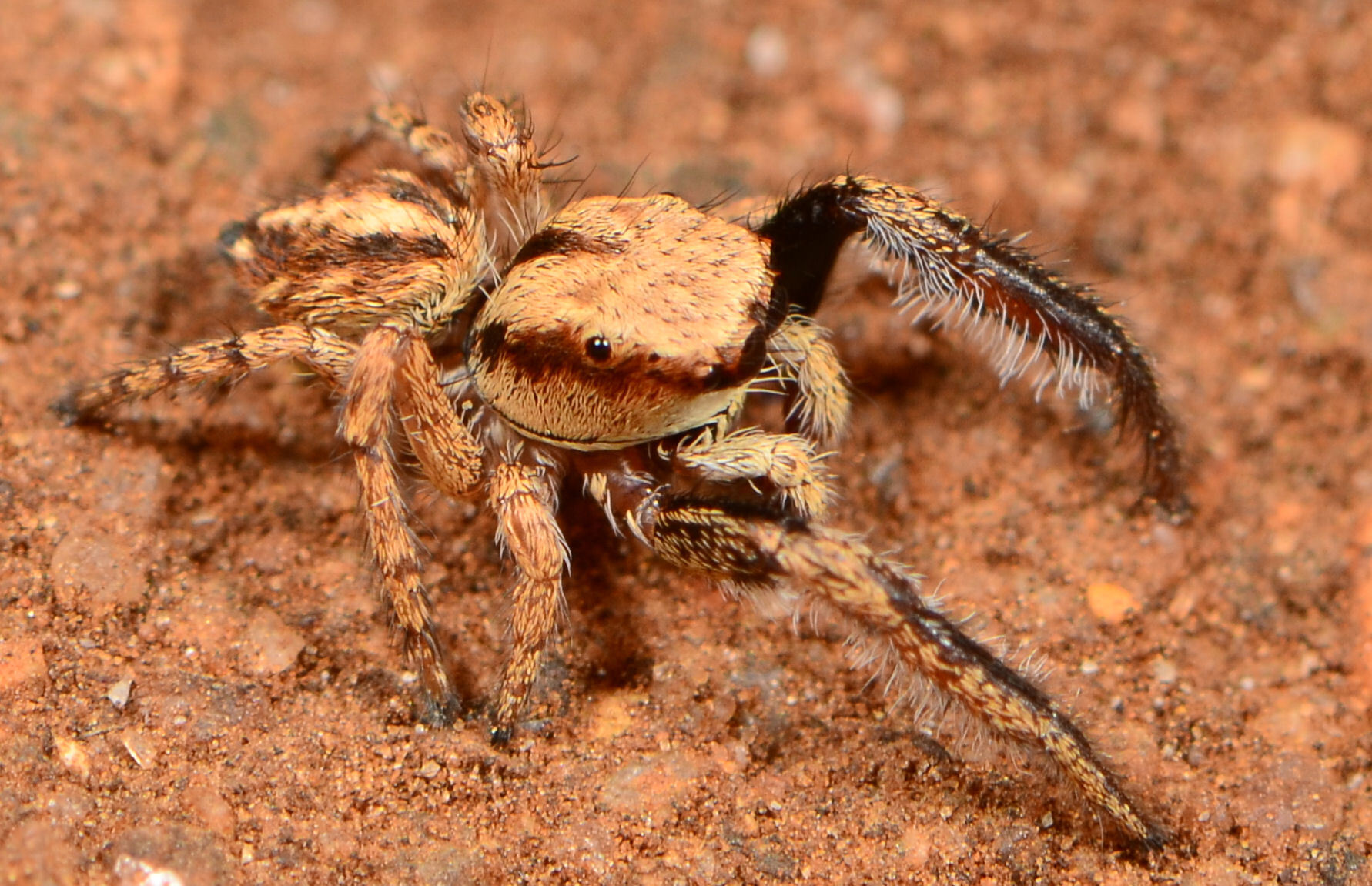
- male
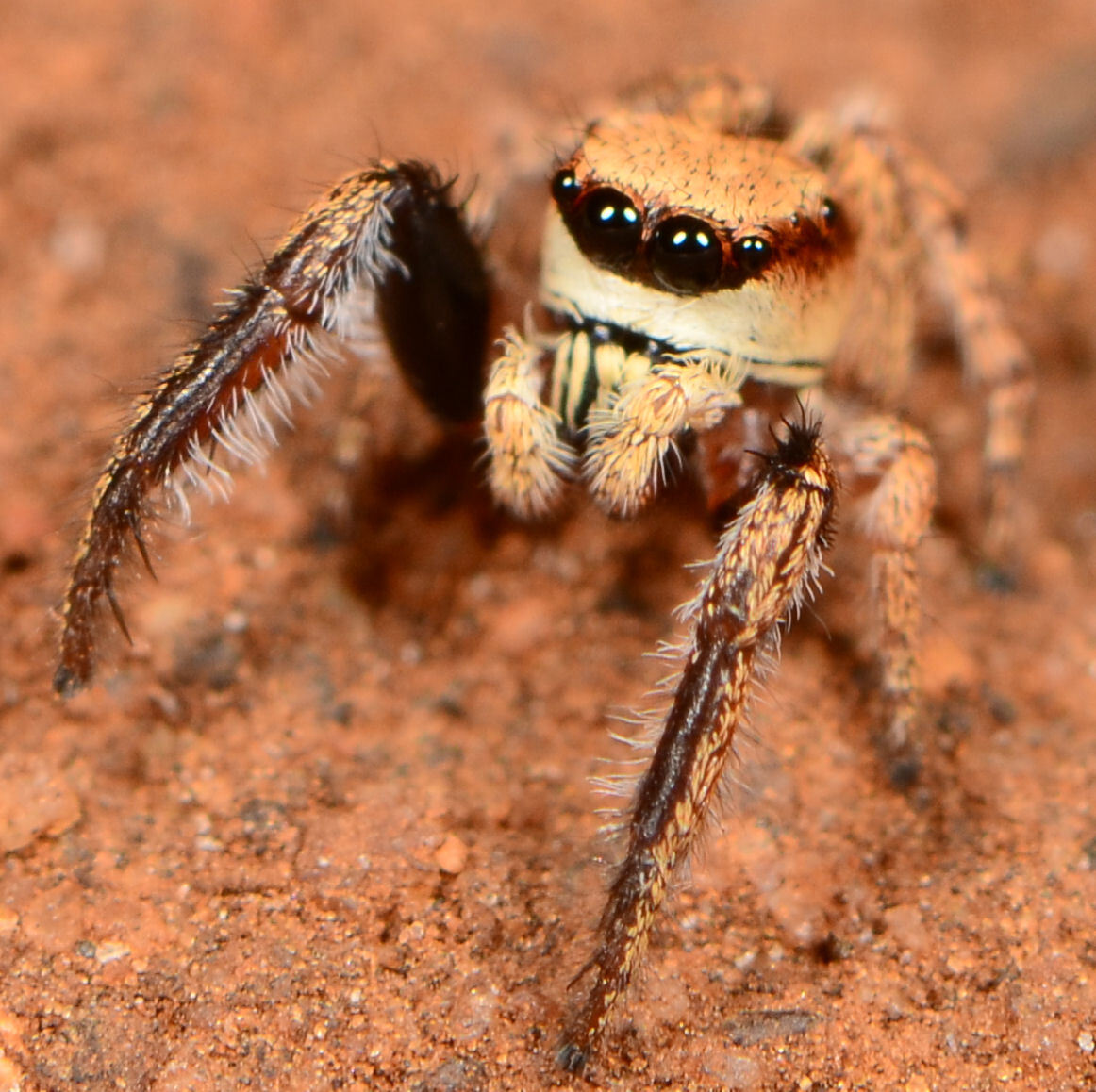
- male

Scientific classification
- Kingdom: Animalia
- Phylum: Arthropoda
- Subphylum: Chelicerata
- Class: Arachnida
- Order: Araneae
- Infraorder: Araneomorphae
- Family: Salticidae
- Genus: Pellenes
- Species: P. modicus

Binomial name
- Pellenes modicus Wesołowska & Russell-Smith, 2000

= Pellenes modicus =

Species of spider

Pellenes modicus is a species of jumping spider that lives in grassland and woodland dominated by species like Searsia lancea and Senegalia senegal. First identified in the Mkomazi National Park in Tanzania, the spider has also been found living in Free State, South Africa and in Uganda. It is a hairy medium-sized spider with a carapace that is between 2.6 and 3.1 mm (0.10 and 0.12 in) long and an abdomen between 2.4 and 3.4 mm (0.09 and 0.13 in) long. There is a marking of chevrons on its abdomen and the front legs of the male are longer and thicker than the rest. Externally, the copulatory organs are typical for the genus, particularly the female's, but internally they have a distinctive design, including gonopores that lie in fissures and three-chambered spermathecae. The male was first described in 2000 and the female in 2011.

== Taxonomy ==
Pellenes modicus is a species of jumping spider, a member of the family Salticidae. The male of the species was first described by Wanda Wesołowska and Anthony Russell-Smith in 2000. The female was not described until 2011. Wesołowska and Russell-Smith allocated the spider to the genus Pellenes, which had been first circumscribed in 1876 by Eugène Simon. The species is named after a Latin word that can be translated "quiet".

== Description ==
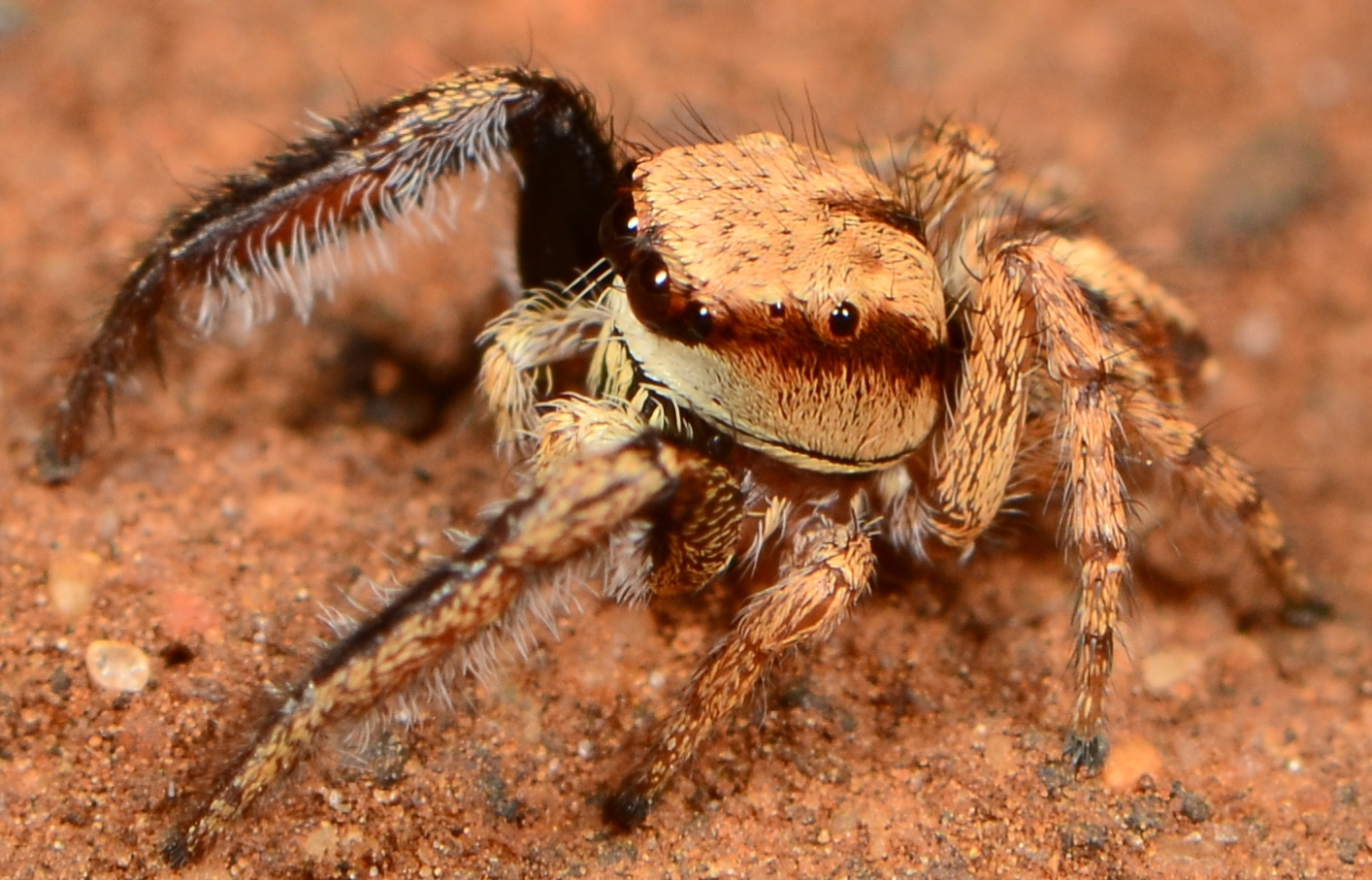
male

Pellenes modicus is a hairy medium-sized spider. It has a body is divided into two main parts: a cephalothorax and an abdomen. The male has a carapace, the hard upper part of the cephalothorax, that is between 2.6 and 3.1 mm (0.10 and 0.12 in) in length and between 1.9 mm (0.07 in) and 2.6 mm in width. It is a high or moderately high oval that is light brown or brown with a covering of light hairs, interspersed with a small number of darker hairs. The area around the eyes is darker. The underside, or sternum, is light brown or brown with darker edges. There are white scales on the sides. White hairs cover the clypeus while the mouthparts are light brown. The chelicerae are long and dark brown, marked with three white lines. The labium is also dark brown. The male has an abdomen that is between 2.4 and 3.4 mm (0.09 and 0.13 in) in length and between 1.8 and 2.3 mm (0.07 and 0.09 in) in width.

It is an oval with a brownish grey topside that has marking made of lighter chevrons running down the middle. It is covered in dense The underside is yellowish. The spider's spinnerets are yellow. Its front legs are darker, longer and thicker than the rest, the remainder either brown or yellow, with brown leg hairs and spines.

The spider's reproductive system is similar to others in the genus. It has light brown or yellowish pedipalps. The palpal bulb is an oval that has a needle-like embolus projecting from it, which follows the route of a thicker projection or apophysis, that fits in between. The palpal tibia has an apophysis that shows strong sclerotization and extends into a large indentation in the cymbium.

The female is similar in size to the male, with a carapace typically 2.7 mm (0.11 in) long and 2 mm (0.08 in) wide and an abdomen typically 3.3 mm (0.13 in) long and 2 mm wide. It is also similar in shape. The carapace is darker, nearly black, and is covered with white hairs apart from near the eyes, where brown hairs can be found. The sternum is brown, as is the labium is brown, although the latter has light tips.

The abdomen is very dark on top with a pattern of yellow chevrons running from the front to the back. It has mottled sides and a yellowish underside that is marked with three darker stripes. The spinnerets are also darker than the male's. The forelegs are less broad and all the legs are mainly greyish-brown, although there are areas of light yellow and black visible. As is typical for the genus, the epigyne has a pocket in the middle. The internal structure of the copulatory organs are, however, distinctive. The gonopores are placed in narrow fissures and there are very visible accessory glands. The spermathecae, or receptacles have three chambers.

== Distribution and habitat ==
Pellenes modicus is known fromn South Africa, Tanzania and Uganda. The holotype was found living amongst Senegalia senegal trees between Ndeya and Mbula in Mkomazi National Park during 1994. It has also been found near Mount Elgon in Uganda. In South Africa, it is known across Free State, living in grassland and in woodland dominated by Searsia lancea.
