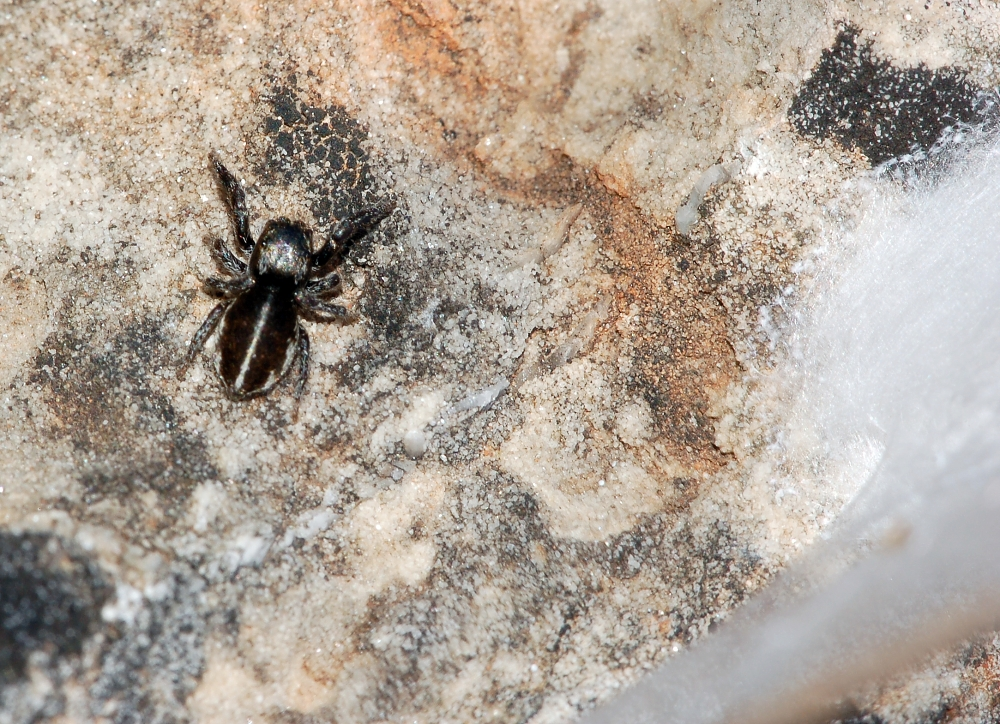
- Female Pellenes brevis seen in France in 2008

Scientific classification
- Kingdom: Animalia
- Phylum: Arthropoda
- Subphylum: Chelicerata
- Class: Arachnida
- Order: Araneae
- Infraorder: Araneomorphae
- Family: Salticidae
- Genus: Pellenes
- Species: P. brevis

Binomial name
- Pellenes brevis (Simon, 1868)

= Pellenes brevis =

Species of spider

Pellenes brevis is a species of jumping spider in the genus Pellenes. Initially named Attus brevis, the species was first identified in 1878 in France and Spain. It has subsequently been found in many countries in southern Europe and western Asia from Portugal to Iran. The spider is very dark brown or black, with a distinctive white semi-circle marking on the abdomen. The female is larger than the male, measuring up to 5.3 millimetres (0.21 in) in length. It lays its eggs in snail shells.

== Taxonomy ==
Originally allocated to the genus Attus as Attus brevis, the species was first identified by Eugène Simon in 1868. It was moved by Simon to the genus Pellenes in 1878.

== Description ==
The spider has a very dark brown or black body with a slight golden tinge. The abdomen is black, with a white semi-circle marking at the front. It has black thighs and brown legs, the front legs looking swollen and the third legs thin and long. The female is larger at between 4.6 and 5.3 millimetres (0.18 and 0.21 in) long, compared to the male that is between 3.65 and 3.8 millimetres (0.144 and 0.150 in) long. The male has a brown carapace that is typically 1.85 millimetres (0.073 in) long and 1.35 millimetres (0.053 in) wide and abdomen 1.78 millimetres (0.070 in) long. The female carapace is typically 2.33 millimetres (0.092 in) long and 1.83 millimetres (0.072 in) wide and abdomen 3.08 millimetres (0.121 in) long and 2.20 millimetres (0.087 in).wide.

The species is similar to other members of genus, differing in details. For example, it can be differentiated from Pellenes allegrii by the size of the embolus in the male and the shape and size of the central blind-ending pocket in the female, and from Pellenes pseudobrevis by the female genitalia and male pedipalps.

== Distribution ==
Pellenes brevis has an extensive range across southern Europe into western Asia. It was first identified in Auvergne and Vaucluse in France and Guadarrama in Spain. The species has been subsequently found across Europe in Cyprus, Germany, Greece, Italy, Macedonia, Portugal, Turkey and Ukraine. Other examples have been found in Bulgaria and Poland. It was the twenty-first species in the genus to be identified in the ex-Soviet Union. The furthest East that it has been found is in Crimea and Tehran, Iran.

== Habits ==
The species is known to lay, and guard, its eggs in snail shells.
