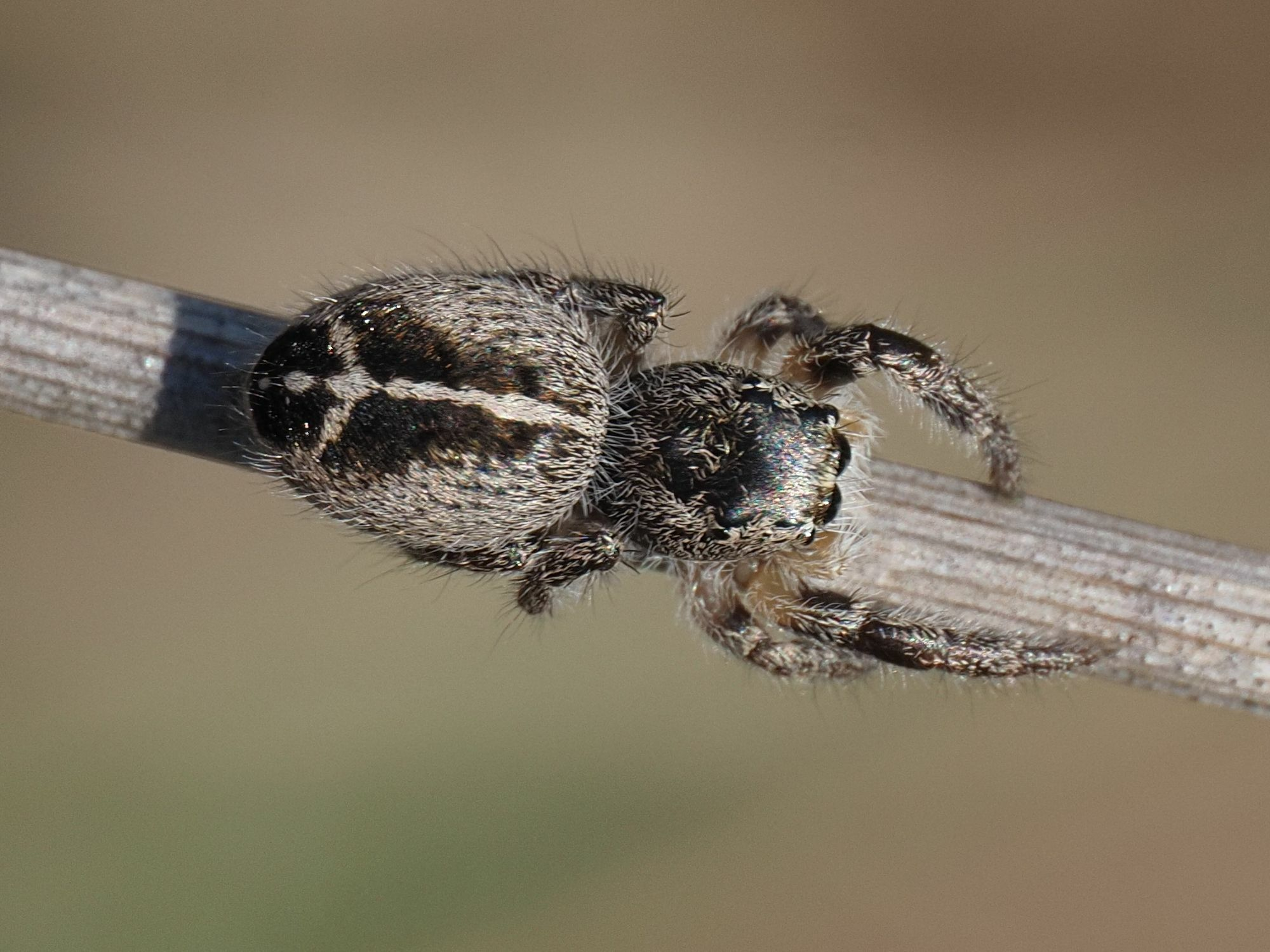
- female from Austria
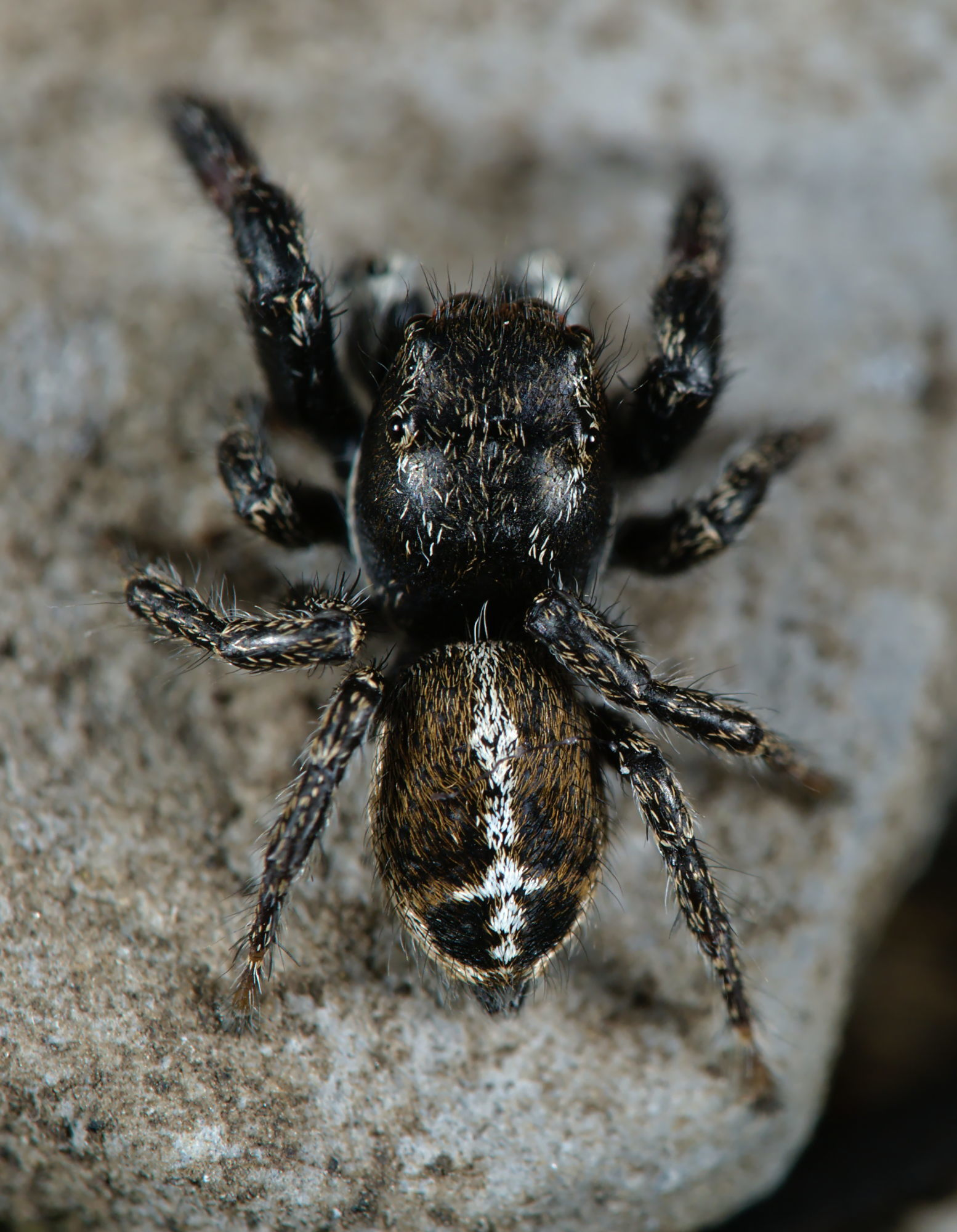
- male from Belgium

Scientific classification
- Kingdom: Animalia
- Phylum: Arthropoda
- Subphylum: Chelicerata
- Class: Arachnida
- Order: Araneae
- Infraorder: Araneomorphae
- Family: Salticidae
- Genus: Pellenes
- Species: P. tripunctatus

Binomial name
- Pellenes tripunctatus (Walckenaer, 1802)

Synonyms
- Aranea tripunctata Walckenaer, 1802; Aranea psylla Walckenaer, 1802; Attus tripunctatus Walckenaer, 1805; Attus crucigerus Walckenaer, 1805; Salticus ater Risso, 1826; Salticus crux Hahn, 1832; Attus crucifer Sundevall, 1833; Attus rufifrons Sundevall, 1833; Euophrys crucifera C. L. Koch, 1837; Pales crucigera C. L. Koch, 1850; Hasarius cruciger Sørensen, 1904

= Pellenes tripunctatus =

Species of spider

Pellenes tripunctatus is a species of jumping spider from the Palearctic region. It is the type species of the genus Pellenes.

The specific name tripunctatus is derived from Latin, meaning "three-spotted," referring to the distinctive markings on the spider's opisthosoma.

== Distribution ==
P. tripunctatus is widely distributed across the Palearctic region, with records from Europe, the Caucasus, Central Asia, and China. In the British Isles, it has a restricted distribution and is considered rare, being recorded primarily from coastal shingle habitats in Kent and Dorset.

== Habitat ==
The species is found in mountainous grassland areas. In Europe, C. L. Koch noted that mature males are fully developed in May and June, and the species is commonly found on the ground or under stones, where it maintains a soft, narrow but dense silken retreat.

== Description ==
female

male

Pellenes tripunctatus exhibits pronounced sexual dimorphism in size and coloration. Based on Chinese specimens, females measure 7.2 mm in body length while males are smaller at 5.7 mm.

=== Female ===
The female has a black cephalothorax with a short white hair covering in the cephalic region. The posterior eye row is positioned at the front half of the cephalothorax length. The clypeus region is yellowish-white with sparse white short hairs, and its height is smaller than the diameter of the anterior median eyes.

The chelicerae are brown, equal in length to the width, with brown pedipalps and yellowish terminal segments that are elliptical and bear hair tufts. The sternum is dark brown with the anterior margin having one tooth and the posterior margin lacking teeth. The legs are yellowish without markings.

The opisthosoma is brown with black edges and bears long white hairs. The dorsal surface is dark brown to black, approximately equal in length to the cephalothorax, with yellowish-black alternating longitudinal stripes on both sides. The posterior central region has 2-3 small yellowish round spots. The ventral surface is yellowish with the external genital opening forming a "品" (tripod) shape.

=== Male ===
Males are smaller and darker than females. The opisthosoma has a yellowish-brown central area ventrally with four dotted longitudinal stripes, while the sides show a grayish-brown reticulated pattern. The palpal bulb has a rod-shaped tibial process with two projections at the base outside the attachment point. Other characteristics are similar to the female.

== Behavior and ecology ==
P. tripunctatus exhibits remarkable overwintering behavior, regularly using empty land snail shells as winter retreats. This behavior is shared with closely related species P. nigrociliatus and Attulus penicillatus. Research has documented unusual aggregation behavior, with up to six individuals (five females and one male) recorded overwintering together in a single shell, suggesting potential social behavior that is uncommon among jumping spiders.

The species uses these shells not only for overwintering but also for various life activities including molting, mating, and egg-laying. Females prefer barren soil environments with pieces of herbs or grasses present, where they can hang shells for egg laying and as retreats for the next generation.

== Behavior and ecology ==
Based on observations in Germany, the species constructs soft, narrow but dense silken retreats under stones. The spiders maintain an ordinary body form and are commonly encountered in their terrestrial microhabitats.

== Taxonomy ==
The species was originally described by Walckenaer in 1802 as Aranea tripunctata. C. L. Koch provided a detailed redescription in 1846 under the name Euophrys crucifera, noting potential confusion with Salticus crux Hahn. The species serves as the type species for the genus Pellenes, established by Simon in 1876.
