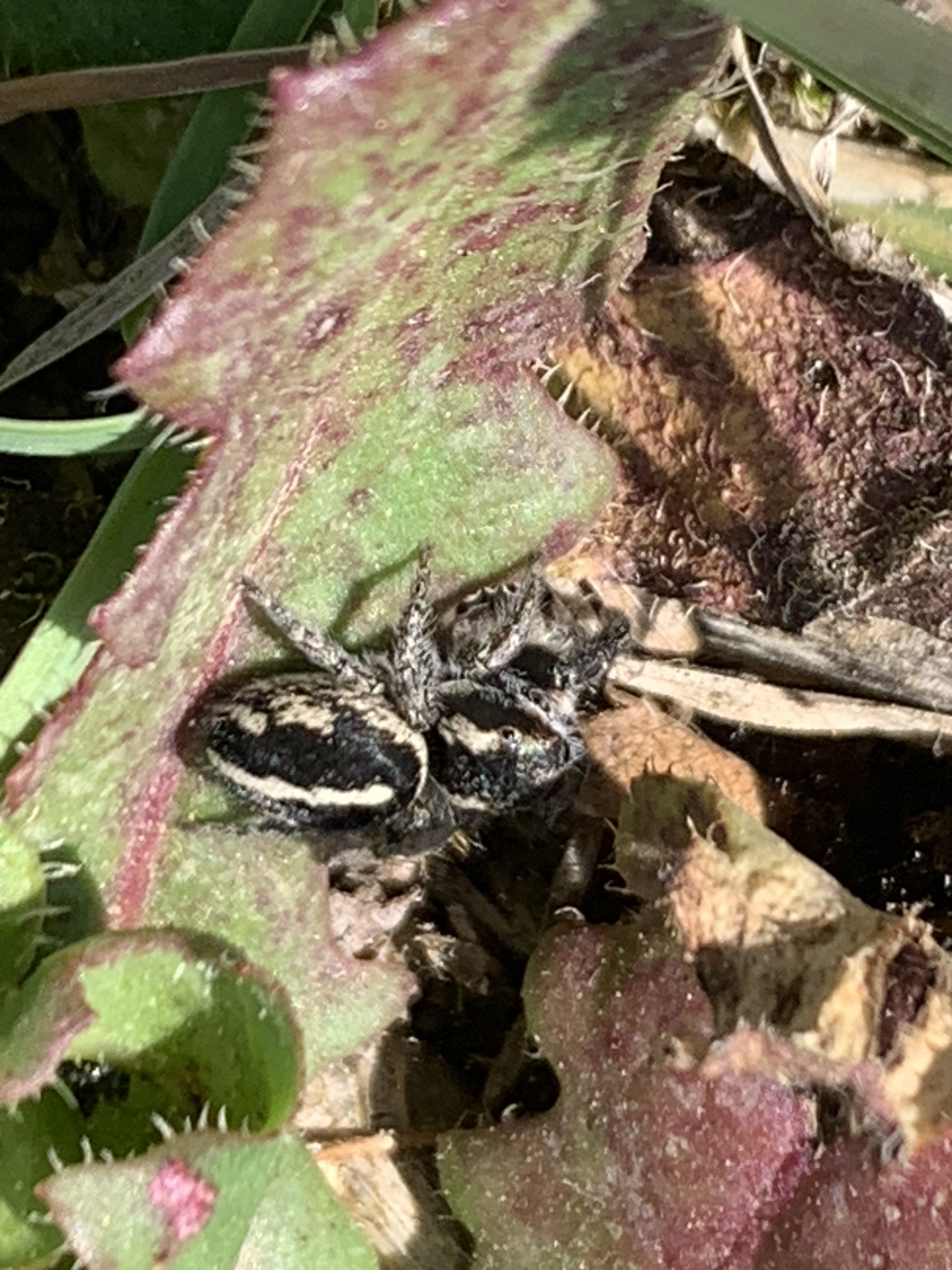
- female from France
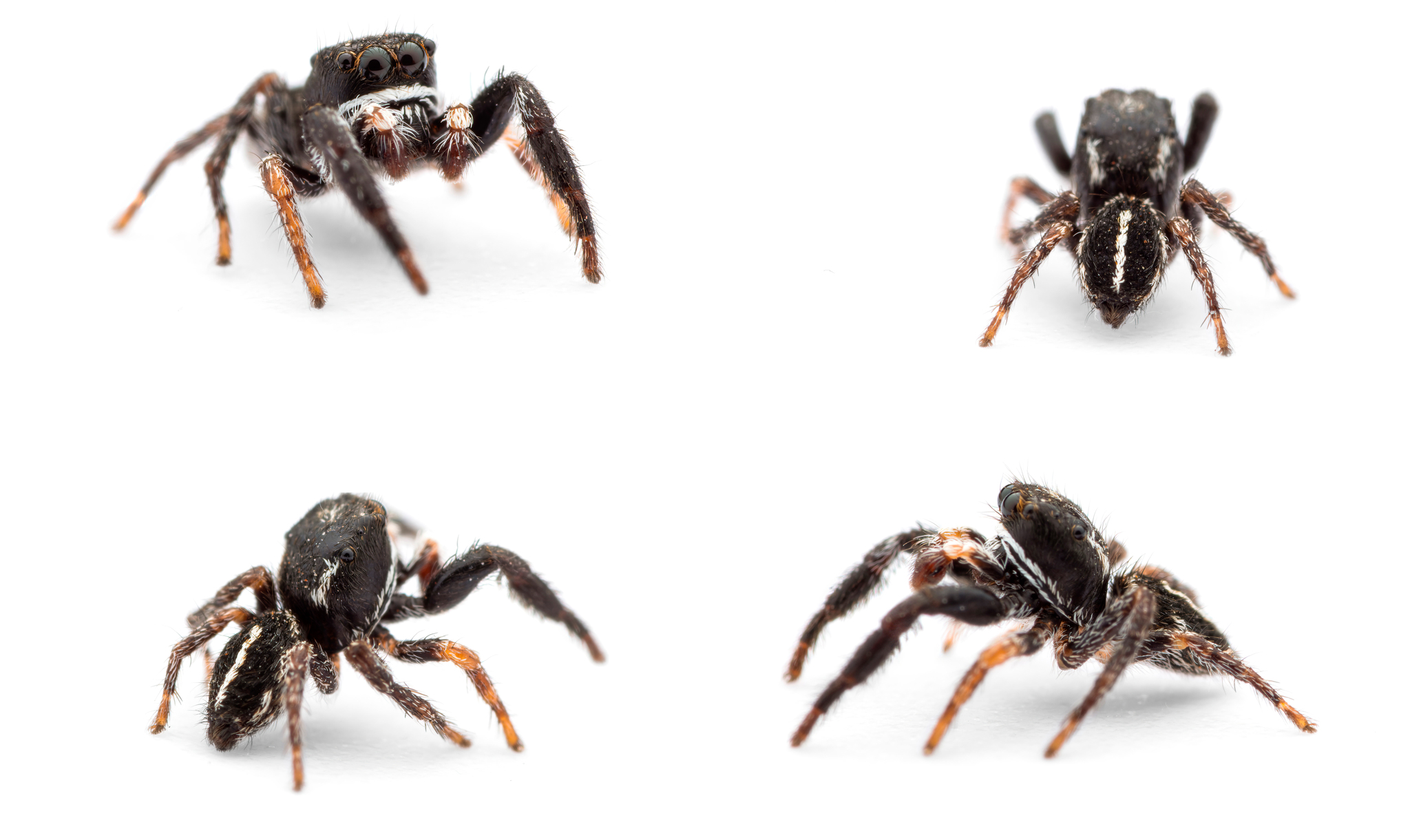
- male from Spain

Scientific classification
- Kingdom: Animalia
- Phylum: Arthropoda
- Subphylum: Chelicerata
- Class: Arachnida
- Order: Araneae
- Infraorder: Araneomorphae
- Family: Salticidae
- Genus: Pellenes
- Species: P. arciger

Binomial name
- Pellenes arciger (Walckenaer, 1837)

Synonyms
- Attus arcigerus Walckenaer, 1837; Dia arcigerus (Walckenaer, 1837); Euophrys arcigera (Walckenaer, 1837); Attus semi-ater Simon, 1868

= Pellenes arciger =

Species of jumping spider

Pellenes arciger is a species of jumping spider of the genus Pellenes. It is found throughout Southern Europe, including the Canary Islands, and in Algeria and Armenia.

== Etymology ==
The species name arciger derives from Latin, meaning "bow-bearing" or "archer," likely referring to the curved white markings on the spider's opisthosoma.

== Distribution ==
P. arciger is distributed across Southern Europe, including France, Spain, Italy, Greece, Croatia, Bulgaria, and Crete. It also occurs in Algeria, Armenia, and the Canary Islands.

== Habitat ==
The species inhabits dry, warm environments typical of the Mediterranean region. It is commonly found in rocky areas, dry grasslands, and on stony substrates where it can be observed on surfaces or under stones.

== Description ==
Like many jumping spiders, Pellenes arciger exhibits distinct sexual dimorphism in both size and coloration patterns.

=== Female ===
Females are larger than males, with a body length of 4.2–4.4 mm. The cephalothorax pattern resembles that of males, with a white longitudinal stripe between the anterior median eyes. The opisthosoma shows similar coloration to males but with the white diagonal bands appearing more separated laterally.

The epigyne presents two small lateral fossae (depressions) that are rounded and separated by a smooth, convex ridge. This structure expands posteriorly to form an obtusely triangular configuration.

=== Male ===
Males have a body length of approximately 3.15 mm. The cephalothorax is dark brown to black with darker sides and black margins. The clypeus is covered with white hairs forming a distinct white band. A characteristic triangular or rounded white patch appears on the cephalic region, with two white longitudinal bands extending from the dorsal eyes, slightly divergent and widening posteriorly.

The opisthosoma is dark brown dorsally, featuring a prominent white equatorial band around the anterior third that continues posteriorly as four lateral diagonal white bands. The pedipalps are light-colored with white hairs, though the base of the femur and cymbium are brown with dark bristles.
