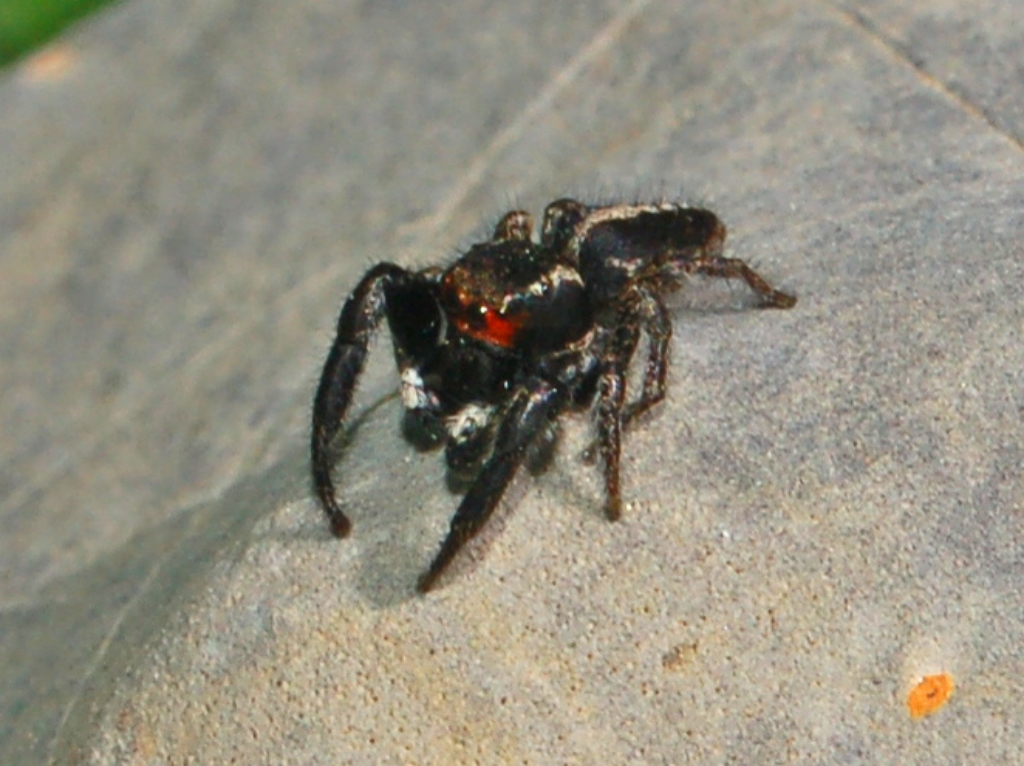
- Pellenes seriatus, male, side view

Scientific classification
- Kingdom: Animalia
- Phylum: Arthropoda
- Subphylum: Chelicerata
- Class: Arachnida
- Order: Araneae
- Infraorder: Araneomorphae
- Family: Salticidae
- Genus: Pellenes
- Species: P. seriatus

Binomial name
- Pellenes seriatus (Thorell, 1875)

= Pellenes seriatus =

Species of spider

Pellenes seriatus is a species of 'jumping spiders' belonging to the family Salticidae.

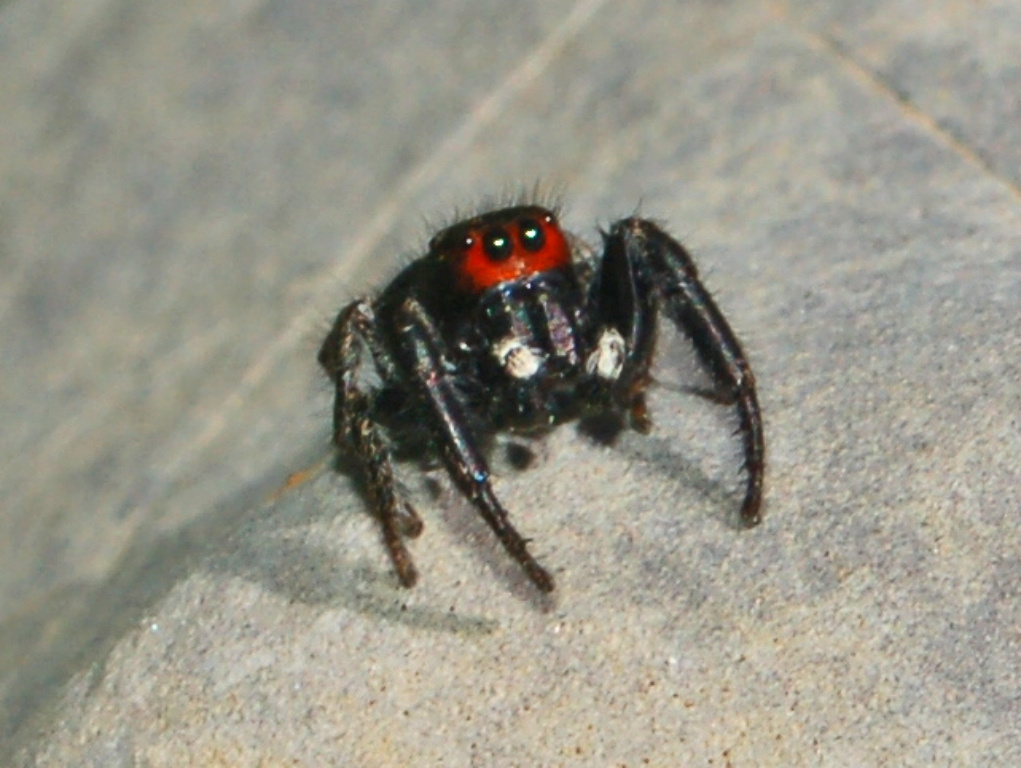
Pellenes seriatus - male, frontal view

This species is mainly present in most of Europe. The adults of these spiders reach approximately 6–7 millimetres (0.24–0.28 in) of length and can mainly be encountered on the bark of trees, on sunny rocks and in grasslands.

The males of this species frontally look very similar to Pellenes lapponicus and to Hasarius adansoni. In males the basic color of the hairy body is black, with a white longitudinal stripe on the middle of the opistosoma and a bright red mask on the eyes. The color of the opistosoma may be black or dark brownish. The pedipalps have whitish tips, while the legs are wholly black. In the females the red mask is missing. These spiders have eight eyes with very large anterior median eyes and smaller on each side. Their eyesight is excellent.
