= Pellenes cingulatus =

Scientific classification
- Kingdom: Animalia
- Phylum: Arthropoda
- Subphylum: Chelicerata
- Class: Arachnida
- Order: Araneae
- Infraorder: Araneomorphae
- Family: Salticidae
- Genus: Pellenes
- Species: P. cingulatus

Binomial name
- Pellenes cingulatus Wesołowska & Russell-Smith, 2000

Species of spider

Pellenes cingulatus is a species of jumping spider known from Tanzania. It is a hairy medium-sized spider with a carapace that is between 1.8 and 1.9 mm (0.07 and 0.07 in) long and an abdomen between 2 and 2.1 mm (0.08 and 0.08 in) long. The female is darker than the male and has a different white pattern on its abdomen. The male is marked with steaks and stripes while the female also has three patches near the spinnerets. The front legs of the male are darker and the third leg is longer and thicker than the rest. Externally, the copulatory organs are typical for the genus, particularly the female's. Internally they have a distinctive design, including multi-chambered spermathecae. The male copulatory organs include what looks like a double embolus as there is a thicker projection or apophysis that accompanies the actual embolus. The species was first described in 2000.

== Taxonomy ==
Pellenes cingulatus is a species of jumping spider, a member of the family Salticidae. The species was first described by Wanda Wesołowska and Anthony Russell-Smith in 2000. Wesołowska and Russell-Smith allocated the spider to the genus Pellenes, which had been first circumscribed in 1876 by Eugène Simon. The species is named after a Latin word that can be translated "striped".

== Description ==
Pellenes cingulatus is a hairy medium-sized spider. It has a body is divided into two main parts: a cephalothorax and an abdomen. The male has a carapace, the hard upper part of the cephalothorax, that is typically 1.9 mm (0.07 in) in length and 1.6 mm (0.06 in) in width. It is dark brown and covered short greyish hairs. The eye field is lighter with an orange area and brown bristles around the eyes themselves. The underside, or sternum, is brown. White hairs cover the clypeus. The chelicerae are brown and have white hairs at the bottom while the brown labium and maxillae have pale margins.

The male has an abdomen that is typically 2 mm (0.08 in) in length and 1.6 mm in width. It is brown and hairy with a marking of two white streaks crossing the middle and a stripe down the middle at the back. The underside is plain. The spider's spinnerets are similar, although the forward ones are lighter than those behind them. Its front legs are dark brown, the remainder orange, and all have brown leg hairs and spines. The third legs are the longest.

The spider's reproductive system is similar to others in the genus. It has orange pedipalps. The palpal bulb is a simple oval that has a narrow spike-like embolus projecting from it, which is accompanied by a thicker projection or apophysis that makes it look as if the spider has a double embolus. It projects slightly beyond the cymbium. The palpal tibia has a straight sharp apophysis that has a wide base and a slight curve to its end.

The female is similar in size to the male, with a carapace typically 1.8 mm (0.07 in) long and 1.5 mm (0.06 in) wide and an abdomen typically 2.1 mm (0.08 in) long and 1.7 mm (0.07 in) wide. It is also similar in shape but is generally darker. Its abdomen is brown and has a different pattern to the male, consisting of two broad white stripes across the middle and three white patches near the spinnerets. As is typical for the genus, the epigyne has a pocket in the middle. The internal structure of the copulatory organs are, however, distinctive. The copulatory openings open to complex insemination ducts, with very visible accessory glands, that lead to multi-chambered spermathecae, or receptacles.

== Distribution and habitat ==
Pellenes cingulatus is endemic to Tanzania. The holotype was found during 1996 living in Mkomazi National Park amongst bushland dominated by Commiphora trees. Other specimens have been collected in the local area.
