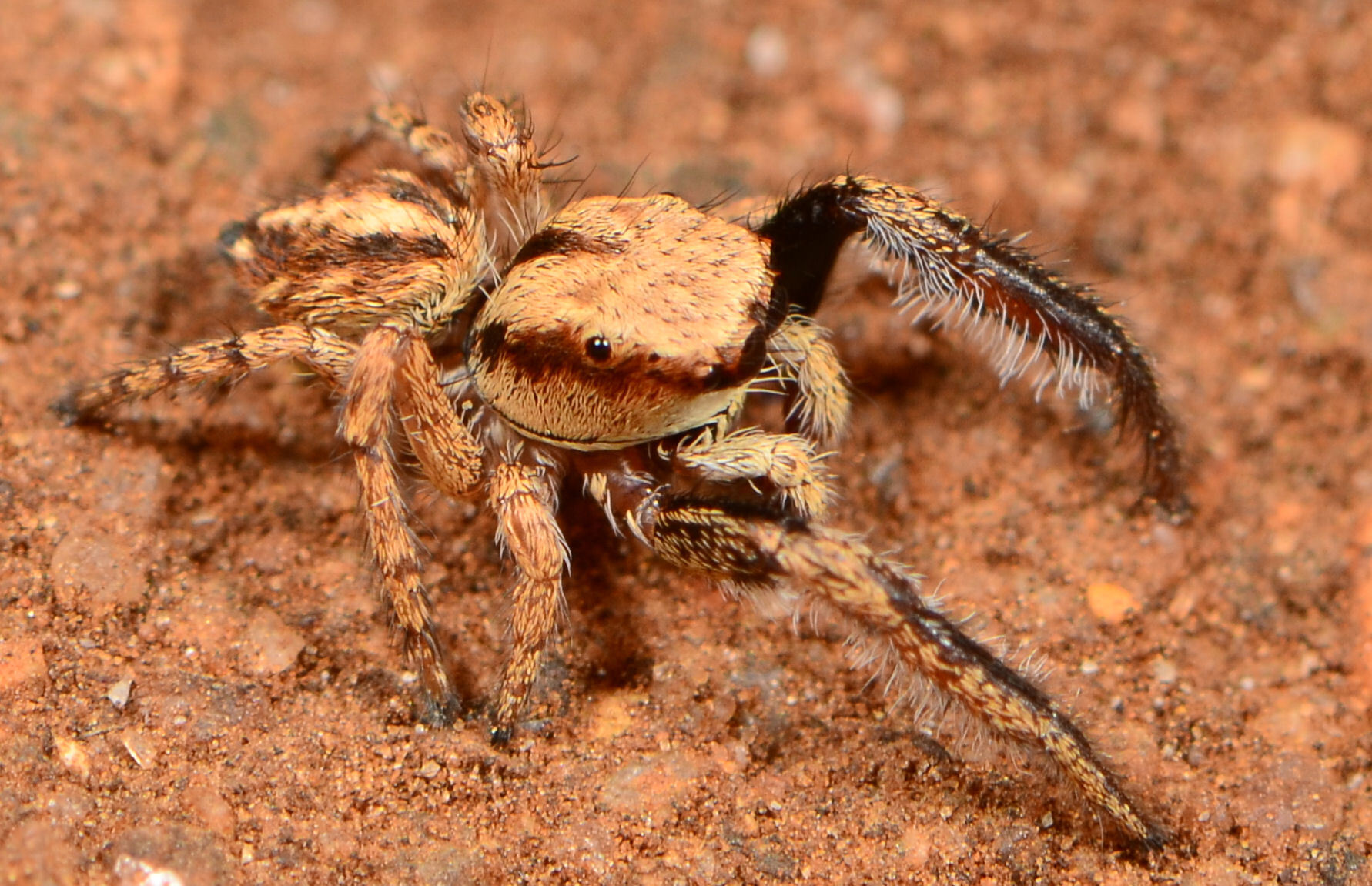
- P. modicus

Scientific classification
- Kingdom: Animalia
- Phylum: Arthropoda
- Subphylum: Chelicerata
- Class: Arachnida
- Order: Araneae
- Infraorder: Araneomorphae
- Family: Salticidae
- Subfamily: Salticinae
- Genus: Pellenes; Simon, 1876

Type species
- P. tripunctatus (Walckenaer, 1802)

Species
- 66, see text

Synonyms
- Hyllothyene Caporiacco, 1939

= Pellenes =

Genus of spiders

Pellenes is a genus of jumping spiders that was first circumscribed by Eugène Louis Simon in 1876. It is considered a senior synonym of Hyllothyene. In 2000, Dmitri Logunov, Yuri Marusik and Sergei Rakov divided the genus Pellenes into four subgenera, based on the shape of the male palpal bulb. The subgenera are Pelmirus, Pelmultus, and Pelpaucus. Wayne Maddison placed the genus in the subtribe Harmochirina in the tribe Plexippini in 2015. This had previously been known as Harmochireae, as circumscribed by Simon in 1903. It is allocated to the subclade Saltafresia in the clade Salticoida. The spiders are a member of Plexippoida. Phylogenetic analysis of molecular data demonstrates that the genus is most closely related to Habronattus and Havaika. In 2016, Jerzy Prószyński grouped the genus with Dexippus under the name Pelenines, named after the genus. It is allocated to the supergroup Hylloida.

They are dark to black with white stripes on the back, and often have bright red markings. Most species have a special propensity for snail shells. Pellenes seriatus and P. lapponicus males look very similar to Hasarius adansoni when viewed from the front.

== Distribution ==
Pellenes are found in North America, Africa, Europe, Asia, Australia, and Saint Helena:

== Species ==
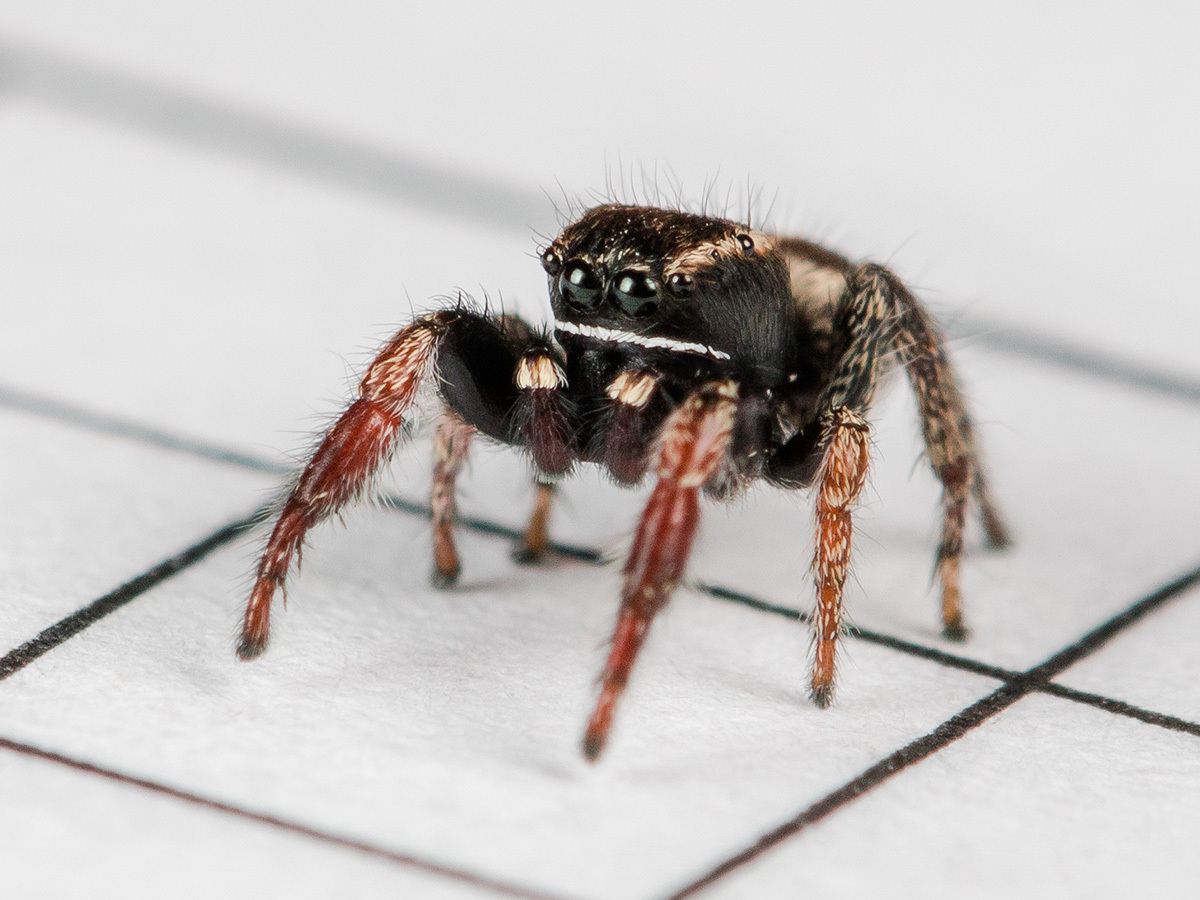
P. epularis

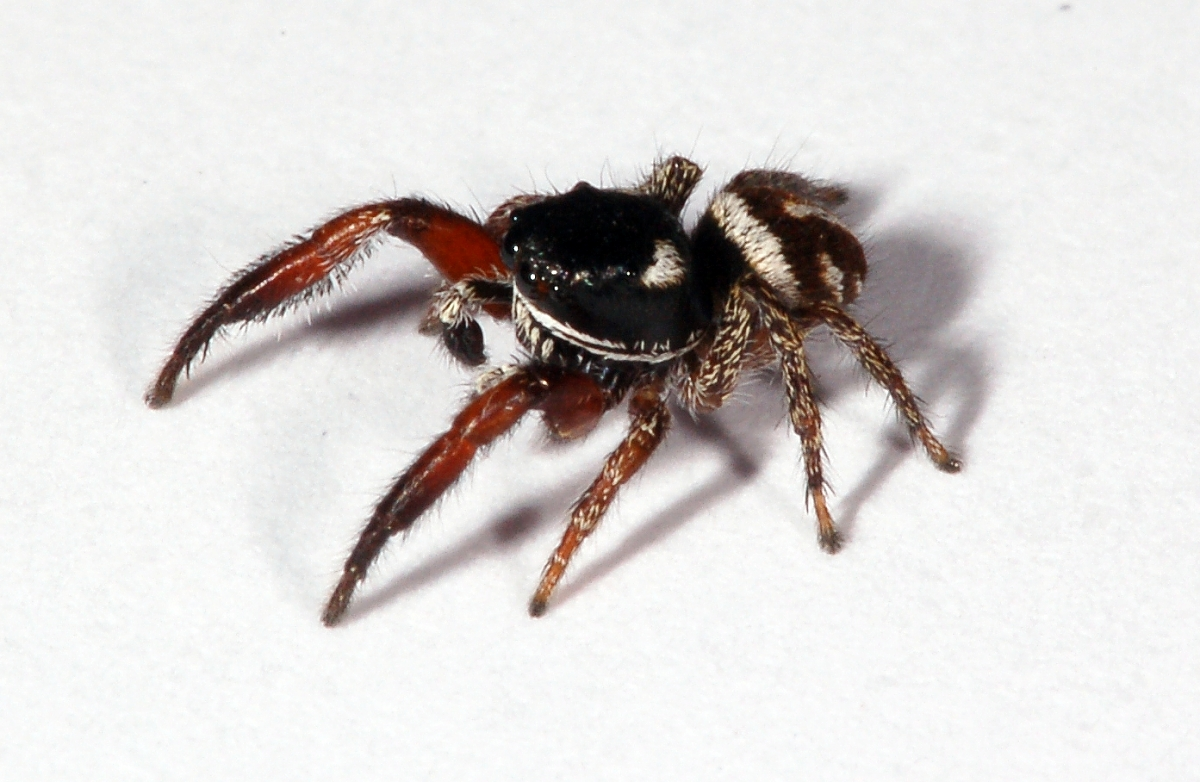
P. nigrociliatus

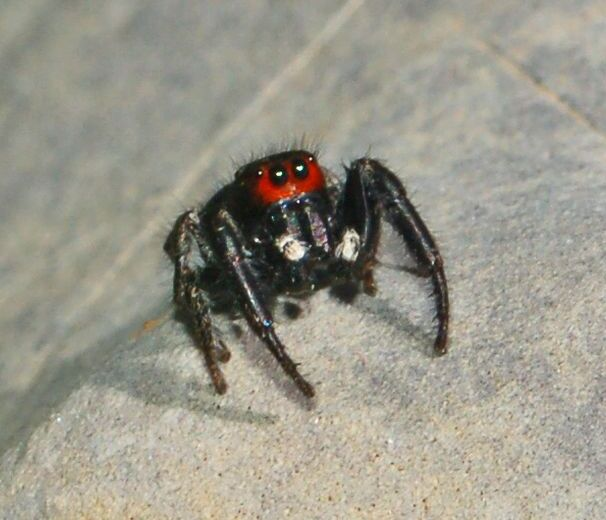
P. seriatus

As of October 2025, this genus includes 66 species and one subspecies:

- Pellenes albopilosus (Tystshenko, 1965) – Russia (Europe, West Siberia), Kazakhstan
- Pellenes allegrii Caporiacco, 1935 – Bulgaria, Ukraine, Russia (Europe), Kazakhstan, Central Asia, India
- Pellenes amazonka Logunov, Marusik & Rakov, 1999 – Kazakhstan, Central Asia
- Pellenes arciger (Walckenaer, 1837) – Canary Islands, Southern Europe, Algeria, Armenia
- Pellenes badkhyzicus Logunov, Marusik & Rakov, 1999 – Turkmenistan
- Pellenes beani G. W. Peckham & E. G. Peckham, 1903 – South Africa
- Pellenes bitaeniata (Keyserling, 1882) – Australia (Western Australia, Queensland, New South Wales)
- Pellenes bonus Logunov, Marusik & Rakov, 1999 – Ukraine (Crimea), Turkey, Azerbaijan, Iran, Turkmenistan
- Pellenes borisi Logunov, Marusik & Rakov, 1999 – Kazakhstan
- Pellenes brevis (Simon, 1868) – Portugal, Spain, France, Italy, Germany, Bulgaria, North Macedonia, Greece, Turkey, Cyprus, Ukraine, Armenia, Iran
- Pellenes canosus Simon, 1937 – France
- Pellenes cingulatus Wesołowska & Russell-Smith, 2000 – Tanzania
- Pellenes dahli Lessert, 1915 – Uganda, Kenya
- Pellenes denisi Schenkel, 1963 – Tajikistan, China
- Pellenes diagonalis (Simon, 1868) – North Macedonia, Bulgaria, Greece, Turkey, Caucasus, Israel, Iran
- Pellenes dilutus Logunov, 1995 – Kazakhstan, Turkmenistan
- Pellenes durioei (Lucas, 1846) – Algeria
- Pellenes epularis (O. Pickard-Cambridge, 1872) – Greece to China, Namibia, South Africa
- Pellenes flavipalpis (Lucas, 1853) – Greece (incl. Crete), Turkey, Cyprus, Lebanon, Israel
- Pellenes florii Schäfer, 2020 – Greece (Crete)
- Pellenes geniculatus (Simon, 1868) – Southern Europe, Morocco, Tanzania, Namibia, South Africa, Lesotho, Turkey, Ukraine, Caucasus, Middle East, Iran, Kazakhstan, Central Asia
  - P. g. subsultans (Simon, 1868) – France
- Pellenes gobiensis Schenkel, 1936 – Russia (South Siberia to Far North-East), Mongolia, China
- Pellenes hadaensis Prószyński, 1993 – Saudi Arabia
- Pellenes hedjazensis Prószyński, 1993 – Saudi Arabia, United Arab Emirates
- Pellenes himalaya Caleb, Sajan & Kumar, 2018 – India
- Pellenes iforhasorum Berland & Millot, 1941 – Sudan, Mali
- Pellenes ignifrons (Grube, 1861) – United States, Canada, Russia (Urals to Far East), Kazakhstan, China, Mongolia
- Pellenes ignotus Logunov, 2023 – Iran
- Pellenes inexcultus (O. Pickard-Cambridge, 1873) – St. Helena
- Pellenes iva Caleb, 2018 – India
- Pellenes karakumensis Logunov, Marusik & Rakov, 1999 – Turkmenistan
- Pellenes laevigatus (Simon, 1868) – Greece (Corfu), Lebanon
- Pellenes lagrecai Cantarella & Alicata, 2002 – Italy
- Pellenes lapponicus (Sundevall, 1833) – North America, Alps (France, Switzerland, Austria, Italy), Northern Europe, Russia (Europe, South Siberia)
- Pellenes levaillanti (Lucas, 1846) – Algeria
- Pellenes limbatus Kulczyński, 1895 – Russia (Middle to north-eastern Siberia), Kazakhstan, Mongolia, China
- Pellenes logunovi Marusik, Hippa & Koponen, 1996 – Russia (South Siberia)
- Pellenes lucidus Logunov & Zamanpoore, 2005 – Afghanistan
- Pellenes luculentus Wesołowska & van Harten, 2007 – Yemen
- Pellenes maderianus Kulczyński, 1905 – Madeira, Morocco
- Pellenes marionis (Schmidt & Krause, 1994) – Cape Verde
- Pellenes minimus (Caporiacco, 1933) – Libya
- Pellenes modicus Wesołowska & Russell-Smith, 2000 – Uganda, Tanzania, South Africa
- Pellenes moreanus Metzner, 1999 – North Macedonia, Greece, Turkey
- Pellenes negevensis Prószyński, 2000 – Israel
- Pellenes nigrociliatus (Simon, 1875) – Canary Islands, Europe, Algeria, Turkey, Israel, Caucasus, Central Asia, China
- Pellenes obliquostriatus Caporiacco, 1940 – Ethiopia
- Pellenes obvolutus Dawidowicz & Wesołowska, 2016 – Kenya
- Pellenes pamiricus Logunov, Marusik & Rakov, 1999 – Tajikistan
- Pellenes perexcultus Clark & Benoit, 1977 – St. Helena
- Pellenes pseudobrevis Logunov, Marusik & Rakov, 1999 – Russia (Europe, West Siberia), Kazakhstan, Central Asia
- Pellenes pulcher Logunov, 1995 – Russia (Europe to South Siberia), Kazakhstan, Mongolia
- Pellenes purcelli Lessert, 1915 – Uganda
- Pellenes rufoclypeatus G. W. Peckham & E. G. Peckham, 1903 – South Africa
- Pellenes seriatus (Thorell, 1875) – France, Kosovo, North Macedonia, Bulgaria, Greece, Romania, Ukraine, Turkey, Caucasus, Russia (Europe to Middle Siberia), Kazakhstan, Iran, Central Asia
- Pellenes sibiricus Logunov & Marusik, 1994 – Russia (Europe, Caucasus to Far East), Kazakhstan, Central Asia, Mongolia, China
- Pellenes siculus Alicata & Cantarella, 2000 – Italy (Sicily)
- Pellenes striolatus Wesołowska & van Harten, 2002 – Yemen (Socotra)
- Pellenes sytchevskayae Logunov, Marusik & Rakov, 1999 – Turkmenistan, Uzbekistan
- Pellenes tharinae Wesołowska, 2006 – Namibia, Zimbabwe, South Africa
- Pellenes tocharistanus Andreeva, 1976 – Central Asia
- Pellenes tripunctatus (Walckenaer, 1802) – Europe, Caucasus, Central Asia, China (type species)
- Pellenes turkmenicus Logunov, Marusik & Rakov, 1999 – Russia (Europe, Caucasus), Central Asia
- Pellenes unipunctus Saito, 1937 – China
- Pellenes univittatus (Caporiacco, 1939) – Ethiopia
- Pellenes vanharteni Wesołowska, 1998 – Cape Verde
