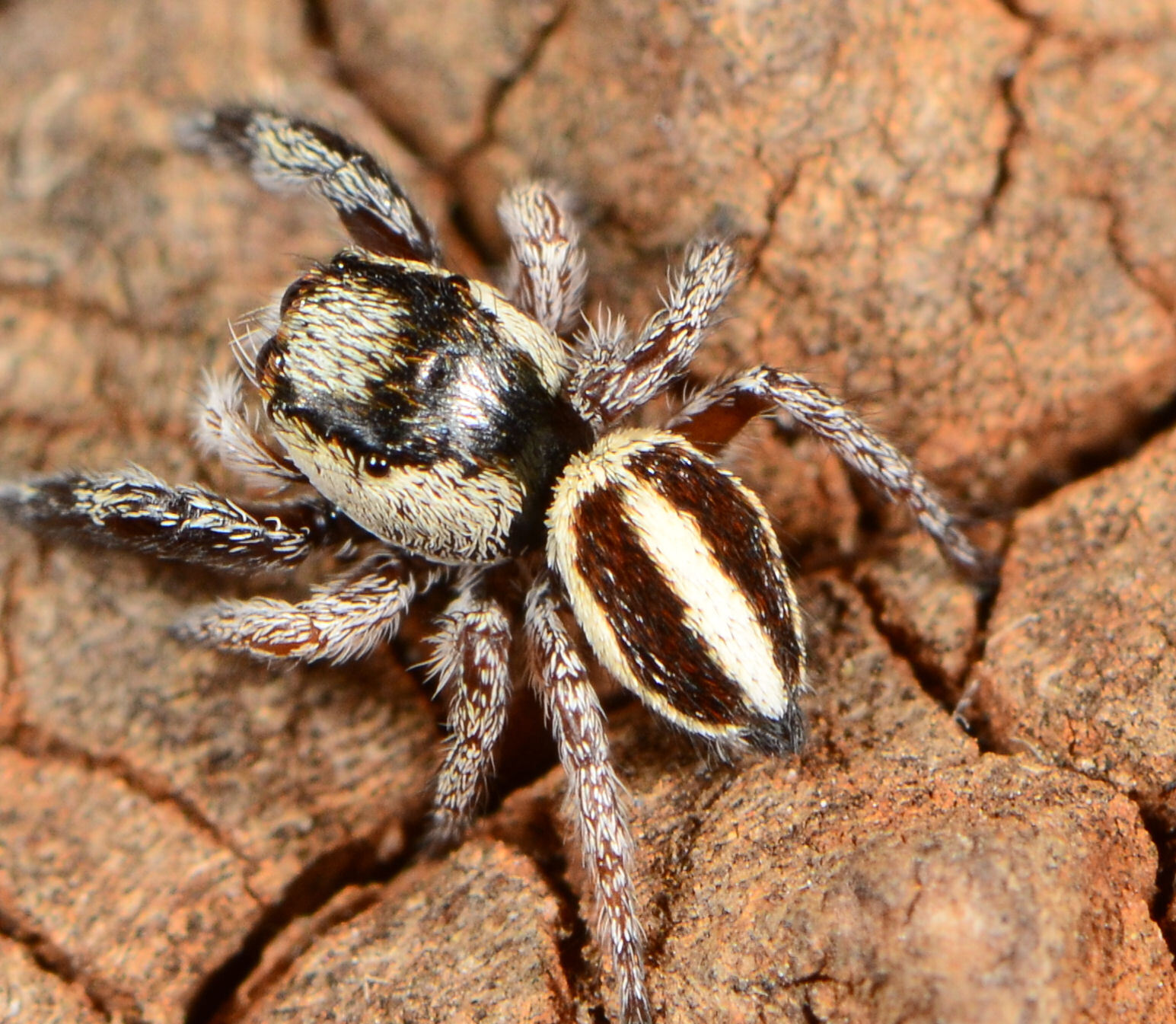
- female
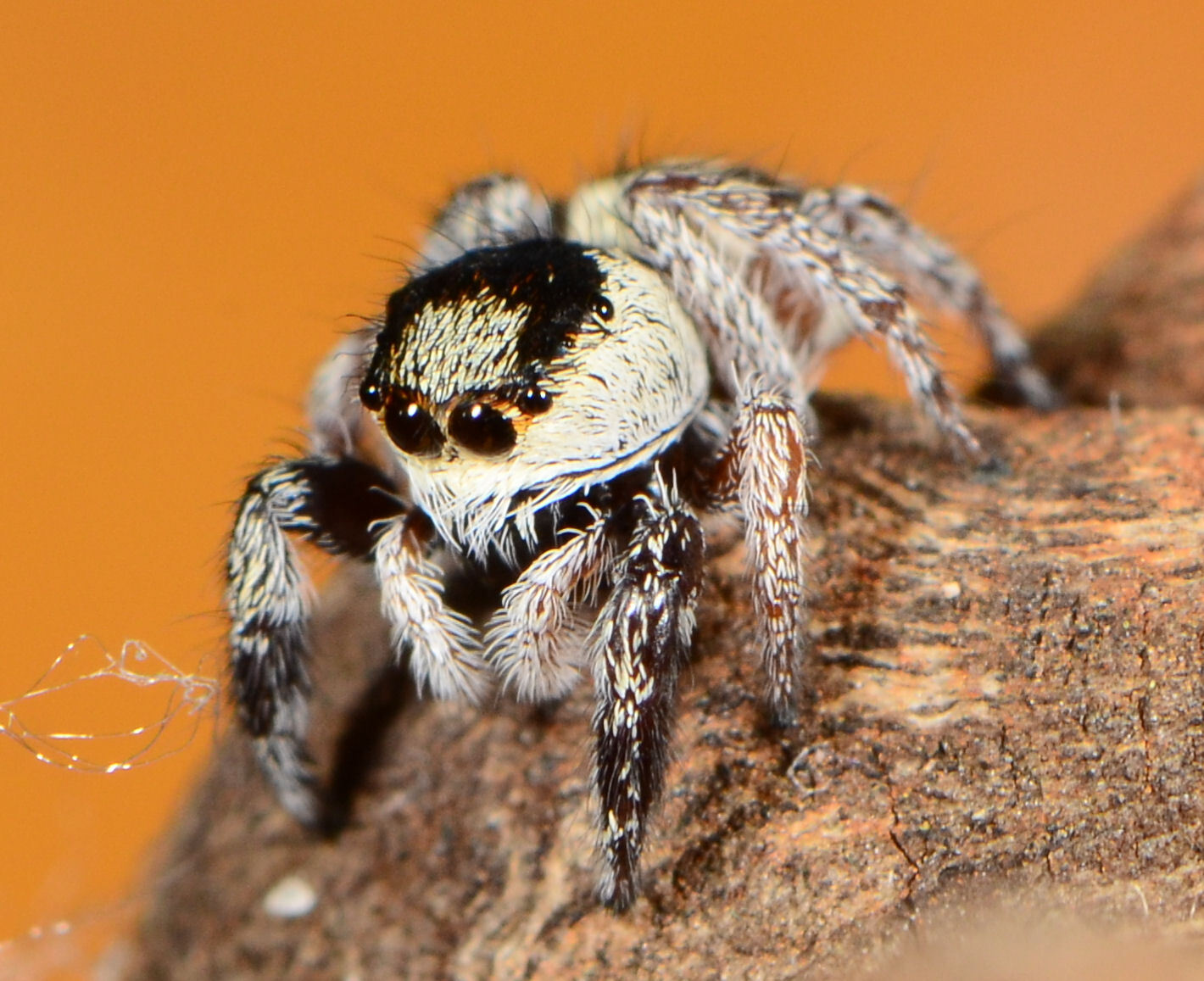
- female

Scientific classification
- Kingdom: Animalia
- Phylum: Arthropoda
- Subphylum: Chelicerata
- Class: Arachnida
- Order: Araneae
- Infraorder: Araneomorphae
- Family: Salticidae
- Genus: Pellenes
- Species: P. geniculatus

Binomial name
- Pellenes geniculatus (Simon, 1868)

Synonyms
- Attus geniculatus Simon, 1868; Attus gemellus Simon, 1873; Pellenes gemellus (Simon, 1876); Pellenes kraepelinorum Bösenberg, 1895; Pellenes kulabicus Andreeva, 1976

= Pellenes geniculatus =

Species of arachnid

Pellenes geniculatus is a jumping spider species in the genus Pellenes. First named Attus geniculatus by Eugène Simon in 1868, it was given its current name by Simon in 1876. A small spider, between 3.35 and 5 mm (0.132 and 0.197 in) long, it has a large range that stretches across Southern Europe, Africa and Central Asia. There is some variation between those found in Africa and in Europe and Asia, the former generally being slightly smaller. The head has a distinctive pattern of lines formed of white scales.

== Taxonomy ==
Originally allocated to the genus Attus, the species was first identified by Eugène Simon in 1868. The original description was solely of the female, and the male was misidentified as a new species, Attus gemellus, when first described by Simon in 1873. The current name was given by Simon in 1876 when the two were recognised as the same species. In 1987, it was recognised that Pellenes kraepelinorum described the same species, and so this became a synonym, as did Pellenes kulabicus, which had first been described by Ekaterina Andreeva in 1976. Between 1999 and 2020, it was considered to be the same as Pellenes simoni, but this is now recognised as a synonym of Pellenes flavipalpis.

== Description ==
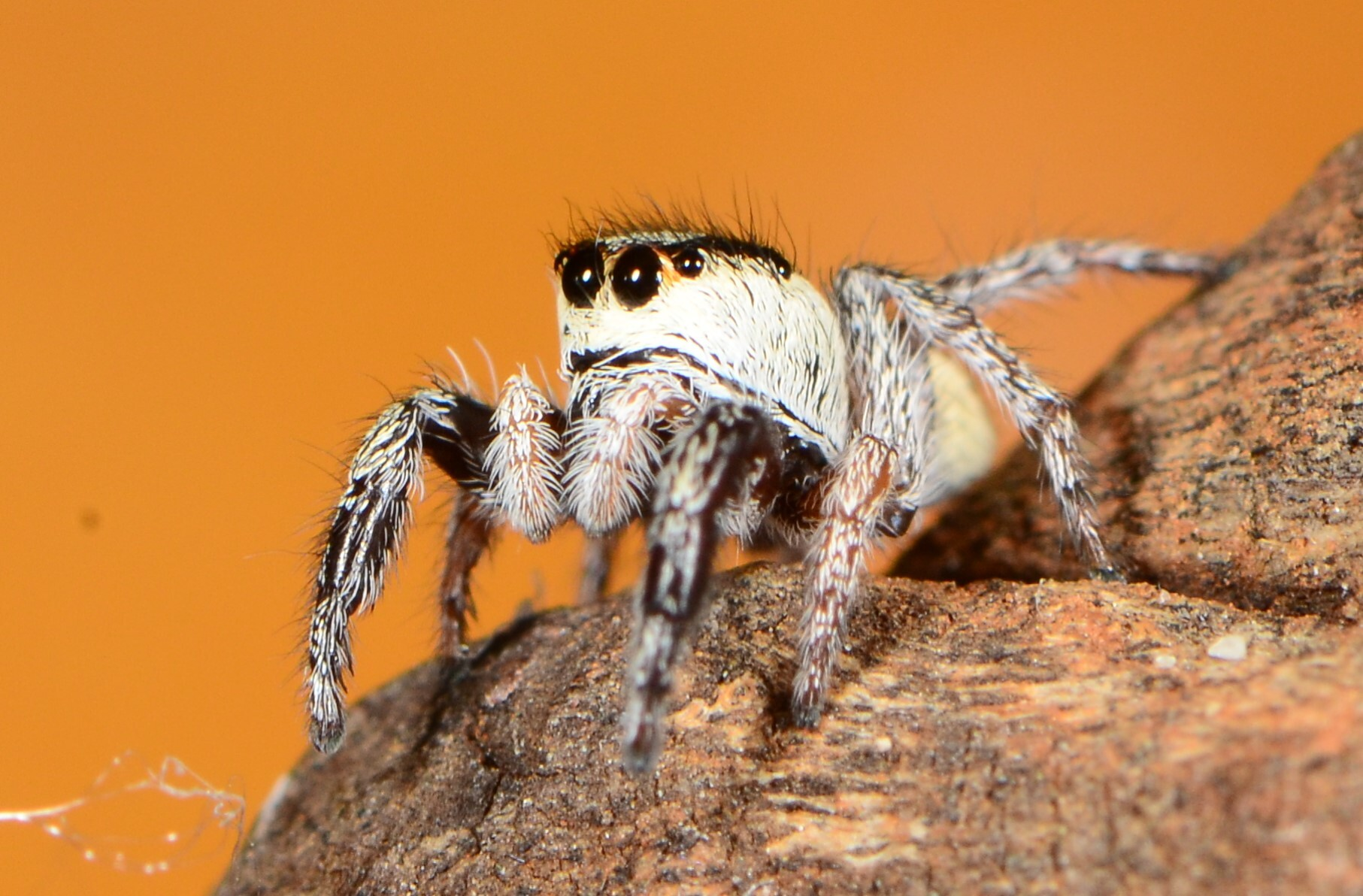
female

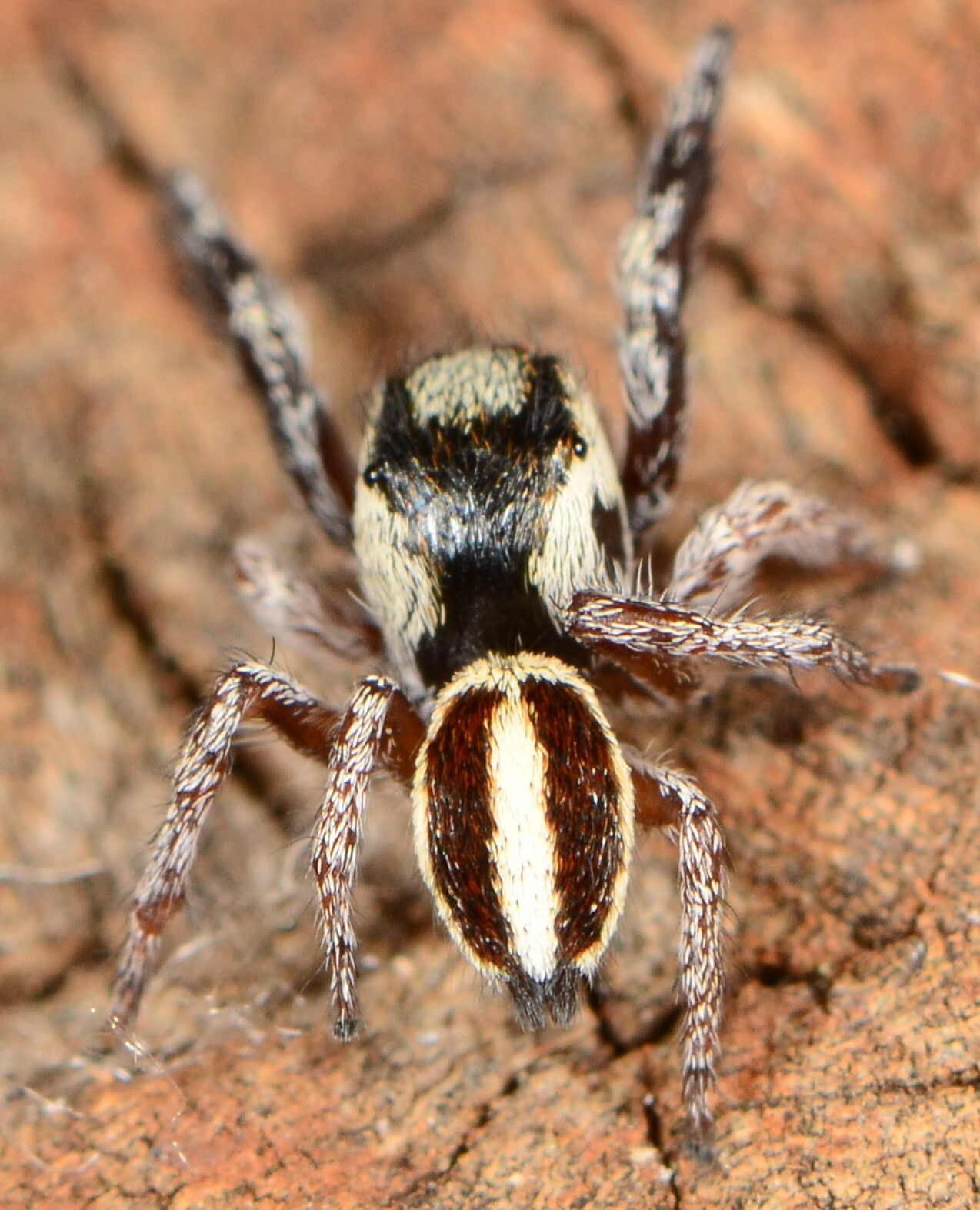
female

Pellenes geniculatus is a small spider, as is typical of the genus. The female is larger at between 4.2 and 5 mm (0.17 and 0.20 in) long, compared to the male that is between 3.35 and 3.7 mm (0.132 and 0.146 in) long. There is some variation between specimens, particularly between those in Africa and those found in Europe and Asia. The Asian spider typically has a carapace 1.75 mm (0.069 in) long. The male has an abdomen of a similar length that is brown with either a longitudinal white stripe or cross-link colour markings while the female has a larger abdomen, approximately 2.5 mm (0.098 in) long, which is brownish yellow. The African spider is smaller, with a carapace between 1.3 and 1.7 mm (0.051 and 0.067 in) long and an abdomen 1.4 to 1.6 mm (0.055 to 0.063 in). Although the abdomen is usually brown, some examples are lighter and orange-yellow with white stripes. The head has a distinctive pattern of lines formed of white scales.

== Distribution ==
The spider was first identified based on examples found in France, which is also the western extremity of its range. The species has been found in an area that stretches across Southern Europe, Africa and Central Asia. The furthest east that it has been identified is Mongolia and the furthest south is southern Africa.
