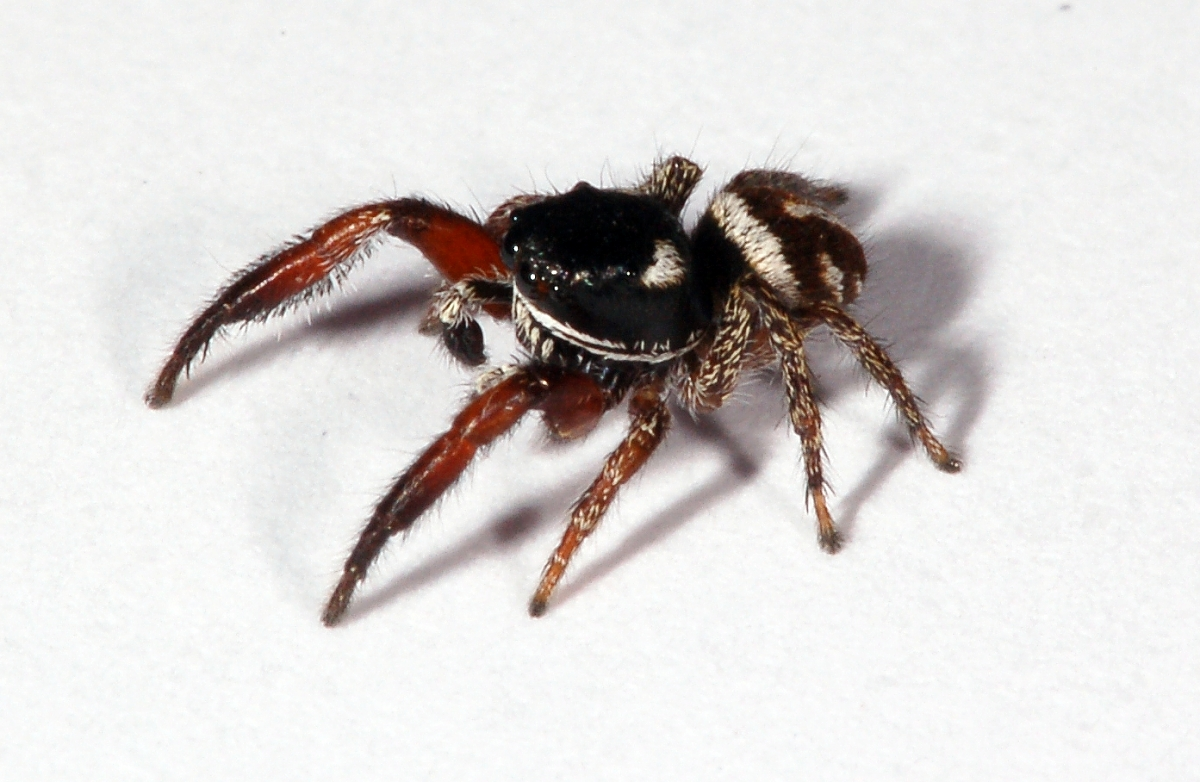
- Pellenes nigrociliatus from Hesse, Germany, in 2009

Scientific classification
- Kingdom: Animalia
- Phylum: Arthropoda
- Subphylum: Chelicerata
- Class: Arachnida
- Order: Araneae
- Infraorder: Araneomorphae
- Family: Salticidae
- Genus: Pellenes
- Species: P. nigrociliatus

Binomial name
- Pellenes nigrociliatus (Simon, 1875)

= Pellenes nigrociliatus =

Species of jumping spider

Pellenes nigrociliatus is a jumping spider species in the genus Pellenes. Originally described in 1875 with the name Attus nigrociliatus, it has been known by its current name since the year after. Measuring between 3.15 and 5.1 mm (0.124 and 0.201 in) in length, it is generally black and covered in white hairs. The part of its face known as its clypeus extends beyond its eyes and there is white or orange crescent-shaped spot also visible on its eye field. The top of its abdomen has a distinctive pattern of broad white stripes that cross in the middle. The female is larger and generally darker than the male. It has a wide range, being found across Europe and Asia from the Canary Islands to China. It lives in a wide range of dry habitats, including sandy slopes in chalky and rocky steppes, grasslands, sand dunes, and meadows of Miscanthus grasses. It nests in snail shells, such as those of Xerolenta obvia, that the female spider suspends from trees using braided silk threads. It constructs a door for the shells made from silk.

== Taxonomy ==
Pellenes nigrociliatus is a species of jumping spider, a member of the family Salticidae, that was first described by the French naturalist Eugène Simon in 1875 and published in a paper by Carl Ludwig Koch. Originally assigned to the genus Attus, it was given its current name in 1876 when Simon moved it to a new genus Pellenes, circumscribed at the same time. The species gave its name to one of the principal subgroups of species in the genus. In 2000, the arachnologists Dmitri Logunov and Yuri Marusik divided the genus Pellenes into four subgenera based on the shape of the male palpal bulb. Pellenes nigrociliatus is a member of the subgenus Pelmultus.

In 2015, the Canadian biologist Wayne Maddison placed the genus Pellenes in the subtribe Harmochirina in the tribe Plexippini. This had previously been known as Harmochireae, as circumscribed by Simon in 1903. It is allocated to the subclade Saltafresia in the clade Salticoida. It is a member of Plexippoida. In 2016, the Polish arachnologist Jerzy Prószyński grouped the genus with Dexippus under a group of genera with the name Pelenines, named after the genus. It is classified in the supergroup Hylloida. Phylogenetic analyses of molecular data demonstrates that the genus is most closely related to Habronattus and Havaika.

In 2000, Logunov and Marusik stated that a female of the species had been wrongly described as Sitticus dzieduszyckii in 1998. They corrected this the following year and, along with other specimen from the South Urals, the spider was recognised as the other species. Other spiders that were originally considered to be Pellenes nigrociliatus have been moved to Pellenes allegrii and Pellenes laris.

=== Synonyms ===
In 1999, the species Pellenes tauricus, describered by Tamerlan Thorell in 1875, was moved from being a synonym with Pellenes simoni to be a junior synonym with Pellenes nigrociliatus. According to the World Spider Catalog, the species has been described by the following species names:

- Attus bedeli Simon, 1875
- Attus nigrociliatus Simon, 1875
- Attus tauricus Thorell, 1875
- Calliethera unispina Franganillo, 1910
- Pellenes bedeli Simon, 1876
- Pellenes bilunulatus Simon, 1877
- Pellenes brassayi Herman, 1879
- Pellenes nigrociliatus bilunulatus Simon, 1937

== Description ==
=== Male spider ===
The spider is generally black with broad white stripes across its abdomen. The male is between 3.15 and 3.85 mm (0.12 and 0.15 in) long. It has a front section, or cephalothorax, that typically measures between 1.7 and 2 mm (0.067 and 0.079 in) long and between 1.25 and 1.5 mm (0.05 and 0.06 in) wide. Its carapace, the hard upper part of the cephalothorax, is generally black, with some spiders being dark brown with a black border. It is covered in white hair. There is a fine band of white scale-like hairs at the back of its eye plate and a white or orange crescent-shaped spot behind some of its eyes. There are also bands of white scale-like hairs on the upper part of its jaws, or chelicerae, and white hairs on the part of the underside of the cephalothorax known as its sternum, which is otherwise plain dark brown or black, again with white hairs. There are also fine, white, scale-like hairs on the lower part of the spider's face, known as its clypeus, which has a distinctive shape and projects beyond its eyes. Its mouthparts, including its labium and maxillae, are dark brown or black.

The male has an abdomen that typically ranges between 1.45 and 1.85 mm (0.06 and 0.07 in) in length and 1.2 and 1.35 mm (0.05 and 0.05 in) in width. It is generally velvety black with a white stripe that runs down the middle of its upperside, another that crosses halfway, and two more along its sides. Underneath, there is a pattern of light-brown markings and two rows of beige dots running down the middle. In some specimens, the underside is plain light yellow. The spider's book lung covers are yellow-brown and its spinnerets are brown. Its legs are yellowish-brown or orange-brown with brown stripes running down them. They have white scale-like hairs and short black spines. Its pedipalps, sensory organs near its mouth, are pale yellow or dark brown.

The spider's reproductive system is similar to those of others in the genus. The male's pedipalps end with a tibia that has a large spike, or tibial apophysis, that projects upwards and alongside its cymbium. Its cymbium is a relatively large, squared, hairy oval and has a cluster of small hairs at the top. Attached to the cymbium is a smaller tegulum, a round domed palpal bulb that terminates in a short narrow spike-like embolus. This is accompanied by a smaller projection that makes it look as if the spider has a double embolus. The spider is particularly similar to Pellenes tocharistanus but can be distinguished by the pattern on its carapace, the size of its palpal bulb.

Some of the spiders found in Algeria may be another species, as the part of the male's tegulum near the embolus has a different shape, and the ridge on the cymbium is less clearly marked. A team of arachnologists led by Wahiba Berretima suggested, in 2025, that this may be an example of a more primitive type of the species rather than a new species altogether.

=== Female spider ===
The female is larger than the male at between 4.65 and 5.1 mm (0.183 and 0.201 in) long. It has a carapace typically between 1.85 and 2.3 mm (0.07 and 0.09 in) in length and 1.45 and 1.8 mm (0.06 and 0.07 in) in width and an abdomen typically 2.8 mm (0.11 in) long and between 1.9 and 2 mm (0.07 and 0.08 in) wide. Its carapace is similar to the male as tall as it is wide. It has white and orange markings on its eye field like the male. Its clypeus similarly extends beyond its eyes. The front row of eyes is tightly clustered, the central ones being noticeably large. The second row of eyes are smaller and the third row arranged far apart, to the edge of the cephalothorax. It has the same characteristic pattern on its abdomen but is otherwise darker. Its front legs are dark reddish-brown with yellowish-white scales.

Female Pellenes spiders are hard to distinguish from others in the genus but their copulatory organs have distinctive features that help differentiate it from other species. The epigyne of the Pellenes nigrociliatus, its external visible copulatory organ, is rounded with two central copulatory openings, each tightly lined on the front edge by a ridge. The shape of the ridge on the female's epigyne helps to distinguish it from the otherwise similar Pellenes tocharistanus. The openings lead via relatively short insemination ducts to multi-chambered spermathecae, or receptacles.

== Distribution ==
Pellenes spiders can be found across the Afrotropical, Holarctic and Indomalayan realms. Pellenes nigrociliatus has been found in an area that pans from the Canary Islands, through Turkey and Israel, across the Caucasus and Russia, to Central Asia and as far as China. It is common across Central Asia, including Azerbaijan, Turkmenistan, Kyrgyzstan, Tajikistan and Uzbekistan. The species is native to Europe, and has been identified in surveys across a wide range of countries including France, the Czech Republic, Poland, Romania and Ukraine. In China, the species in found in Xinjiang and Yunnan.

== Habitat and behaviour ==
Pellenes nigrociliatus lives in a wide range of environments but is thermophilic and therefore prefers sandy slopes in grasslands and sand dunes. It has also been found in chalky and rocky steppes and meadows of Miscanthus grasses. In central Asia, it is common in broadleaf forests. In Europe, the male is more commonly found in May, the female toward the end of June and July. The species nests and overwinters in snail shells, such as Xerolenta obvia. The females suspend the shells from trees with braided silk threads that are 1 and 3 cm (0.39 and 1.18 in) long. They also use a curtain made of thick layers of silk to cover the entrance. The shells are attached to grasses or, in the absence of plants, walls. The females prefer to attach their shells to areas that have larger amounts of vegetation than the males. The shells, which may weigh five or more times as much as the spider, are used to shelter from attacks by ants. The spider will also use snail shells to store eggs.
