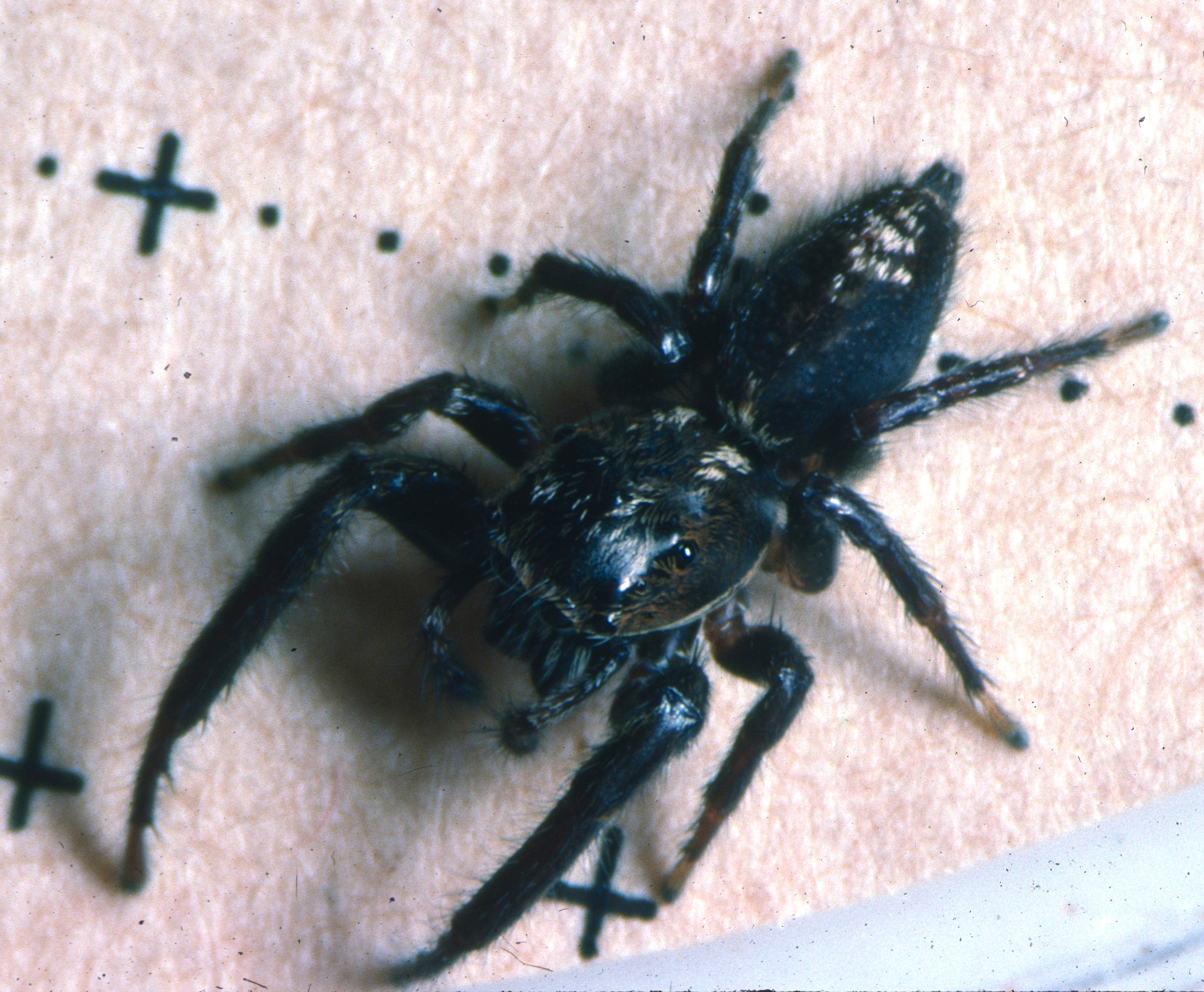
- Havaika sp. male in Hawaii

Scientific classification
- Kingdom: Animalia
- Phylum: Arthropoda
- Subphylum: Chelicerata
- Class: Arachnida
- Order: Araneae
- Infraorder: Araneomorphae
- Family: Salticidae
- Subfamily: Salticinae
- Genus: Havaika; Prószyński, 2002

Type species
- Havaika jamiesoni Prószyński, 2002

Species
- See text.

= Havaika =

Genus of spiders

Havaika is a genus of the spider family Salticidae (jumping spiders). The genera Habronattus and Pellenes are closely related. All then known species were split from the genus Sandalodes.

All twelve species occur on the islands of the Hawaiian and Marquesas chains. Recent molecular studies suggest that the species from the two chains are the result of independent colonizations (Arnedo & Gillespie, 2006). The Marquesas species H. triangulifera and H. flavipes are not included in Havaika by Prószyński, 2008.

Collecting travels in the late 1990 have suggested that the salticid fauna of Hawaii has been drastically exterminated, so it may be that several or most of the described species are in fact already extinct.

== Description ==
Spiders in this genus follow the generalized salticid body plan, but differ from other genera by the appearance of the epigyne. The cephalothorax is dark with variable whitish setae ornamentation on the face and some white and yellow scales on the frontal surface of chelicerae and the rim of the eyes. The body length varies from less than two up to ten mm.

== Relationship with other genera ==
Although placed in subfamily Pelleninae, tribus Pellenini at a time, Prószyński, 2008 abstains from formal subfamilial placement of the genus. The Havaika epigynes resemble those of the genera Bianor, Modunda and Habronattus, but differ from them by the structure of spermathecae and other internal structures. Male palps of Havaika seem to be more specialized.

== Evolution on Hawaii ==
The ancestors of modern Havaika species probably reached the Hawaiian islands after most of the recent islands were already formed (about two million years ago), and after many other spiders had already colonized the islands. The speciation does not follow the progression rule typically found in radiated species of Hawaii, where islands were colonized as they formed, creating new species on the way. Today, Havaika represents about four thirds of all salticid species on Hawaii.

Four lineages can be discerned, using genetic analysis (Arnedo & Gillespie, 2006). Prószyński, 2008 regards the biogeography of lineages by Arnedo & Gillespie, 2006 as meaningless.

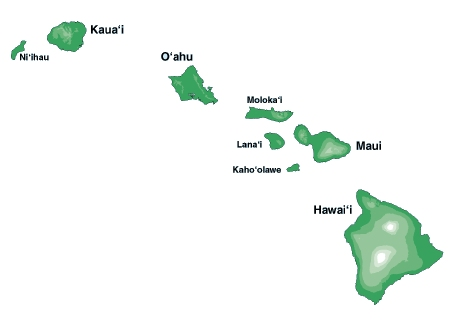

- Specimens from the pubens clade bear yellowish scales on the chelicerae in both sexes, and long palpal tibia in males. Their carapace is dark brown, with two lighter longitudinal dorsal bands. They occur on Maui, Moloka'i and Lana'i (which were once a single island), Kauaʻi, O'ahu and Big Island.
- The verecunda clade shows sexual dimorphism: males bear rows of long white bristles on the chelicerae and have short palpal tibia, while females have few bristles, but dense white hairs on the clypeus. The black carapace sometimes sports a brush of white hairs on the mid-frontal part, with two longitudinal whitish spots. They occur on Moloka'i and Maui, which were a single island until about half a million years ago, Kauaʻi and O'ahu.
- "Morphotype D" is almost uniformly dark brown with grayish longitudinal abdominal patterns. It shows sparse white scales restricted to the lower margin of the clypeus. It is found on Lana'i.
- H. cruciata shows the same facial characteristics as the verecunda clade, but can be distinguished by bulb characters. Males have a slender, long embolus originating from the basal half of the tegulum, similar to the embolus of the pubens clade, but a short palpal tibia. They have the same black carapace as the verecunda clade. H. cruciata is only found on Big Island. It is probably the sister taxon of Morphotype D.
- Specimens from Necker Island and Nīhoa (northwest of Kauaʻi) did not fit into the four defined morphotypes.

However, it is currently not feasible to group the poorly defined species into these lineages.

In all cases where two species were found on the same island, they significantly differed in size. This makes it likely that the two species hunt for different prey, and thus do not compete with each other. However, it seems that Havaika size differentiation happened soon after arrival on the Hawaiian islands, with subsequent dispersal and further speciation. This is suggested by the observation that the bigger of two sympatric species always belongs to one evolutionary lineage (pubens clade), while the smaller belongs to the other (Arnedo & Gillespie, 2006).

== Species ==
=== Marquesas group ===
- Havaika flavipes (Berland, 1933)
- Havaika nigrolineata (Berland, 1933)
- Havaika triangulifera (Berland, 1933)

=== Hawaii group ===
- Havaika albociliata (Simon, 1900) – Lanai Island: Mt. Koele
- Havaika canosa (Simon, 1900) – Maui Island
- Havaika cruciata (Simon, 1900) – probably Hawai'i Island, but there is also a Kana on Maui Island
- Havaika jamiesoni Prószyński, 2002 – Kauai Island
- Havaika pubens (Simon, 1900) – presumably Hawai'i Island: "Kanu", "Kenu" or "Kau"
- Havaika navata (Simon, 1900) – Lanai Island
- Havaika senicula (Simon, 1900) – Maui Island
- Havaika valida (Simon, 1900) – presumably Oahu Island
- Havaika verecunda (Simon, 1900) – Oahu Island

The following 14 species from Hawaii were newly described in 2008, with five further unidentified species:

- Havaika arnedoi Prószynski, 2008 – Hawai'i Island
- Havaika beattyi Prószynski, 2008 – Molokai Island
- Havaika berlandi Prószynski, 2008 – Hawai'i Island
- Havaika berryorum Prószynski, 2008 – Hawai'i Island
- Havaika ciliata Prószynski, 2008 – Hawai'i Island
- Havaika gillespieae Prószynski, 2008 – Oahu Island
- Havaika gressitti Prószynski, 2008 – Oahu Island
- Havaika kahiliensis Prószynski, 2008 – Kauai Island
- Havaika kauaiensis Prószynski, 2008 – Kauai Island
- Havaika kraussi Prószynski, 2008 – Maui Island
- Havaika mananensis Prószynski, 2008 – Oahu Island
- Havaika mauiensis Prószynski, 2008 – Maui Island: Hana Forest Reserve
- Havaika oceanica Prószynski, 2008 – Necker Island
- Havaika tantalensis Prószynski, 2008 – Oahu Island
