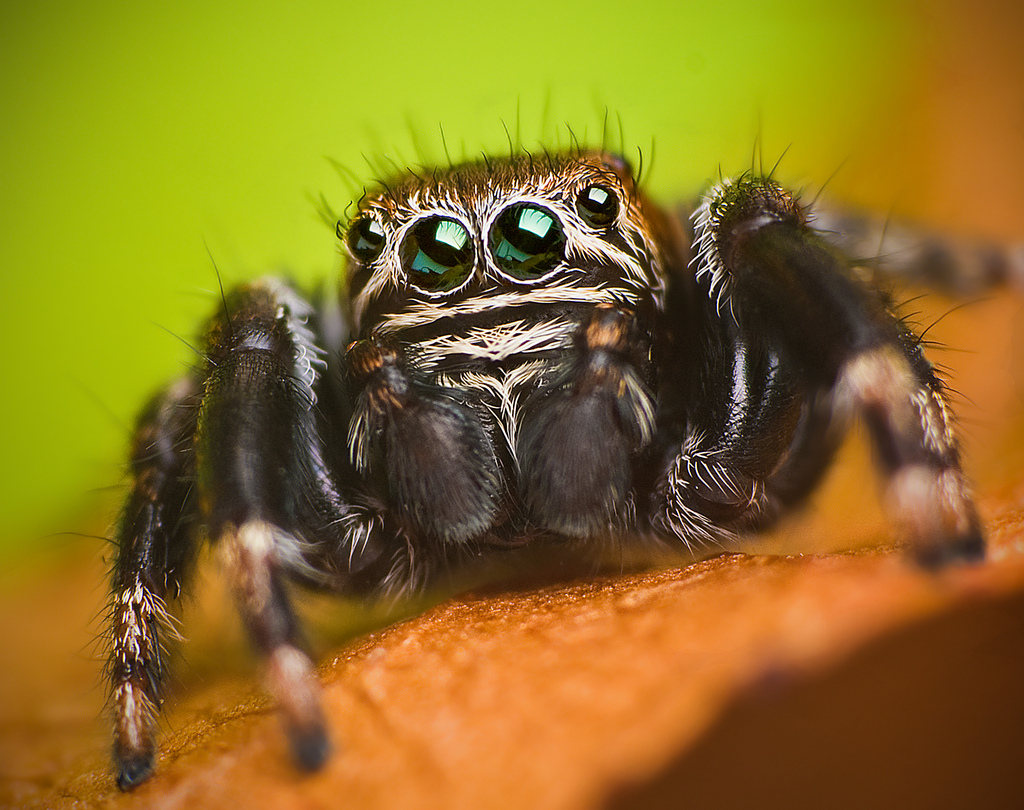
- Male Evarcha arcuata

Scientific classification
- Kingdom: Animalia
- Phylum: Arthropoda
- Subphylum: Chelicerata
- Class: Arachnida
- Order: Araneae
- Infraorder: Araneomorphae
- Family: Salticidae
- Subfamily: Salticinae
- Tribe: Plexippini; Simon, 1901

= Plexippini =

Tribe of Salticidae spiders

The Plexippini are a tribe of jumping spiders (Salticidae). They have also been treated as the subfamily Plexippinae.

== Genera ==
Wayne Maddison in 2015 placed the following genera in the tribe:

- Afrobeata Caporiacco, 1941
- Anarrhotus Simon, 1902
- Artabrus Simon, 1902
- Baryphas Simon, 1902
- Bianor Peckham & Peckham, 1886
- Brancus Simon, 1902
- Burmattus Prószyński, 1992
- Dasycyptus Simon, 1902
- Dexippus Thorell, 1891
- Eburneana Wesołowska & Szűts, 2001
- Encymachus Simon, 1902
- Epeus Peckham & Peckham, 1886
- Evarcha Simon, 1902
- Habronattus F.O. P.-Cambridge, 1901
- Harmochirus Simon, 1885
- Hermotimus Simon, 1903
- Hyllus C.L. Koch, 1846
- Iranattus Prószyński, 1992
- Microbianor Logunov, 2000
- Modunda Simon, 1901
- Monomotapa Wesołowska, 2000 – now included in Iranattus
- Napoca Simon, 1901
- Neaetha Simon, 1884
- Nigorella Wesołowska & Tomasiewicz, 2008
- Pachyonomastus Caporiacco, 1947
- Pancorius Simon, 1902
- Parajotus Peckham & Peckham, 1903
- Paraneaetha Denis, 1947
- Paraplexippus Franganillo, 1930
- Pellenes Simon, 1876
- Pellolessertia Strand, 1929
- Pharacocerus Simon, 1902
- Plexippoides Prószyński, 1984
- Plexippus C.L. Koch, 1846
- Polemus Simon, 1902
- Pseudamycus Simon, 1885
- Pseudoplexippus Caporiacco, 1947
- Ptocasius Simon, 1885
- Schenkelia Lessert, 1927
- Sibianor Logunov, 2001
- Taivala Peckham & Peckham, 1907
- Telamonia Thorell, 1887
- Thyene Simon, 1885
- Vailimia Kammerer, 2006
- Yaginumaella Prószyński, 1979
- Erasinus Simon, 1899
