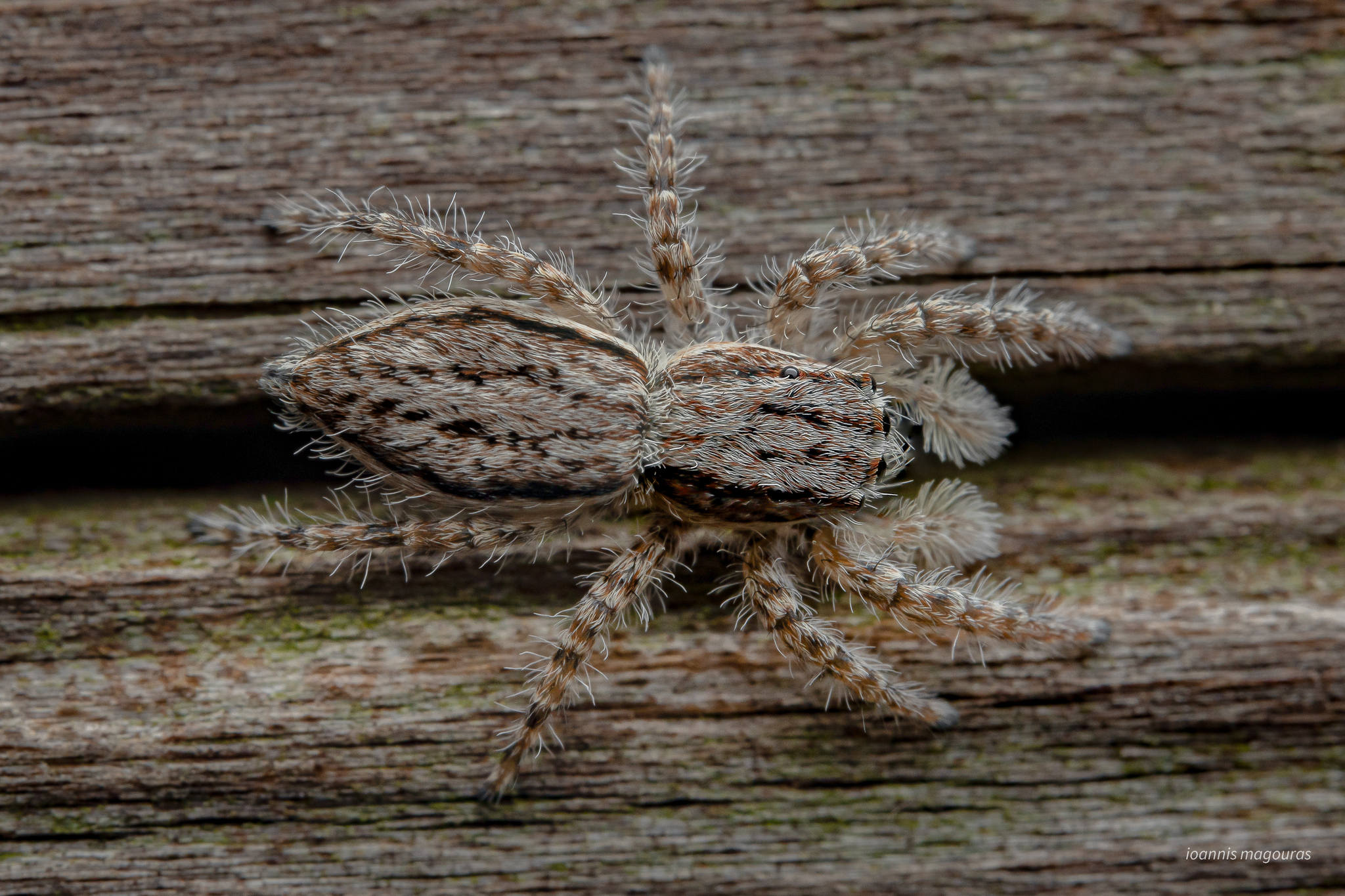

Scientific classification
- Kingdom: Animalia
- Phylum: Arthropoda
- Subphylum: Chelicerata
- Class: Arachnida
- Order: Araneae
- Infraorder: Araneomorphae
- Family: Salticidae
- Genus: Menemerus
- Species: M. zimbabwensis

Binomial name
- Menemerus zimbabwensis Wesołowska, 1999

= Menemerus zimbabwensis =

Species of spider

Menemerus zimbabwensis, the Zimbabwe Menemerus Jumping Spider, is a species of jumping spider that lives in South Africa and Zimbabwe. The Polish arachnologist Wanda Wesołowska first described the female in 1999 and the male in 2007. A member of the genus Menemerus, the spider is large, with a typical body length that is between 4 and 7.8 millimetres (0.16 and 0.31 in). The female is larger than the male. It also lacks the light stripe down the centre of its dark brown carapace, the upper part of its forward section, and has a less distinct pattern on its abdomen that lies behind it. Its legs and its sensory organs, its pedipalps, are yellow, while on the male they are brown. The male can be distinguished from the similar Menemerus nigli by the wide stripe on its abdomen. The female is harder to identify without looking at its copulatory organs. These are distinctive with characteristic large entrance bowls on its epigyne, the external visible part of its copulatory organs, which are larger than the insemination ducts and internal receptacles, or spermathecae, combined. Its internal organs are very sclerotized.

== Taxonomy ==
Menemerus zimbabwensis is a species of jumping spider that was first described by Wanda Wesołowska in 1999. Initially, she only described the female, her description of the male following in 2007. It was one of over 500 species identified by the Polish arachnologist during her career, making her one of the most prolific in the field. She allocated the spider to the genus Menemerus, which was first circumscribed in 1868 by Eugène Simon and contains over 60 species. The genus name derives from two Greek words, meaning certainly and diurnal. The genus shares some characteristics with the genera Anarrhotus, Clynotis, Freya, Hypaeus and Pellenes.

Genetic analysis has shown that the genus Menemerus is related to the genera Helvetia and Phintella. It was placed in the tribe Heliophaninae, although this tribe was renamed Chrysillini by Wayne Maddison in 2015. The tribe is ubiquitous across most continents of the world. The tribe is allocated to the subclade Saltafresia in the clade Salticoida. In 2016, Jerzy Prószyński created a group of genera named Menemerines after the genus. The vast majority of the species in Menemerines are members of the genus, with additional examples from Kima and Leptorchestes. The specific name derives from the country where it was first identified. It is commonly known as the Zimbabwe Menemerus Jumping Spider.

== Description ==
Menemerus zimbabwensis is a large spider covered in soft hairs. Its body consists of two main components, a cephalothorax and an abdomen. The male has a flattened oval cephalothorax that is between 2.5 and 3.0 mm (0.10 and 0.12 in) long and 1.9 and 2.4 mm (0.07 and 0.09 in) wide. The carapace is dark brown with a narrow streak formed of white hairs on the lateral edges. The eye field is darker and long brown bristles can be found near the eyes. A dense covering of white hairs can be found on the eye field and in the middle of the carapace. The spider has a very low face, or clypeus, that is also covered in white hairs. The mouthparts, consisting of the spider's chelicerae, labium and maxilae, are dark brown, as is the underside of the carapace, or sternum.

The male spider has an oval abdomen that is between 2.8 and 3.5 mm (0.11 and 0.14 in) long and 1.7 and 2.1 mm (0.07 and 0.08 in) wide. It has a large brown middle section, greyish-white sides and a dark underside. Its spinnerets, used for spinning webs, are brownish. The spider's legs are generally brown, but the foremost pair are darker. They are covered in grey and brown hairs, and have brown spines. Its pedipalps, sensory organs near its mouth, are also brown with white hairs. The spider has distinctive copulatory organs. There is a very long horizontal projection on the palpal tibia, or tibial apophysis. The palpal femur is also very long and bulbous, particularly at the bottom. Attached to the tibia is a palpal bulb, which is very elongated and has a bump near the bottom. Near the top, it has a curved embolus that is accompanied by a projection that runs next to it out of its tegulum called a tegular apophysis.

The female is larger than the male. It has a cephalothorax that is between 2.7 and 3.2 mm (0.11 and 0.13 in) in length and 2.1 and 2.5 mm (0.08 and 0.10 in) in width. The carapace is flat and dark brown with white lines along its sides. White hairs cover the whole of the topside and are especially dense in the middle. As in the male, the eyes have long brown bristles. The mouthparts are also similar to the male. Its elongated abdomen is between 3.6 and 4.6 mm (0.14 and 0.18 in) long and 2.2 and 2.8 mm (0.09 and 0.11 in) wide. The topside is dark brown apart from an indistinct lighter stripe down the middle and two white patches at the very rear. The underside is light with a wide greyish-beige stripe down the middle. Its spinnerets are dark and its legs are dark yellow with brown markings. Its pedipalps are yellow with white hairs.

The epigyne, the external visible part of the female's copulatory organ, is oval with a shallow central depression that is plugged with a waxy secretion in some examples. It has widely spaced pockets. The copulatory openings lead to short wide insemination ducts and spherical spermathecae, or receptacles. There are large bowl-like depressions near the entrances to the spider's insemination ducts, which are larger than the ducts and spermathecae combined. The internal organs are very sclerotized.

Spiders of the Menemerus genus are difficult to distinguish. The female can be identified by the large entrance bowls in its epigyne. The male is similar to Menemerus pilosus but differs in the shape of its tibial apophysis. It can be distinguished from the related Menemerus nigli by the wide stripe on its abdomen.

== Behaviour ==
Due to their good eyesight, Menemerus spiders are mostly diurnal hunters. Like other jumping spiders, they attack using a complex approach to their prey and are generally more proactive in comparison to web-spinning spiders. The spiders will eat a wide range of prey, including nectar. They undertake complex displays and dances during courtship. The males also undertake aggressive displays between themselves.

== Distribution and habitat ==
Menemerus spiders are found throughout Africa and Asia, and have been identified as far as Latin America. Menemerus zimbabwensis is found in South Africa and Zimbabwe. The female holotype was found in 1990 in the National Parks Camp. Other examples were found in Ndumo Game Reserve in 2005. The first males to be described were found in the Hwange National Park in 1999, mature and juvenile examples. The first to be found in South Africa was discovered in the Kruger National Park in 2006. The spider lives on the bark of the fever tree and mopane. Its conservation status is considered of least concern.
