= Afrobeata magnifica =

Scientific classification
- Kingdom: Animalia
- Phylum: Arthropoda
- Subphylum: Chelicerata
- Class: Arachnida
- Order: Araneae
- Infraorder: Araneomorphae
- Family: Salticidae
- Genus: Afrobeata
- Species: A. magnifica

Binomial name
- Afrobeata magnifica Wesołowska & Russell-Smith, 2000

Species of spider

Afrobeata magnifica is a species of jumping spider in the genus Afrobeata that lives in Tanzania. The species was first described in 2000 by Wanda Wesołowska and Anthony Russell-Smith. The spider has an olive-green carapace measuring between typically 2.8 mm (0.11 in) long and a brown abdomen 2.9 mm (0.11 in) long. The male has a pattern of two large light diagonal stripes on its abdomen. The front legs of the male are longer than the rest. The copulatory organs are distinctive.. The male has a characteristically small palpal femur and a small appendage on its palpal tibia, or tibial apophysis that has two sections, one blunt and the other sharp. The female has not been described.

== Taxonomy ==
Afrobeata magnifica is a species of jumping spider that was first described by Wanda Wesołowska and Anthony Russell-Smith in 2000. It was one of over 500 species identified by the Polish arachnologist Wesołowska during her career, making her one of the most prolific authors in the field. They allocated it to the genus Afrobeata, first circumscribed by Ludovico di Caporiacco in 1941. The genus is similar to Beata and Simaetha, particularly in the shape of the spider's cephalothorax. The species is named for a Latin word that can be translated "magnificent".

In Wayne Maddison's 2015 study of spider phylogenetic classification, the genus Afrobeata was tentatively placed to the subtribe Plexippina because the female has pockets on the edges of its epigyne and tufts near its eyes like the genera Hyllus and Thyene. It is a member of the tribe Plexippini, in the subclade Simonida in the clade Saltafresia. During the following year, Jerzy Prószyński grouped the genus with nine other genera of jumping spiders under the name Hyllines, which was named after Hyllus. He used the shape of the male's embolus as a distinguishing sign for the group. Hyllines was itself tentatively placed within a supergroup named Hylloida.

== Description ==
Afrobeata magnifica is a medium-sized spider. The spider's body consists of two main sections, a cephalothorax and an abdomen. The male has a rather high carapace, the hard upper part of the cephalothorax, that is typically 2.8 mm (0.11 in) long and 2.5 mm (0.1 in) wide. High and rounded with a shape that is widest near the spider's eyes, it is generally brown. It has a short eye field with bristles around the eyes. The first row of eyes curved forward and some of the eyes are widely spaced. The carapace is covered in a dense covering of short grey hairs. Light hairs can be found on the spider's low face, or clypeus. The mouthparts are distinctive. The chelicerae are large and have a single tooth on the base of the fang to the front and two teeth to the rear. The labium is brown. The brown maxillae are marked with light edges.

The male spider has an oval abdomen that is narrower than the carapace. It is typically 2.9 mm (0.11 in) long and 1.7 mm (0.07 in) wide. The topside is generally olive-grey with a black area in the centre. Towards the front there are two large diagonal white stripes. It is covered with short brown hairs with a scattering of bristles. The spinnerets are greyish. The legs are brown and have brown leg hairs and many spines. The front legs are longer and darker than the others with longer hairs. The spider also has small brown pedipalps.

The spider has distinctive copulatory organs. The pedipalp has a tibia that has a very small appendage on it, called a tibial apophysis. The apophysis consists of two parts, a larger blunt section out of which extends a narrow pointed part, the whole looking something like a mitten from one side and like two separate appendages from another. The tibia has long hairs. The palpal bulb is round. A long thin embolus projects from the side of the bulb and circles round it until it emanates from near the front. The palpal femur is small with a shallow depression visible on its surface. These features of the femur, helps distinguish the spider from the otherwise similar Afrobeata firma. The female has not been described.

== Distribution and habitat ==
Afrobeata magnifica is endemic to Tanzania. The holotype was collected in the Mkomazi National Park in 1996. It thrives amongst plants of the Commiphora genus.
