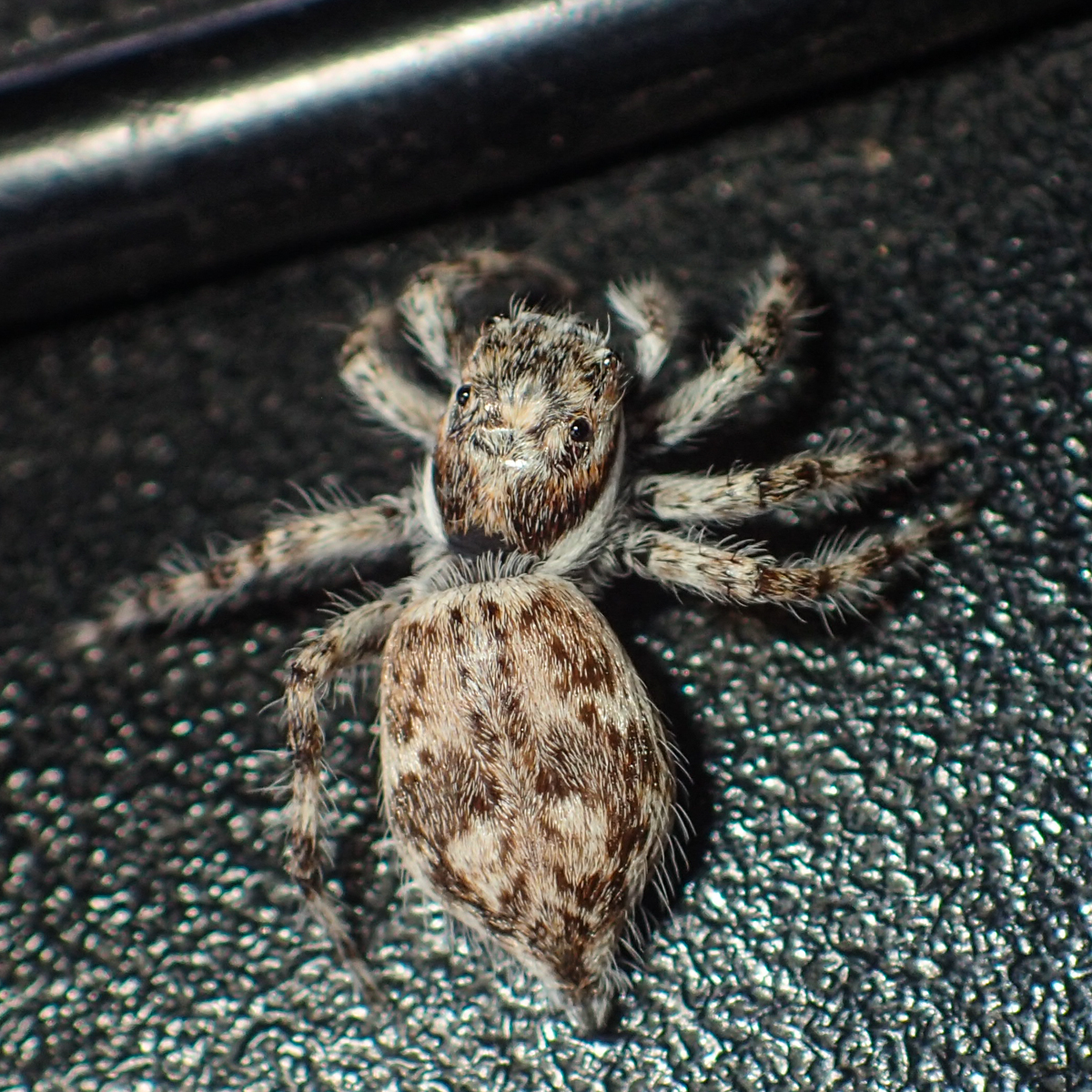
- M. nigli from Cambodia

Scientific classification
- Kingdom: Animalia
- Phylum: Arthropoda
- Subphylum: Chelicerata
- Class: Arachnida
- Order: Araneae
- Infraorder: Araneomorphae
- Family: Salticidae
- Genus: Menemerus
- Species: M. nigli

Binomial name
- Menemerus nigli Wesołowska & Freudenschuss, 2012

= Menemerus nigli =

Species of jumping spider

Menemerus nigli is a species of jumping spider that was first found in Pakistan. A member of the genus Menemerus, the male was described in 2012 by Wanda Wesołowska and Mario Freudenschuss and the female by Pir Asmat Ali, Wayne Maddison, Muhammad Zahid and Abida Butt in 2018. It was originally only found in Asia but has also been introduced into Brazil, the first specimen being identified in 2020. First found amongst stones, it seems to thrive synanthropically amongst the sunlit stucco walls that are common in cities across the region. Menemerus nigli is used as an example of the ability of species that adapt to human habitation to expand their ecological niche and become widespread species. The spider is medium-sized, typically 4.89 millimetres (0.193 in) in length, with a dark brown carapace and grey-brown abdomen that has a distinctive cream and white pattern created by small hairs. This pattern on its abdomen helps distinguish the species from other spiders in the genus.

== Taxonomy and etymology ==
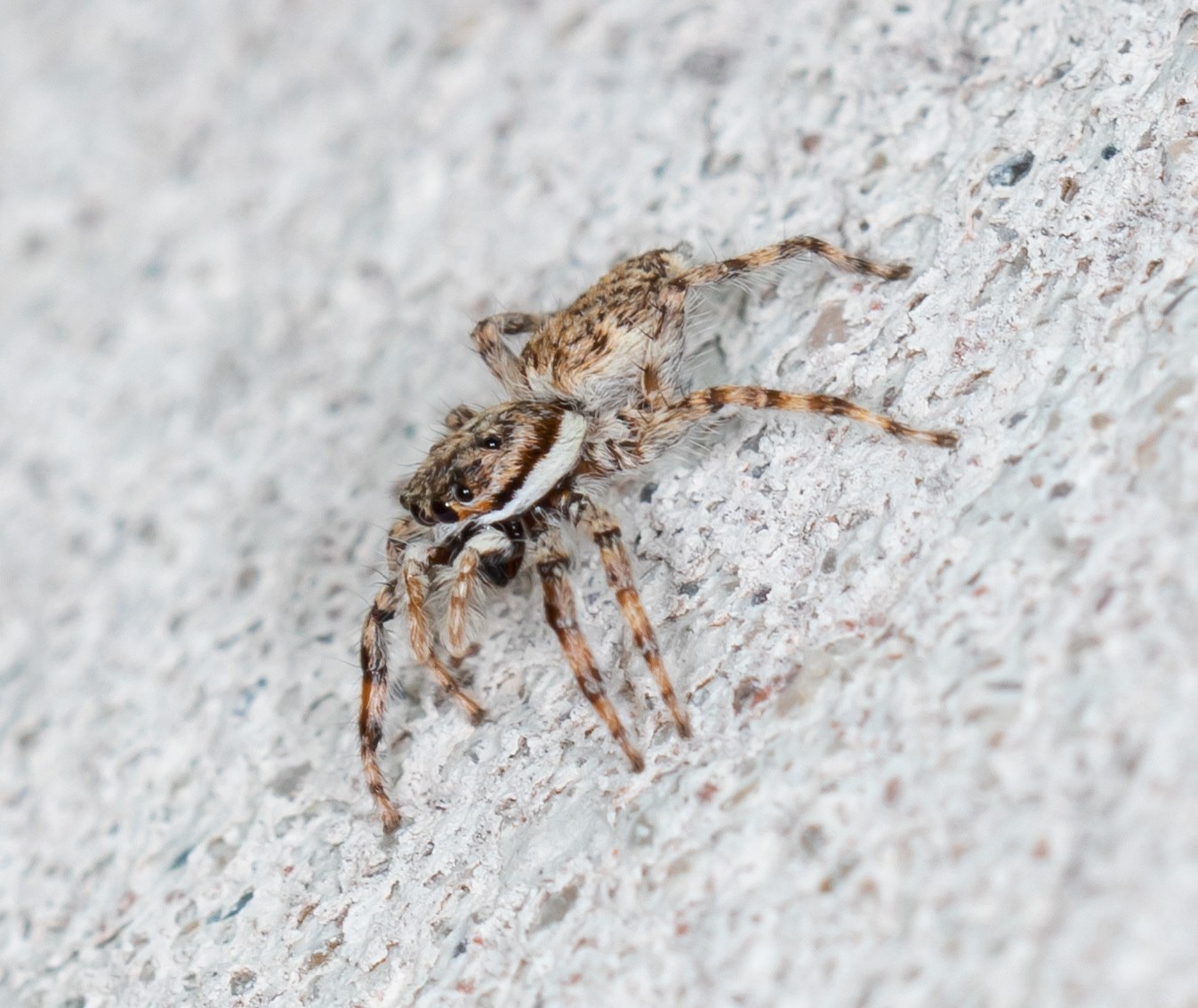
M. nigli on a ruin in Thailand

Menemerus affinis is a species of jumping spider, a member of the family Salticidae, that was first described by the arachnologists Wanda Wesołowska and Mario Freudenschuss in 2012. They allocated it to the genus Menemerus. The holotype is stored in the Natural History Museum, Vienna. Initially, only the male of the species was identified, with the first description of the female being by Pir Asmat Ali, Wayne Maddison, Muhammad Zahid and Abida Butt in 2018. The genus was first circumscribed in 1868 by Eugène Simon and contains over 60 species. The genus name derives from two Greek words, meaning "certainly" and "diurnal". The species is dedicated to Johannes Nigl, a mentor and friend of Freudenschuss, which is the basis of its specific name. It is one of over 500 species identified by Wesołowska over her career.

Menemerus shares some characteristics, including having narrow, oval, fixed embolus, with the genera Hypaeus and Pellenes. Phylogenetic analysis has shown that the genus is related to the genera Helvetia and Phintella and is classified in the tribe Chrysillini. Chrysillines are monophyletic. The tribe is ubiquitous across most of the continents of the world. It is allocated to the subclade Saltafresia in the clade Salticoida. In 2016, Jerzy Prószyński created a group of genera named Menemerines after the genus. The vast majority of the species in Menemerines are members of the genus, with additional examples from Kima and Leptorchestes.

== Description ==
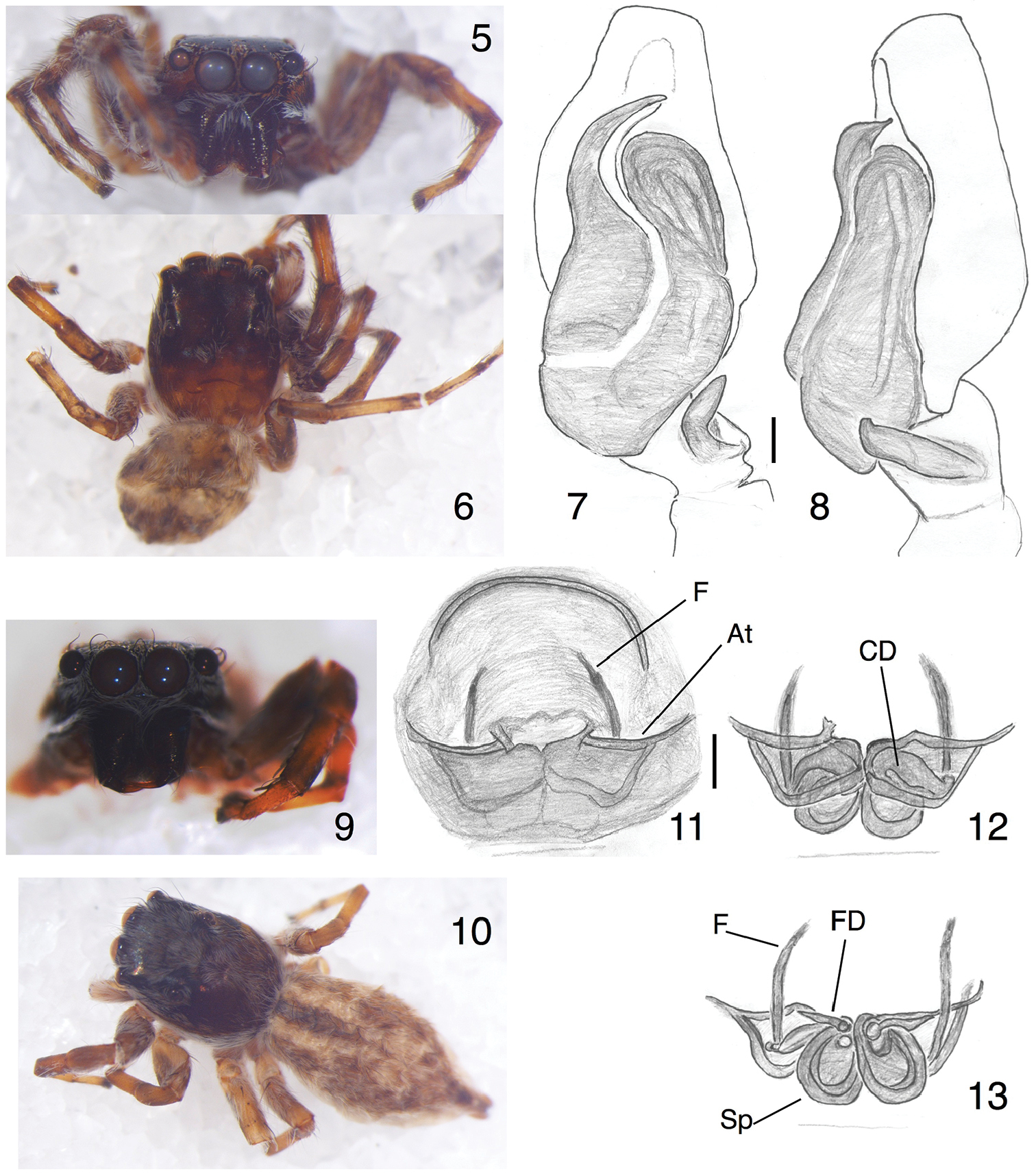
Views and details of male (5–8) and female (9–15) Menemerus nigli

Menemerus nigli is a medium-sized spider, with total length of approximately 4.89 millimetres (0.193 in). The male is slightly smaller than the female. The female has a cephalothorax, its forward section, which measures typically 2.82 millimetres (0.111 in), 0.1 millimetres (0.0039 in) longer than the male, and, behind this, an abdomen 1.04 millimetres (0.041 in) longer at 3.76 millimetres (0.148 in). The width of the carapace, the hard upper side of its cephalothorax, for both is 2.06 millimetres (0.081 in), while its abdomen measures between 3.06 and 3.16 millimetres (0.120 and 0.124 in) wide. Its carapace is dark brown and oval and covered in white and fawn hairs. A pattern of dense white hairs makes it look as if the spider has a streak of white across it that extends to the front of its carapace and its very low clypeus, part of its face. Its eye field is black. Its sternum, the underside of the cephalothorax, is light brown. Large and dark brown, the chelicerae are unidentate, having only one tooth on its rear margins. Its remaining mouthparts, including its labium and maxillae, are light brown. The female has two teeth at the front of its chelicerae and long fangs.

The spider's abdomen is smaller and narrower than its carapace, and is brownish-grey. The male has six large patches on its upper surface. The female's abdomen has cream markings and white hairs on its top. These give a distinctive pattern. The underside of the spider's abdomen is grey with a few white hairs visible. The female has yellow spinnerets, used for spinning webs. In contrast, the male's spinnerets are grey. Its front legs are brown and stouter than the others. They are brown while the remainder are yellow with brown patches. They all have a dense covering of brown and white hairs. Its leg spines are brown.

The spider has distinctive copulatory organs. The male has large yellow pedipalps, sensory organs near the front of the spider, that have white hairs. Its palpal tibia is short and has a pronounced spike known as a tibal apophyses. Its palpal bulb consists of a tegulum that is shaped like an elongated oval and has a furrow that runs down its external surface between its haematodocha. Projecting from the tegulum is a relatively long thin projection called an embolus, which has a large membranous conductor lying next to it. Alongside the tegulum the spider has an elongated cymbium that acts as a protective glove for the palpal bulb. Its cymbium is covered in short white hairs called setae.

The female has broad bowl-like indentations in its epigyne, the visible external part of its copulatory organs. It has an opening at the front, shown in Figure 11 with the designation A, which has a sharp fold on its inner wall, labelled F, that Ali, Maddison, Zahid and Butt thought may serve as a guide for the male's embolus. The spider's copulatory openings lead, via relatively large insemination ducts shown with the designation CD in Figure 12, to round spermathecae or receptacles, marked as Sp in Figure 13. These are positioned to the middle of the epigyne and overlap. Internally, running perpendicular to the fold, lie two fertilisation ducts, labelled FD in Figure 13.

The spider is similar to two other species in the same genus, Menemerus pilosus and Menemerus zimbabwensis, both found in Africa, differing in the abdominal pattern. The embolus is larger than other species in the genus. The female is distinguished from other Menemerus species by the distinctive folds that extend from the broad forward-facing copulatory duct. The juvenile male is generally darker in appearance and can be identified by its club-shaped cymbium at the end of its pedipalp. The adult male has white hairs on the side of the chelicerae.

== Distribution and habitat ==
Menemerus is primarily an African genus but spiders are found throughout Africa and Asia, and have been recorded as far as Latin America. Menemerus nigli was first found in western Pakistan by Wanda Wesołowska and Mario Freudenschuss. This was the second example of the genus to be recorded in the country. The spider has also been found in India and Thailand. The species has a wide range, extending over 4,500 kilometres (2,800 mi). A specimen in West Bengal, India, was confirmed as Menemerus nigli by comparing the DNA barcode in 2017. It was the fifth species of the genus found in the country. The spider was first identified in Thailand in 2020. Many of the images of Menemerus fulvus posted online may depict Menemerus nigli and so the species's distribution may be over a wider area of south and south-east Asia than has been confirmed.

The spider has also successfully established itself in Latin America. In 2020, Rafael M. Mariante and David E. Hill identified examples of the species from three sites in Rio de Janeiro, Brazil. It is likely that the species is an accidental migrant, carried along international trade routes. This distance led Mariante and Hill to consider that the species has an even wider distribution.

The spider was first found under stones. It was also subsequently found to live on stoney ground and synanthropically on indoor walls and on exterior walls where humans live. It seems to be comfortable in ruins as well as places of current habitation. However, it seems to particularly thrive on the painted and stuccoed walls that can be found in cities like Rio de Janeiro and others across the region. The evidence that it has found a niche in urban structures supports the view that species that can adapt to habitats created by people may be more successful when introduced to a new and far away habitat.
