= Pelegrin Franganillo-Balboa =

Spanish arachnologist (1873–1955)

Pelegrín Franganillo Balboa
- Born: 4 December 1873; Molinaseca, Spain
- Died: 1955 (aged 81–82); Havana, Cuba
- Citizenship: Cuban
- Education: Colegio Máximo, Oña
- Known for: Arachnological research, description of spider taxa
- Scientific career
- Fields: Arachnology, Natural history
- Workplaces: Colegio de Belén, Havana; Colegio Dolores, Santiago de Cuba

Pelegrín Franganillo Balboa (4 December 1873 – 1955) was a Spanish-born Cuban arachnologist and naturalist, as well as a Jesuit priest. He is known for his studies on Iberian spiders and for describing numerous spider taxa.

== Biography ==
In 1889, after completing classical and philosophical studies at the Colegio Máximo of Oña, he joined the Jesuits and was ordained as a priest in 1904. In 1905, he began his academic career as a professor of biology and natural science at the Jesuit college Apóstol Santiago in Camposancos, a civil parish in the municipality of A Guarda, in Galicia. During these years, he developed an interest in arachnology, publishing a study on the species of the genus Argiope found in the delta of the Miño River ("Arañas de la familia de los Argiópidae observadas en la desembocadura del Miño", 1908).

In 1909, he was transferred to Asturias to teach at the La Inmaculada college in Gijón, and in 1918 he moved to Havana, Cuba, where he held a chair of natural sciences at the prestigious Colegio de Belén until his death, except for the period between 1946 and 1955 when he taught at the Colegio Dolores in Santiago de Cuba. Shortly before moving to Cuba, he published one of his most important works in arachnology: "Las Arañas, manual de araneología", a comprehensive summary of his studies on Iberian spider species, containing one of the earliest detailed descriptions of ballooning, a dispersal technique used by various spiders.

== Described taxa ==
Some taxa described by Franganillo include:

- Paraplexippus – genus of spiders in the family Salticidae
- Pelegrina – genus of spiders in the family Salticidae
- Eustala uncicurva – spider in the family Araneidae
- Spintharidius viridis – spider in the family Araneidae
- Witica alobatus – spider in the family Araneidae
- Araneus angulatus niger – subspecies of spider in the family Araneidae
- Araneus angulatus nitidifolius – subspecies of spider in the family Araneidae
- Araneus angulatus pallidus – subspecies of spider in the family Araneidae
- Araneus angulatus personatus – subspecies of spider in the family Araneidae (described by Simon, 1929)

== Taxa named in his honor ==
- Noegus franganilloi – spider in the family Salticidae (Caporiacco, 1947)
- Rualena balboae – spider in the family Agelenidae (Schenkel, 1950)
- Tetragnatha franganilloi – spider in the family Tetragnathidae (Brignoli, 1983)
- Anchoviella balboae – fish in the family Engraulidae (D. S. Jordan & Seale, 1926)
- Euclia balboae – gastropod mollusc in the family Cancellariidae (Pilsbry, 1931)
