= Gratianna =

Scientific classification
- Kingdom: Animalia
- Phylum: Arthropoda
- Subphylum: Chelicerata
- Class: Arachnida
- Order: Araneae
- Infraorder: Araneomorphae
- Family: Salticidae
- Tribe: Plexippini
- Genus: Gratianna; Caleb, 2025

Type species
- Carrhotus assam Caleb, 2020

Species
- 3, see text

Genus of spiders

Gratianna is a genus of spiders in the family Salticidae.

== Distribution ==
Gratianna is found in India, Nepal and China.

== Etymology ==
The genus is named after T. Caleb's daughter, Joanna Gratia.

== Species ==
As of January 2026, this genus includes three species:

- Gratianna assam (Caleb, 2020) – India, Nepal
- Gratianna bowu (Lin, Wang & Ruan, 2024) – China
- Gratianna yunnanensis (Song, 1991) – China
