= I. orientalis =

I. orientalis may refer to:

- Idastrandia orientalis, a jumping spider species endemic to Singapore
- Iris orientalis, an Iris from Turkey and Greece

== Synonyms ==
- Iguanodon orientalis, a synonym for Altirhinus, an ornithopod dinosaur species from the Early Cretaceous Period of Mongolia

== See also ==
- Orientalis (disambiguation)
