= Vailima =

Vailima may refer to:

- Vailima, Samoa is a village in Samoa, notable as the last residence of Robert Louis Stevenson
- Vailima (spider) is a genus of jumping spiders
- Vailima (beer) is a beer brewed in Samoa by Samoa Breweries Limited
- Vailima Orchard is an apple farm in Richmond, New Zealand
