= Ghatippus =

Scientific classification
- Kingdom: Animalia
- Phylum: Arthropoda
- Subphylum: Chelicerata
- Class: Arachnida
- Order: Araneae
- Infraorder: Araneomorphae
- Family: Salticidae
- Tribe: Plexippini
- Subtribe: Plexippina
- Genus: Ghatippus; Marathe & Maddison, 2024
- Species: G. paschima

Binomial name
- Ghatippus paschima Marathe & Maddison, 2024

Genus in Salticidae

Ghatippus is a genus of spiders in the family Salticidae. It was first described by Kiran Marathe, Wayne Paul Maddison, and Krushnamegh Kunte in 2024, and is found in the Western Ghats of India. As of 2024, it contains only one species, Ghatippus paschima.
