= Afrobeata firma =

Scientific classification
- Kingdom: Animalia
- Phylum: Arthropoda
- Subphylum: Chelicerata
- Class: Arachnida
- Order: Araneae
- Infraorder: Araneomorphae
- Family: Salticidae
- Genus: Afrobeata
- Species: A. firma

Binomial name
- Afrobeata firma Wesołowska & van Harten, 1994

Species of spider

Afrobeata firma is a species of jumping spider in the genus Afrobeata that lives in Yemen. The species was first described in 1994 by Wanda Wesołowska and Antonius van Harten. The spider has a carapace measuring between 2.9 and 3.6 mm (0.11 and 0.14 in) long and an abdomen between 2.9 and 4.2 mm (0.11 and 0.17 in) long. It is generally dark brown, although the underside is lighter. The male has a pattern of chevrons and spots on its abdomen. The female has shiny scales. The male also has distinctively-shaped teeth to the rear of the chelicerae while the female has a single bicuspid tooth. The front legs of the male are longer than the rest. The female copulatory organs are similar to the related Afrobeata latithorax but the seminal ducts are distinctive. They are complex and coiled, surrounding the heavily sclerotized spermathecae. The male has a small tooth-like appendage on its palpal tibia, or tibial apophysis, and a very long thin embolus that circles the round palpal bulb.

== Taxonomy ==
Afrobeata firma is a species of jumping spider that was first described by Wanda Wesołowska and Antonius van Harten in 1994. It was one of over 500 species identified by the Polish arachnologist Wesołowska during her career, making her one of the most prolific authors in the field. They allocated it to the genus Afrobeata, first circumscribed by Ludovico di Caporiacco in 1941. The genus is similar to Beata and Simaetha, particularly in the shape of the spider's cephalothorax.

In Wayne Maddison's 2015 study of spider phylogenetic classification, the genus Afrobeata was tentatively placed to the subtribe Plexippina because the female has pockets on the edges of its epigyne and tufts near its eyes like Hyllus and Thyene. This is a member of the tribe Plexippini, in the subclade Simonida in the clade Saltafresia. In the following year, Jerzy Prószyński grouped the genus with nine other genera of jumping spiders under the name Hyllines, which was named after Hyllus. He used the shape of the male's embolus as a distinguishing sign for the group. Hyllines was itself tentatively placed within a supergroup named Hylloida.

== Description ==
Afrobeata firma is a medium-sized spider. The male has a rather high carapace, the hard upper part of the cephalothorax, that is typically 3.6 mm (0.14 in) long and 3.3 mm (0.13 in) wide. It is wide, particularly around the eyes, and flattened to the back, generally dark brown with short grey hairs. The eye field is a darker trapezoid with long brown bristles around the eyes themselves. The underside, or sternum, is brown. The spider's face, or clypeus, is covered in white hairs. The mouthparts are distinctive. The chelicerae are large and dark brown and also has white hairs to its base. It has a single tooth on the base of the fang to the front and two distinctively-shaped teeth to the rear. The labium is brown. The brown maxillae is marked with light edges.

The male spider has an elongated abdomen that narrows to the end. It is typically 3.4 mm (0.13 in) long and 2.2 mm (0.09 in) wide. The top is dark brown and has a covering of light and dark hairs, longer to the edges, interspersed with a few brown bristles. It has a slightly lighter indistinct pattern that consists of a series of four short stripes that are chevrons near the rear, broken chevrons in the middle and separate spots to the front. There is another broken stripe across the front and a black stripe marking the very front. The pattern is more distinctive on younger spiders. The underside is orange with a wide dark stripe across it. The spinnerets are greyish-yellow. The legs are brown and have brown leg hairs and spines. The front legs are longer and darker than the others with longer hairs. The spider also has dark pedipalps.

The spider has distinctive copulatory organs. The pedipalp has an unusually long femur and tibia. The tibia has a very small appendage on it, called a tibial apophysis that is shaped like a tooth that is mounted on what looks like a small projection coming out of the tibia. The tibia has long hairs. The palpal bulb is round. A long thin embolus projects from the side of the bulb and circles round it until it emanates from near the front. It seems to fit within its own valley in the bulb.

The female is similar in shape to the male. The carapace is smaller and narrower, and measures between 2.9 and 3.2 mm (0.11 and 0.13 in) in length and 2.7 and 3 mm (0.11 and 0.12 in) in width. It is dark brown with a very dark, nearly black, eye field. The underside is lighter brown. It has what looks like horns near its eyes made of very long bristles. The chelicerae are also dark brown and have two teeth at the front and a single bicuspid tooth to the rear. The labium and maxillae are light brown.

The female abdomen can be larger than the carapace, depending on the spider, between 2.9 and 4.2 mm (0.11 and 0.17 in) long and 1.7 and 2.7 mm (0.07 and 0.11 in) wide. It is dark brown with a covering of shiny scales. It has short hairs to its edges. The spinnerets are brown and the legs have a light stripe on them but otherwise are similarly brown. The leg hairs and spines are brown like the male but the pedipalps are light.

The female copulatory organs are also distinctive. The epigyne is similar to Afrobeata latithorax but has unusual seminal ducts. The epigyne has a large shallow depression in the middle and two small pockets to the very rear in a channel called the epigastric furrow. The copulatory openings lead to complex, initially part helical, seminal ducts that have slight sclerotization. The ducts lead through a complex set of coils to rather straight terminals. The spermathecae nestle in amongst the ducts, are bean-shaped and have very heavy sclerotization.

== Distribution and habitat ==
Afrobeata firma was the first species of the genus to be identified outside Africa. It is endemic to Socotra, Yemen. The holotype was collected near Hadibo in 1993. Other examples have been found near Deksam, Homhil and Mogasu, and between Mahfirhin and Steroh, in 1999 and 2000.
