= Vailimia masinei =

Scientific classification
- Kingdom: Animalia
- Phylum: Arthropoda
- Subphylum: Chelicerata
- Class: Arachnida
- Order: Araneae
- Infraorder: Araneomorphae
- Family: Salticidae
- Genus: Vailimia
- Species: V. masinei

Binomial name
- Vailimia masinei (Peckham & Peckham, 1907)

Species of spider

Vailimia masinei is a species of jumping spider in the family Salticidae. It is found in Borneo.
