= Idastrandia =

Scientific classification
- Kingdom: Animalia
- Phylum: Arthropoda
- Subphylum: Chelicerata
- Class: Arachnida
- Order: Araneae
- Infraorder: Araneomorphae
- Family: Salticidae
- Genus: Idastrandia
- Species: I. orientalis

Binomial name
- Idastrandia orientalis (Szombathy, 1915)

Synonyms
- Pseudamycus orientalis; Ida-strandia orientalis; Kolomana orientalis

Genus of spiders

Idastrandia is a genus of jumping spiders endemic to Singapore. Its only described species is Idastrandia orientalis.

Kálmán Szombathy described a single male in 1915, which is about five millimeters long. There are drawings in the original description, and the male pedipalp and unusual serrate cheliceral tooth has been drawn by Proszynski in 1983. It has still not been attached to any of the current salticid groups.

== Name ==
The genus is probably named after a relative of first describer Embrik Strand.
