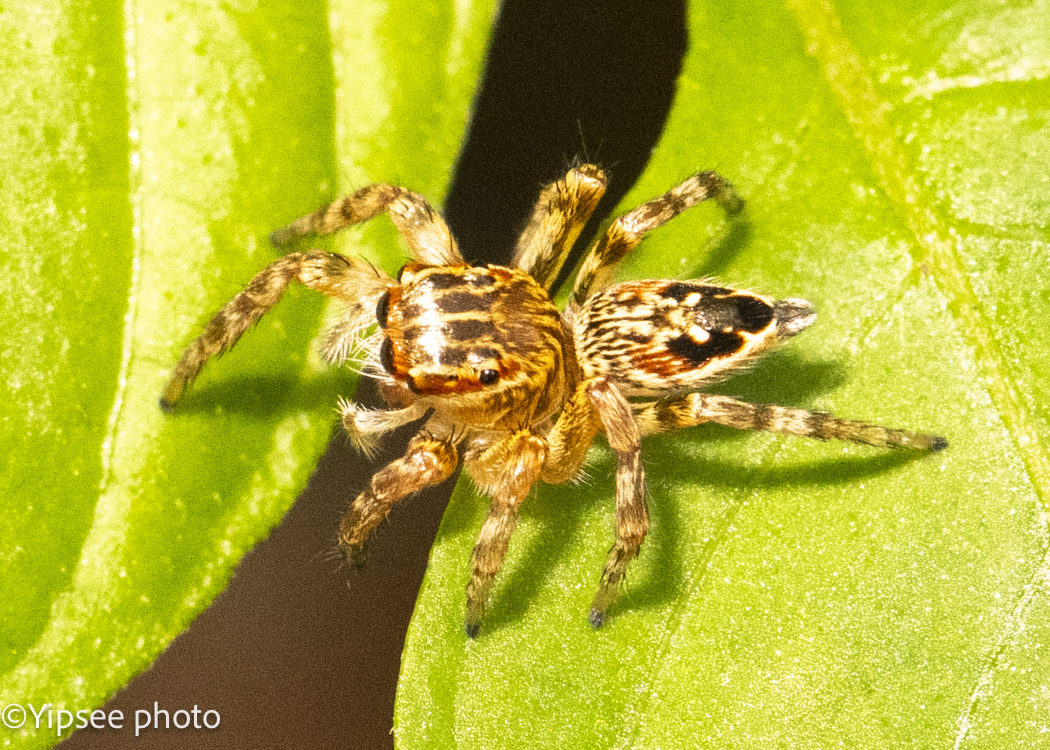
- female from Thailand
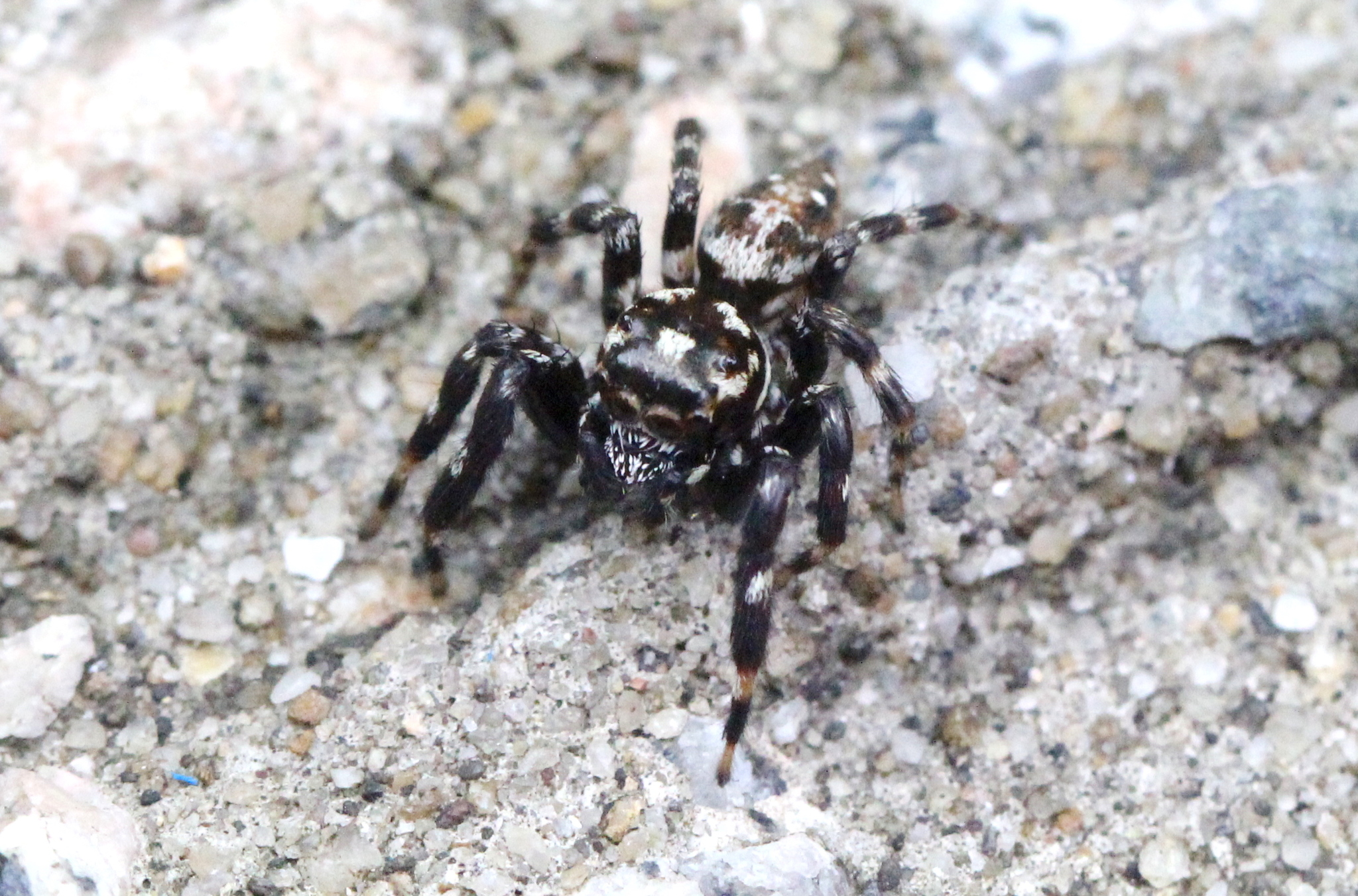
- male from Hong Kong

Scientific classification
- Kingdom: Animalia
- Phylum: Arthropoda
- Subphylum: Chelicerata
- Class: Arachnida
- Order: Araneae
- Infraorder: Araneomorphae
- Family: Salticidae
- Genus: Burmattus
- Species: B. albopunctatus

Binomial name
- Burmattus albopunctatus (Thorell, 1895)

Synonyms
- Plexippus albo-punctatus Thorell, 1895; Plexippus pocockii Thorell, 1895; Burmattus pococki (Thorell, 1895); Burmattus sinicus Prószyński, 1992

= Burmattus albopunctatus =

Four-dotted grass spider

Species of jumping spider

Burmattus albopunctatus is a jumping spider species in the genus Burmattus. It is widely distributed across Asia, from northwest India to the southwestern islands of Japan, and south to the Malay Peninsula.

== Taxonomy ==
The species was originally described by Tamerlan Thorell in 1895 as Plexippus albo-punctatus, based on female specimens from Myanmar. In the same publication, Thorell also described Plexippus pocockii from the same locality, based on both male and female specimens. For many decades, these were treated as separate species and later transferred to the genus Burmattus by Prószyński in 1992.

Recent taxonomic research by Logunov in 2024 demonstrated that B. albopunctatus and B. pocockii represent the same species, with B. albopunctatus taking priority as it was described earlier in Thorell's 1895 paper. The study also synonymized Burmattus sinicus Prószyński, 1992 with B. albopunctatus, as the male specimens were found to be indistinguishable.

== Distribution ==
B. albopunctatus has a wide distribution across tropical and subtropical Asia. It has been recorded from India, China, Japan (Ryukyu Islands), Myanmar, Thailand, Vietnam, Malaysia, and Singapore.

== Habitat ==
The species inhabits various environments including secondary jungle, mangroves, tall grasslands, and understorey vegetation. It has been found at elevations ranging from sea level to approximately 1500 meters.

== Description ==
B. albopunctatus is a medium-sized jumping spider.

In males, the palp has a distinctive sabre-like embolus, a long retrolateral tibial apophysis that bends at the tip, and a cluster of curved bristles located at the retrolateral cymbial projection.

Females have characteristic reproductive structures including a deep, heavily sclerotized epigynal pocket positioned forward from the epigastric furrow, slit-like copulatory openings that are typically hidden beneath prominent sclerotized rims, and a vulva consisting of two pear-shaped receptacles connected by short, wide insemination ducts.
