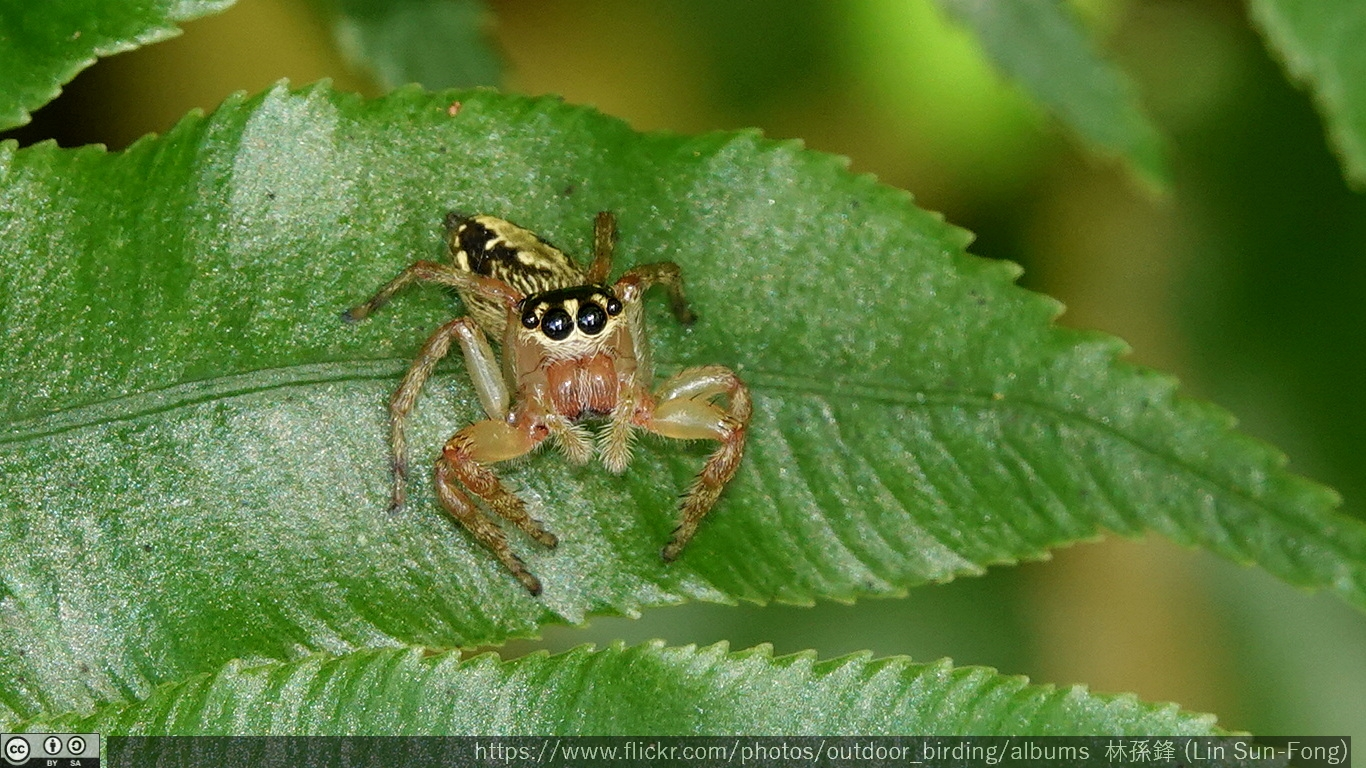

Scientific classification
- Kingdom: Animalia
- Phylum: Arthropoda
- Subphylum: Chelicerata
- Class: Arachnida
- Order: Araneae
- Infraorder: Araneomorphae
- Family: Salticidae
- Genus: Yaginumaella
- Species: Y. lobata

Binomial name
- Yaginumaella lobata Peng, Tso & Li, 2002

= Yaginumaella lobata =

Species of spider

Yaginumaella lobata is a jumping spider.

== Appearance ==
The species resembles Y. urbanii.

== Name ==
The specific name is derived from the bulbous lobe of the palpal organ.

== Distribution ==
Y. lobata is only known from Taiwan.
