= Baryphas parvulus =

Ndumo Baryphas Jumping Spider

Scientific classification
- Kingdom: Animalia
- Phylum: Arthropoda
- Subphylum: Chelicerata
- Class: Arachnida
- Order: Araneae
- Infraorder: Araneomorphae
- Family: Salticidae
- Genus: Baryphas
- Species: B. parvulus

Binomial name
- Baryphas parvulus Haddad & Vickers, 2024

Species of spider

Baryphas parvulus is a species of spider in the family Salticidae. It is endemic to South Africa and is commonly known as the Ndumo Baryphas jumping spider.

== Distribution ==
Baryphas parvulus is found only in South Africa. The species is known only from Ndumo Game Reserve in KwaZulu-Natal Province.

== Habitat and ecology ==
B. parvulus is a foliage-dweller and has been collected from dense savanna woodlands by beating and canopy fogging.

== Conservation ==
Baryphas parvulus is listed as Data Deficient for taxonomic reasons. The species is known only from the female and the type locality. The status of the species remains obscure. Some more sampling is needed to determine the species' range and collect the male.
