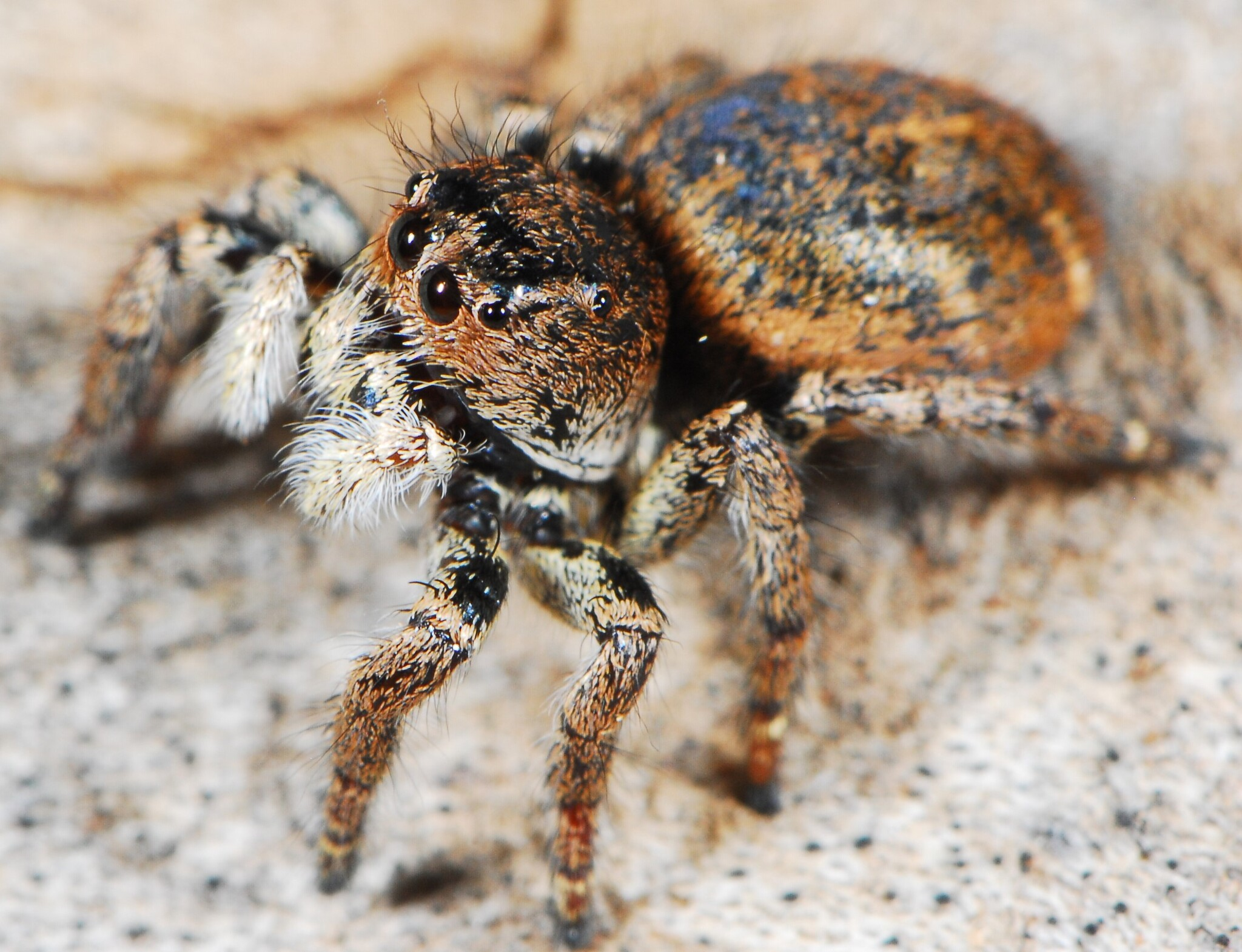
- female
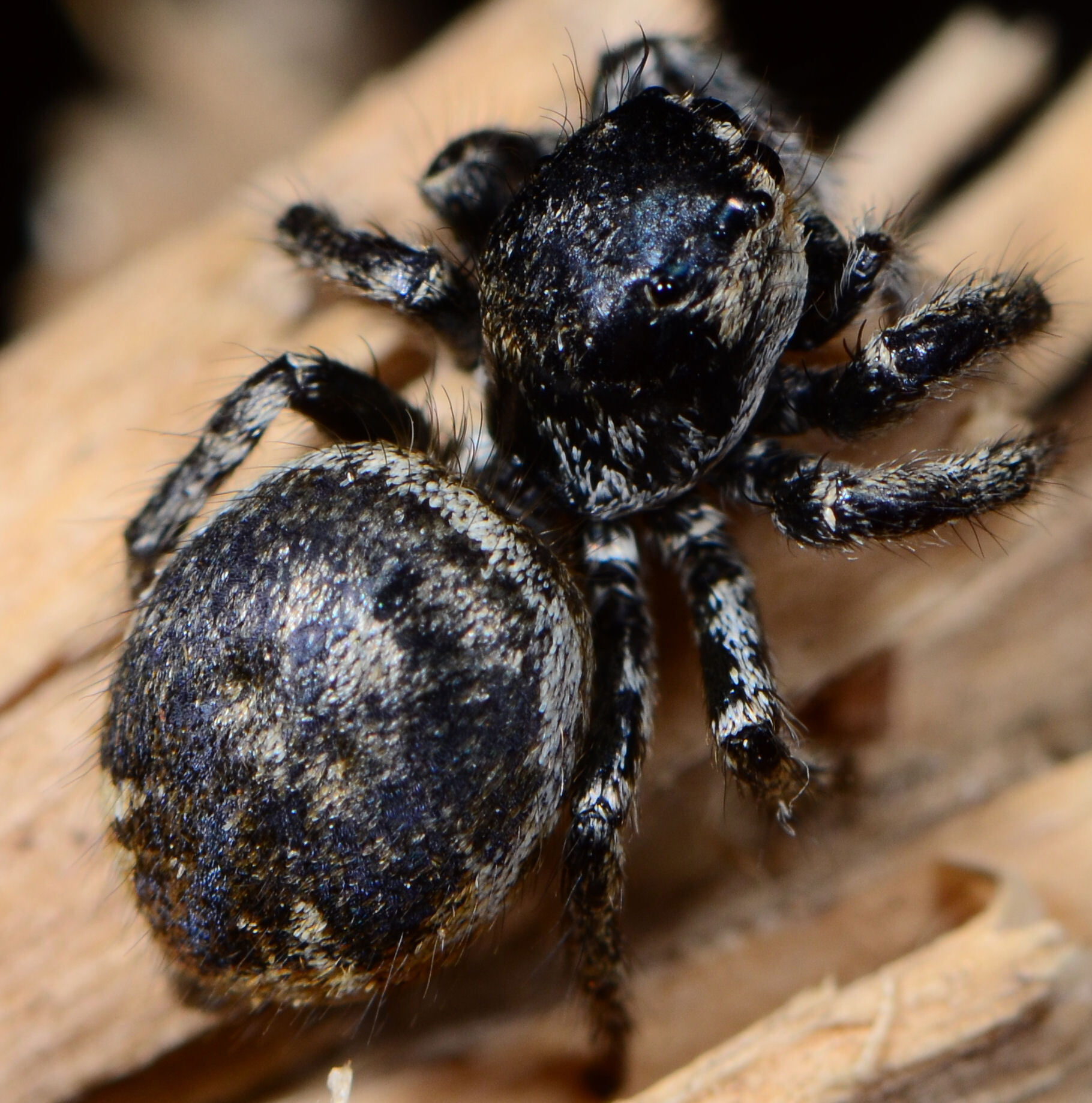
- male

Scientific classification
- Kingdom: Animalia
- Phylum: Arthropoda
- Subphylum: Chelicerata
- Class: Arachnida
- Order: Araneae
- Infraorder: Araneomorphae
- Family: Salticidae
- Genus: Baryphas
- Species: B. ahenus

Binomial name
- Baryphas ahenus Simon, 1902

Synonyms
- Heliophanus berlandi Lawrence, 1937

= Baryphas ahenus =

Common Baryphas Jumping Spider

Species of spider

Baryphas ahenus is a species of spider in the family Salticidae. It is found in Africa and is commonly known as the common Baryphas jumping spider.

== Distribution ==
Baryphas ahenus is found in Tanzania, Zimbabwe, Mozambique and South Africa.

In South Africa, the species has a very wide distribution and is found in all nine provinces. Notable locations include Addo Elephant National Park, Golden Gate Highlands National Park, Kruger National Park, Table Mountain National Park, and more than 10 other protected areas.

== Habitat and ecology ==
This species is very common and is frequently collected by beating the foliage of shrubs and trees.

Individuals are usually found on leaves, except for juveniles, which are sometimes present on flowers and occasionally on grasses. They are sampled from different plant species, many with smooth, shiny, broad leaves.

Their retreats are built between either two or three leaves sewn together with silk, in axils of leaves, or among flower-heads. They are commonly found in gardens and are either solitary or paired.

They were sampled from all of the biomes except the Desert at altitudes ranging from sea level to 1,836 m. They have also been sampled from agroecosystems such as citrus, maize, pine plantations and strawberries.

== Description ==
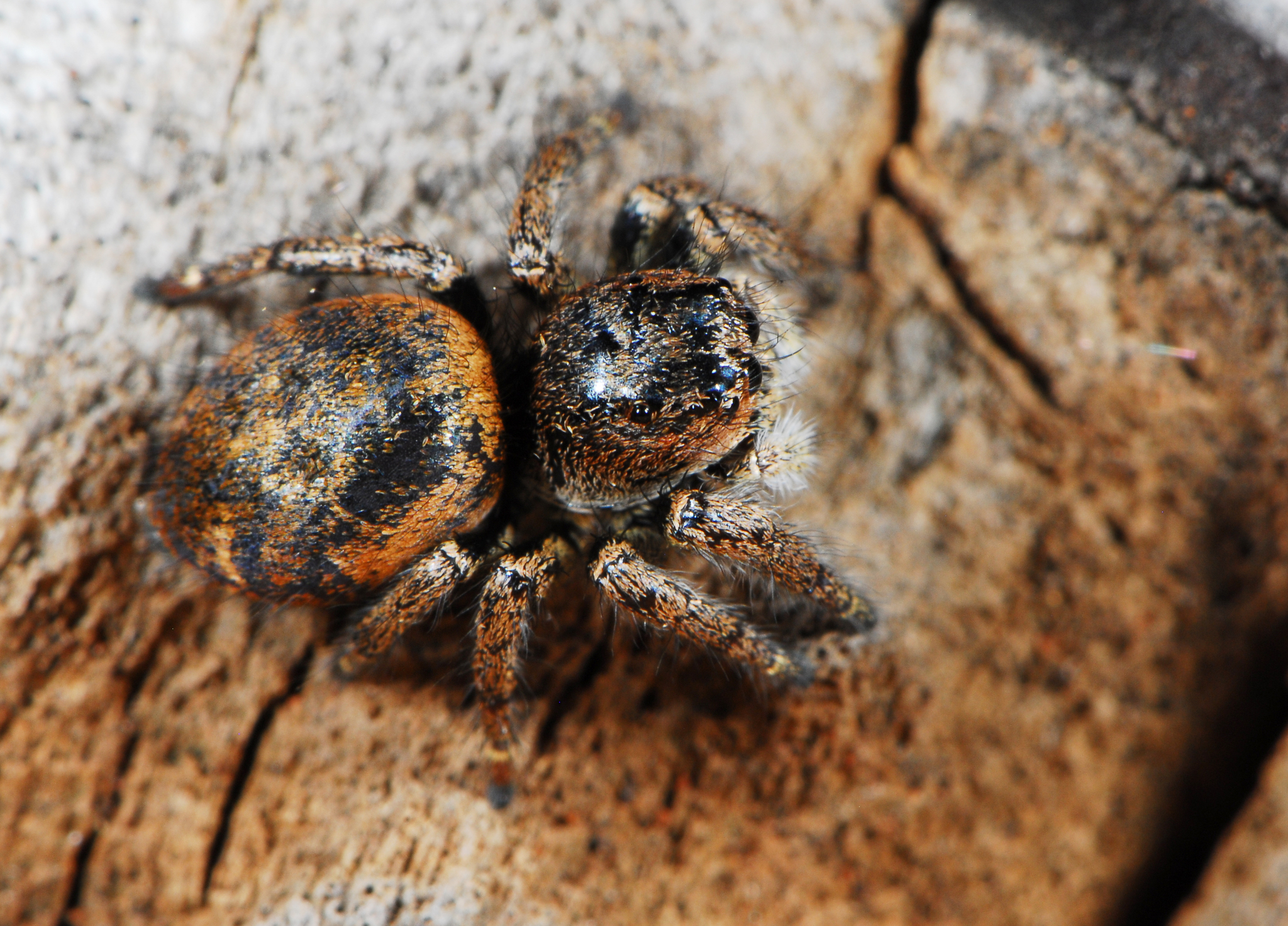
female

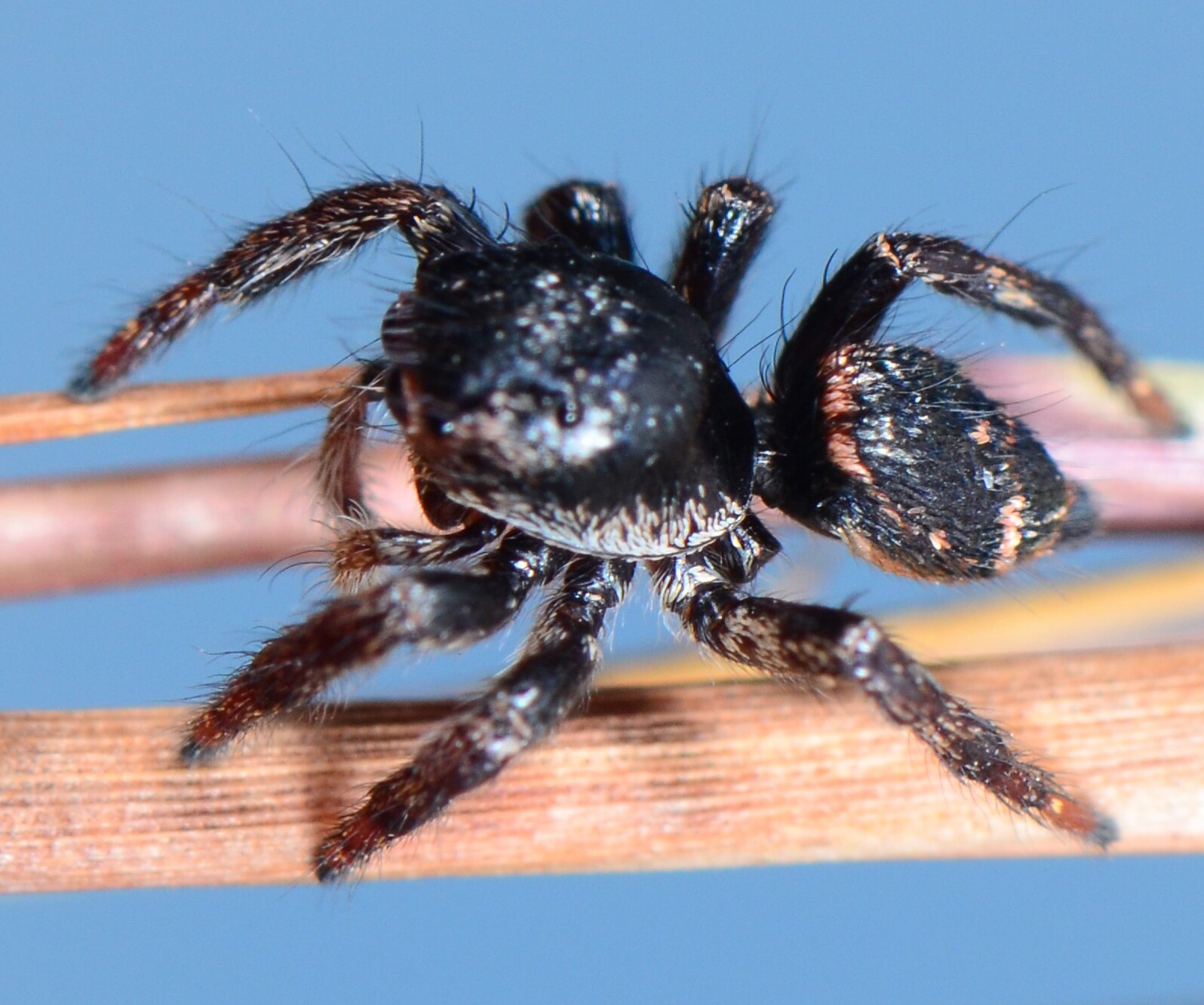
female

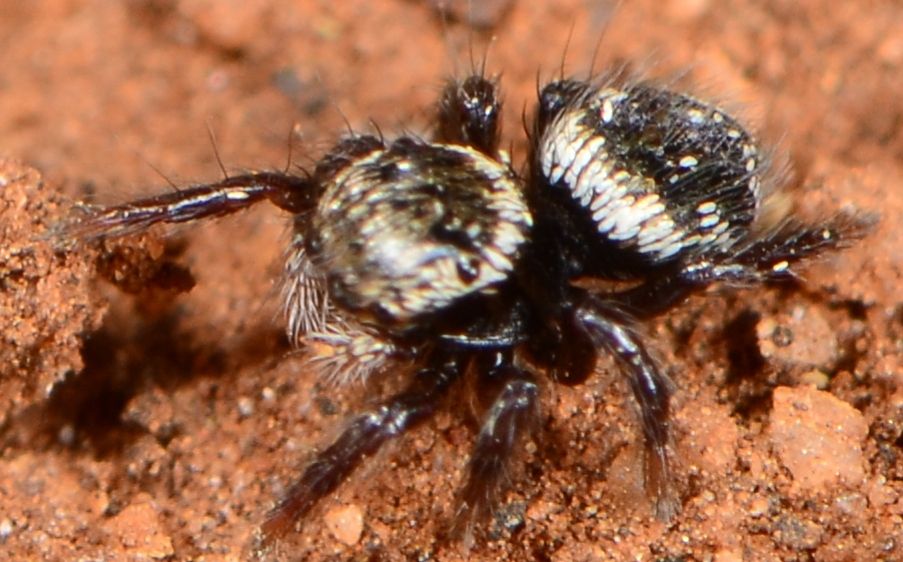
juvenile

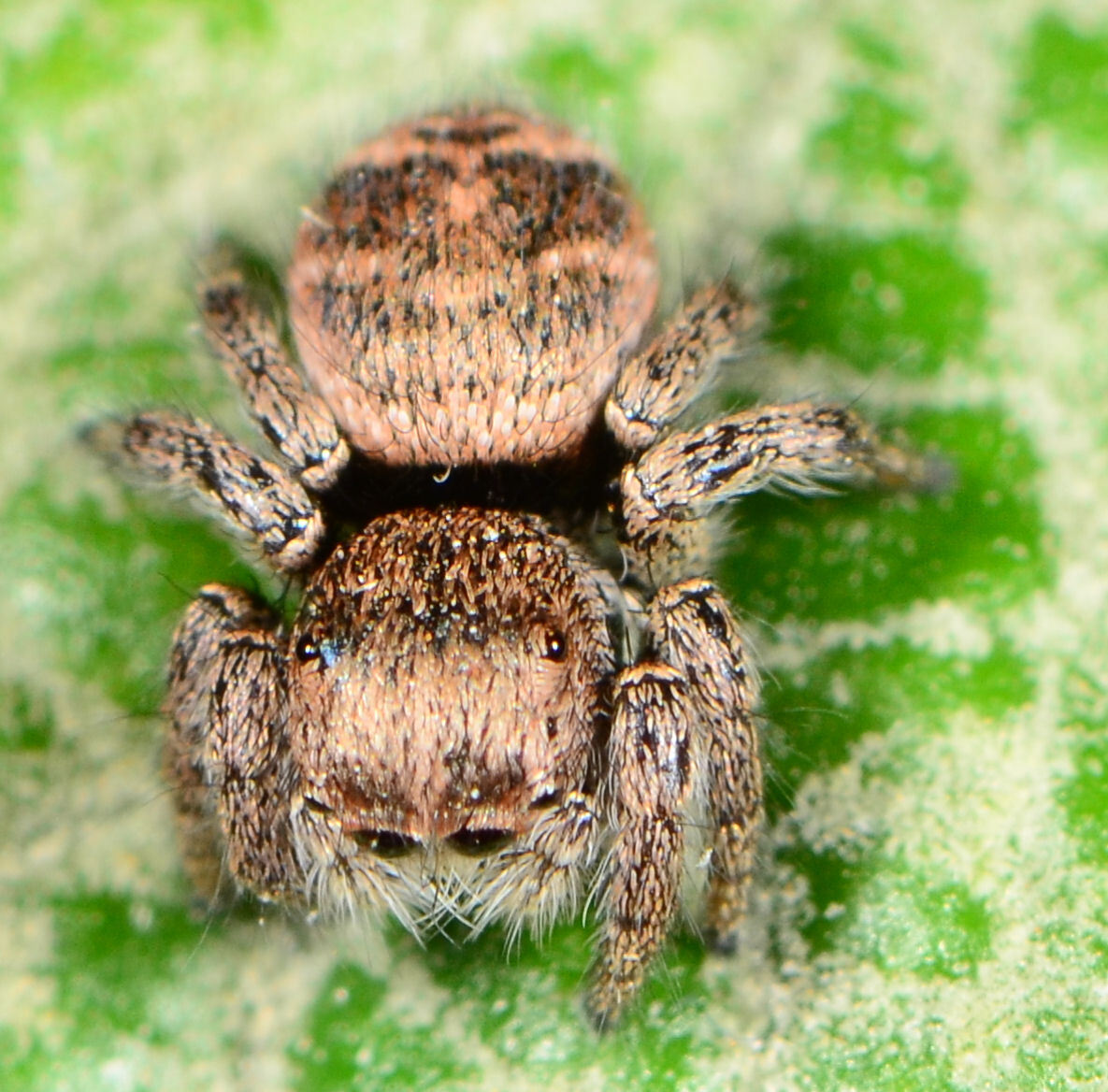
juvenile female

Baryphas ahenus differs from other Baryphas species in the shape of the tibial apophysis, which is relatively short with apical teeth, and the absence of a clearly visible basal lobe on the palpal tegulum. The female is similar to the male but somewhat lighter in colour, with an abdominal pattern featuring white or orange transverse stripes and a central patch. Total length of both female and male ranges from 4.5 to 10.8 mm.

== Taxonomy ==
Baryphas ahenus was originally described by Eugène Simon in 1902 from Zululand. Heliophanus berlandi, described by Lawrence in 1937, was synonymized with B. ahenus in 2024.

== Conservation ==
Baryphas ahenus is listed as Least Concern due to its very wide distribution across four African countries. In South Africa, it is protected in more than 10 protected areas. There are no significant threats to the species.
