= Iranattus principalis =

Scientific classification
- Kingdom: Animalia
- Phylum: Arthropoda
- Subphylum: Chelicerata
- Class: Arachnida
- Order: Araneae
- Infraorder: Araneomorphae
- Family: Salticidae
- Genus: Iranattus
- Species: I. principalis

Binomial name
- Iranattus principalis (Wesołowska, 2000)

Synonyms
- Monomotapa principalis Wesołowska, 2000

Species of spider

Iranattus principalis is an African species of spider in the family Salticidae.

== Distribution ==
Iranattus principalis is distributed across Cameroon, Ivory Coast, Nigeria, South Africa and Zimbabwe.

In South Africa, the species is known from Limpopo.

== Habitat and ecology ==
This species is a free-living wanderer sampled with pitfall traps in the Savanna Biome at altitudes ranging from 605 to 894 m. It is confined to savannah habitats in the Ivory Coast, where it was collected on the branches of shrubs.

== Conservation ==
Iranattus principalis is listed as Least Concern due to its wide geographical range. The species is protected in Blouberg Nature Reserve.

== Taxonomy ==
Iranattus principalis was originally described in 2000 as Monomotapa principalis from Zimbabwe. The species was transferred to Iranattus by Prószyński in 2017.

Iranattus and Monomotapa were previously monotypic genera.
