= Baryphas eupogon =

Scientific classification
- Kingdom: Animalia
- Phylum: Arthropoda
- Subphylum: Chelicerata
- Class: Arachnida
- Order: Araneae
- Infraorder: Araneomorphae
- Family: Salticidae
- Genus: Baryphas
- Species: B. eupogon

Binomial name
- Baryphas eupogon Simon, 1902

Species of spider

Baryphas eupogon is a species of jumping spiders native to São Tomé and Príncipe. The species was named by Eugène Simon in 1902.

The male holotype measures 5 mm.
