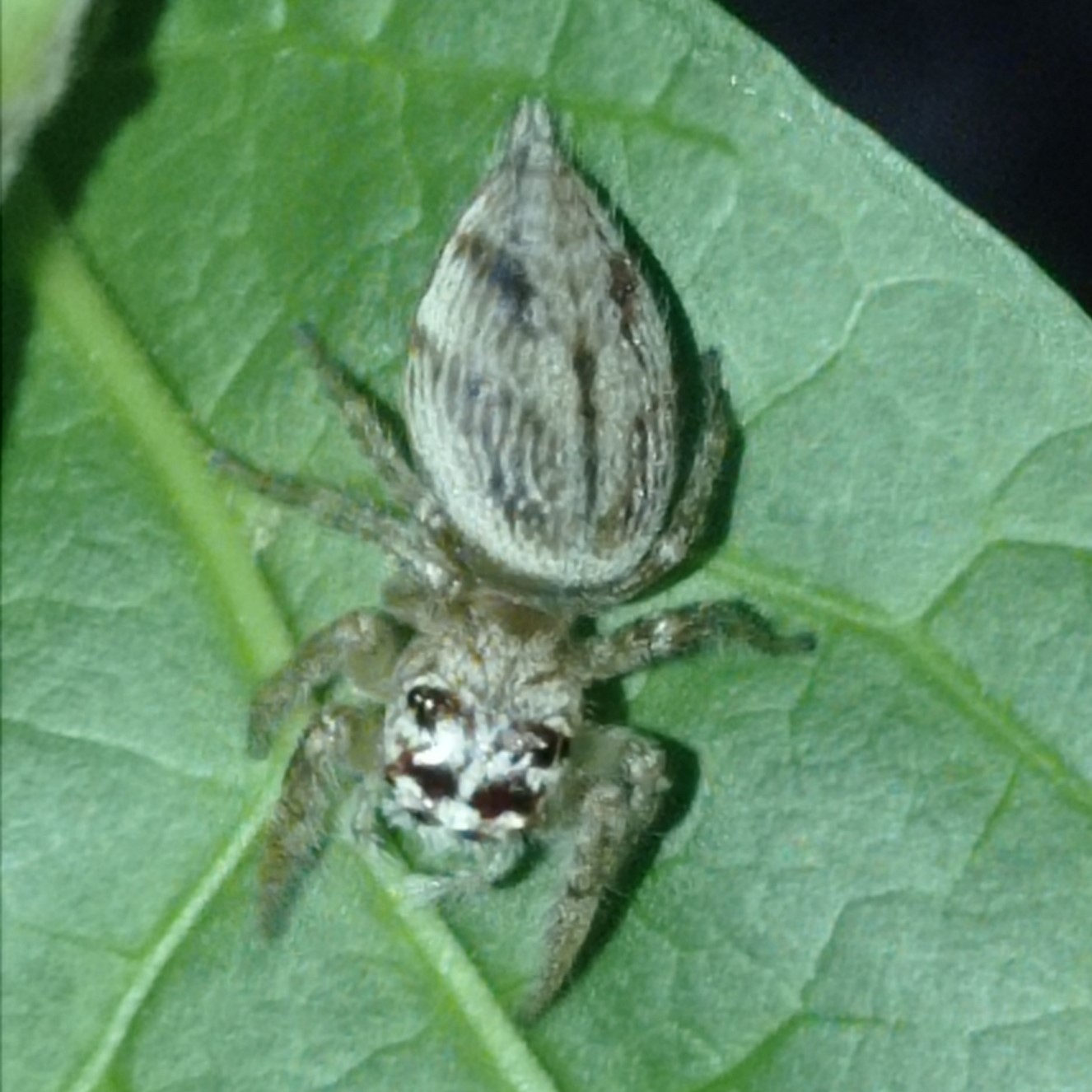
- Artabrus aurantipilosus

Scientific classification
- Kingdom: Animalia
- Phylum: Arthropoda
- Subphylum: Chelicerata
- Class: Arachnida
- Order: Araneae
- Infraorder: Araneomorphae
- Family: Salticidae
- Subfamily: Salticinae
- Genus: Artabrus; Simon, 1902

= Artabrus =

Genus of spiders

Artabrus is a genus of jumping spiders with only two species. The type species, Artabrus erythrocephalus, was described in 1846 by C. L. Koch as Plexippus erythrocephalus and transferred to his new genus Artabrus by Eugène Simon in 1902. It remained the only species in the genus until a second species was described in 2020.

Species of the genus resemble Epeus species in body shape and eye pattern, but have a different genital structure. It is said to be close to the genus Pseudamycus.

== Species ==
As of July 2021, the World Spider Catalog accepted two species:

- Artabrus aurantipilosus Hurni-Cranston & Hill, 2020 – Banda Islands
- Artabrus erythrocephalus (C. L. Koch, 1846) – Java, Singapore
