= Iranattus rectangularis =

Scientific classification
- Kingdom: Animalia
- Phylum: Arthropoda
- Subphylum: Chelicerata
- Class: Arachnida
- Order: Araneae
- Infraorder: Araneomorphae
- Family: Salticidae
- Genus: Iranattus
- Species: I. rectangularis

Binomial name
- Iranattus rectangularis Prószyński, 1992

Species of spider

Iranattus rectangularis is a species of spider in the family Salticidae, found in Iran.
