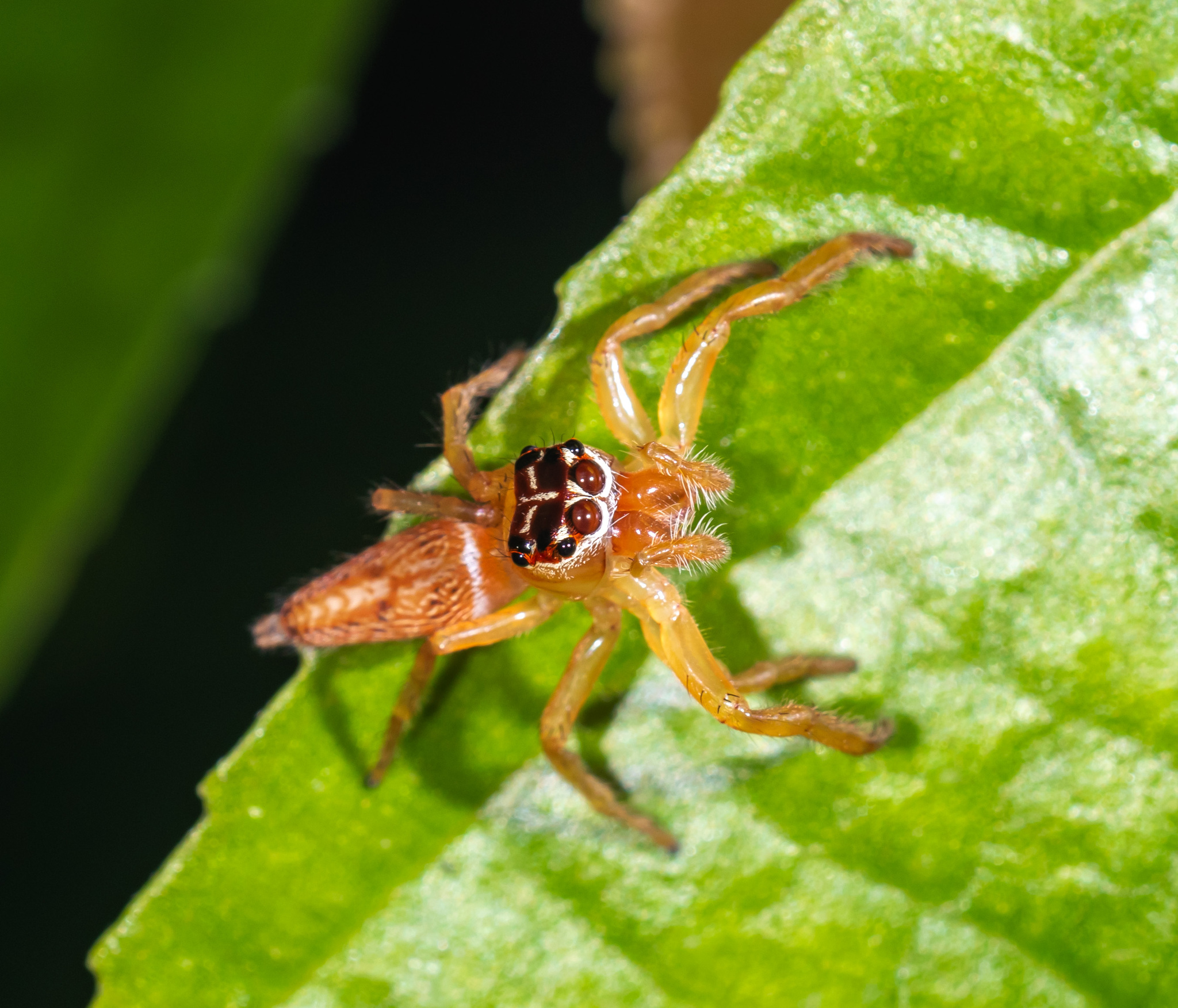
- from Indonesia

Scientific classification
- Kingdom: Animalia
- Phylum: Arthropoda
- Subphylum: Chelicerata
- Class: Arachnida
- Order: Araneae
- Infraorder: Araneomorphae
- Family: Salticidae
- Genus: Artabrus
- Species: A. erythrocephalus

Binomial name
- Artabrus erythrocephalus (C. L. Koch, 1846)

Synonyms
- Plexippus erythrocephalus C. L. Koch, 1846

= Artabrus erythrocephalus =

Species of spider

Artabrus erythrocephalus is a species of spider in the family Salticidae, found in Singapore and Java.
