= Modunda aeneiceps =

Scientific classification
- Kingdom: Animalia
- Phylum: Arthropoda
- Subphylum: Chelicerata
- Class: Arachnida
- Order: Araneae
- Infraorder: Araneomorphae
- Family: Salticidae
- Genus: Modunda
- Species: M. aeneiceps

Binomial name
- Modunda aeneiceps Simon, 1901

Species of spider

Modunda aeneiceps is a species of spider of the genus Modunda. It is found only in China and Sri Lanka.
