= Afrobeata =

Scientific classification
- Kingdom: Animalia
- Phylum: Arthropoda
- Subphylum: Chelicerata
- Class: Arachnida
- Order: Araneae
- Infraorder: Araneomorphae
- Family: Salticidae
- Subfamily: Salticinae
- Genus: Afrobeata; Caporiacco, 1941

Type species
- A. latithorax Caporiacco, 1941

Species
- A. firma Wesolowska & van Harten, 1994 – Yemen (Socotra); A. latithorax Caporiacco, 1941 – Ethiopia; A. magnifica Wesolowska & Russell-Smith, 2000 – Tanzania

Genus of spiders

Afrobeata is a genus of jumping spiders that was first described by Lodovico di Caporiacco in 1941. As of August 2022 it contains only three species, found only in Tanzania, Ethiopia, and on Socotra: A. firma, A. latithorax, and A. magnifica. The name is derived from "Africa" and the genus Beata.
