= Dasycyptus =

Scientific classification
- Kingdom: Animalia
- Phylum: Arthropoda
- Subphylum: Chelicerata
- Class: Arachnida
- Order: Araneae
- Infraorder: Araneomorphae
- Family: Salticidae
- Subfamily: Salticinae
- Genus: Dasycyptus; Simon, 1902

Type species
- D. dimus Simon, 1902

Species
- D. dimus Simon, 1902 – Gabon, Congo; D. dubius Berland & Millot, 1941 – Ivory Coast

Genus of spiders

Dasycyptus is a genus of African jumping spiders that was first described by Eugène Louis Simon in 1902. As of June 2019 it contains only two species, found only in Africa: D. dimus and D. dubius.
