= Taivala =

Scientific classification
- Kingdom: Animalia
- Phylum: Arthropoda
- Subphylum: Chelicerata
- Class: Arachnida
- Order: Araneae
- Infraorder: Araneomorphae
- Family: Salticidae
- Genus: Taivala; Peckham & Peckham, 1907
- Species: T. invisitata

Binomial name
- Taivala invisitata Peckham & Peckham, 1907

Genus of spiders

Taivala is a monotypic genus of jumping spiders containing the single species, Taivala invisitata. It was first described by G. Peckham & Elizabeth Peckham in 1907, and is found in Sarawak, Borneo. Only females have been found, but it is thought to be closely related to Pseudamycus. A female epigyne was drawn by Proszynski in 1984.
