= Iranattus =

Scientific classification
- Kingdom: Animalia
- Phylum: Arthropoda
- Subphylum: Chelicerata
- Class: Arachnida
- Order: Araneae
- Infraorder: Araneomorphae
- Family: Salticidae
- Subfamily: Salticinae
- Genus: Iranattus; Prószyński, 1992

Genus of spiders

Iranattus is a genus of jumping spiders with two described species.

== Distribution ==
While I. rectangularis, described in 1992, is found in Iran and India, the African species I. principalis was later found to belong to the same genus.

== Life style ==
Iranattus are ground-dwellers. One species was sampled from flood debris on a riverbank.

== Description ==
Iranattus are small spiders, measuring 4–5 mm. The carapace is rounded, very wide and relatively high, especially posteriorly. The posterior eyes are situated on small tubercles. The carapace is dark brown, with fawsetae on slopes and brown bristles near eyes. The anterior eyes are surrounded by orange-fawn scales. The clypeus has long fawn setae. The chelicerae are brown. The maxillae are brown with pale tips. The labium and sternum are brown.

The abdomen is elongated and distinctly narrower than the carapace. It is blackish with numerous short dense grey hairs. The ventral surface is dark and the spinnerets are greyish.

The legs are brown, with the distal ends of their segments darker. The femora III are almost twice as long as the other femora.

== Name ==
The genus name is a combination of Iran and the common ending for salticid genera -attus.

== Species ==
As of October 2025, this genus includes two species:

- Iranattus principalis (Wesołowska, 2000) – Ivory Coast, Nigeria, Cameroon, Zimbabwe, South Africa
- Iranattus rectangularis Prószyński, 1992 – Iran, India (type species)
