= Encymachus =

Scientific classification
- Kingdom: Animalia
- Phylum: Arthropoda
- Subphylum: Chelicerata
- Class: Arachnida
- Order: Araneae
- Infraorder: Araneomorphae
- Family: Salticidae
- Subfamily: Salticinae
- Genus: Encymachus; Simon, 1902

Type species
- E. livingstonei Simon, 1902

Species
- E. hesperus Lawrence, 1927 – Namibia; E. livingstonei Simon, 1902 – Africa

Genus of spiders

Encymachus is a genus of African jumping spiders that was first described by Eugène Louis Simon in 1902. As of June 2019 it contains only two species, found only in Africa: E. hesperus and E. livingstonei.
