= Yaginumaella =

Scientific classification
- Kingdom: Animalia
- Phylum: Arthropoda
- Subphylum: Chelicerata
- Class: Arachnida
- Order: Araneae
- Infraorder: Araneomorphae
- Family: Salticidae
- Subfamily: Salticinae
- Genus: Yaginumaella; Prószyński, 1979

Type species
- Y. ususudi (Yaginuma, 1972)

Species
- 13, see text

Genus of spiders

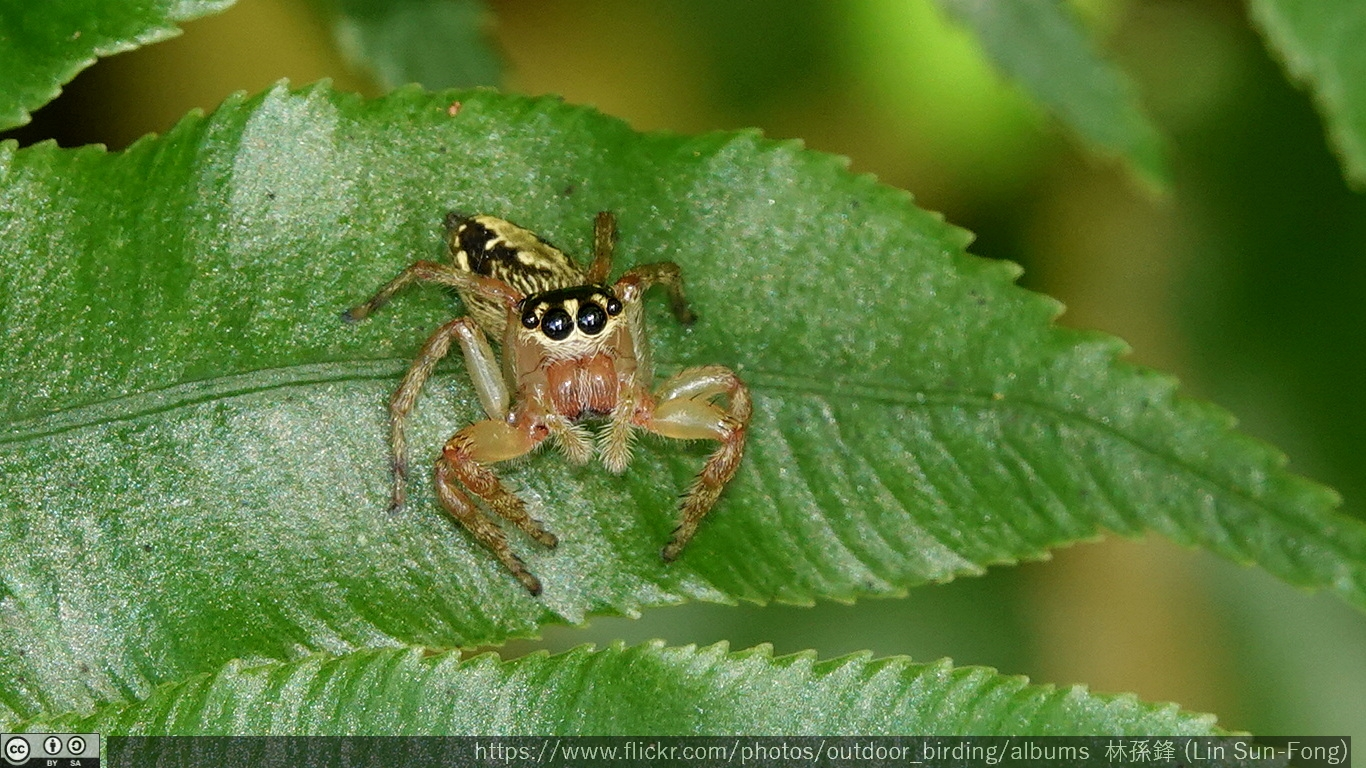
Yaginumaella lobata

Yaginumaella is a genus of Asian jumping spiders that was first described by Jerzy Prószyński in 1979.

== Species ==
As of September 2022 it contains thirteen species, found in Asia:

- Yaginumaella aishwaryi Sunil Jose, 2013 – India
- Yaginumaella dali Shao, Li & Yang, 2014 – China
- Yaginumaella flexa Song & Chai, 1992 – China
- Yaginumaella hyogoensis Bohdanowicz & Prószyński, 1987 – Japan
- Yaginumaella lobata Peng, Tso & Li, 2002 – Taiwan
- Yaginumaella longnanensis Yang, Tang & Kim, 1997 – China
- Yaginumaella lushuiensis Liu, Yang & Peng, 2016 – China
- Yaginumaella medvedevi Prószyński, 1979 – Russia, China, Korea
- Yaginumaella orthomargina Shao, Li & Yang, 2014 – China
- Yaginumaella striatipes (Grube, 1861) – Russia, Japan
- Yaginumaella ususudi (Yaginuma, 1972) (type) – Japan
- Yaginumaella variformis Song & Chai, 1992 – China
- Yaginumaella wenxianensis (Tang & Yang, 1995) – China
