= Modunda =

Scientific classification
- Kingdom: Animalia
- Phylum: Arthropoda
- Subphylum: Chelicerata
- Class: Arachnida
- Order: Araneae
- Infraorder: Araneomorphae
- Family: Salticidae
- Subfamily: Salticinae
- Genus: Modunda; Simon, 1901

Type species
- M. staintoni (O. Pickard-Cambridge, 1872)

Species
- M. aeneiceps Simon, 1901; M. orientalis Dönitz & Strand, 1906; M. staintoni (O. Pickard-Cambridge, 1872)

Genus of spiders

Modunda is a genus of jumping spiders that was first described by Eugène Louis Simon in 1901.

== Distribution ==
The three described species are found in Asia and South Africa.

== Species ==
As of October 2025, this genus includes three species:

- Modunda aeneiceps Simon, 1901 – Sri Lanka, China
- Modunda orientalis Dönitz & Strand, 1906 – Japan
- Modunda staintoni (O. Pickard-Cambridge, 1872) – South Africa to India (type species)
