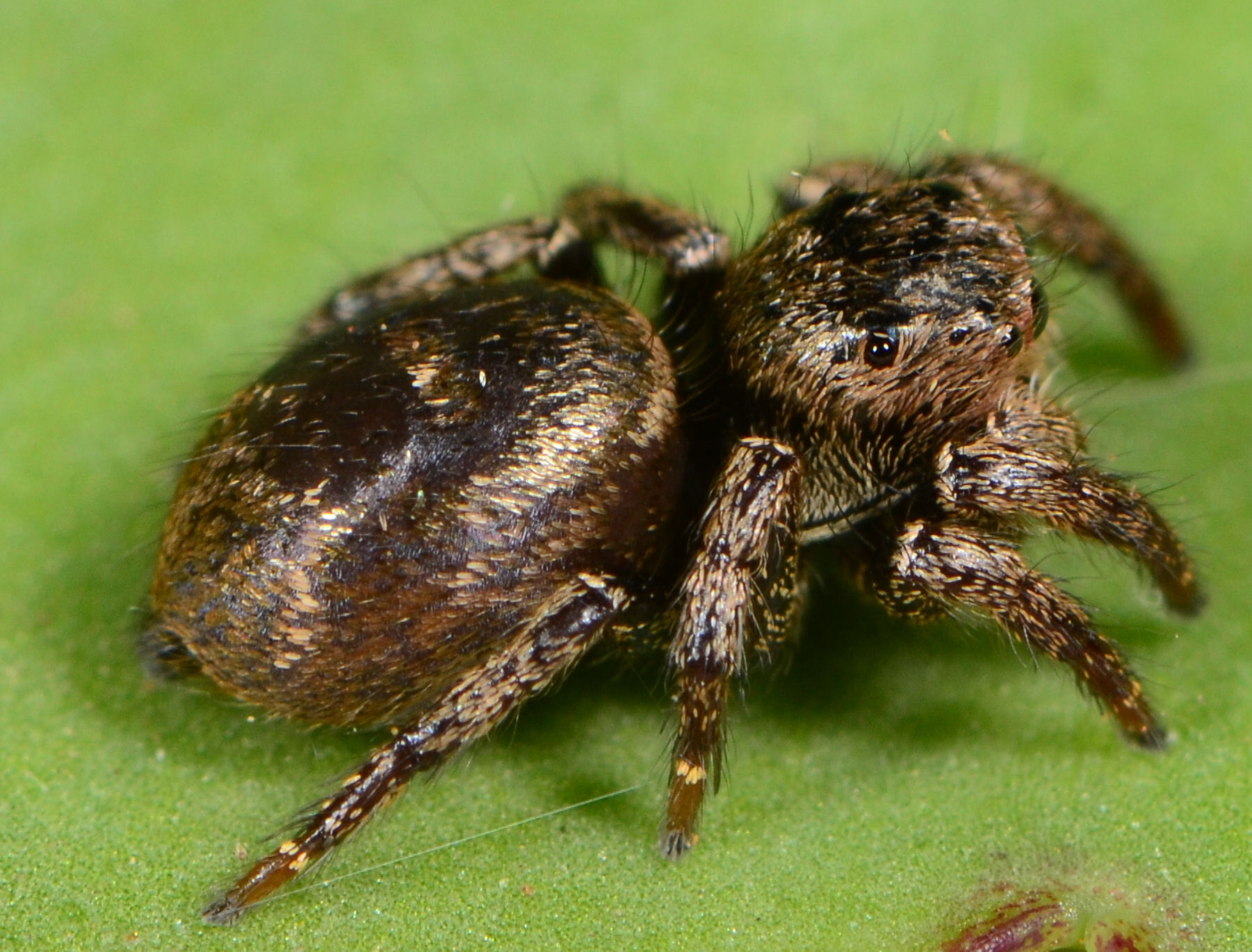
- female B. ahenus
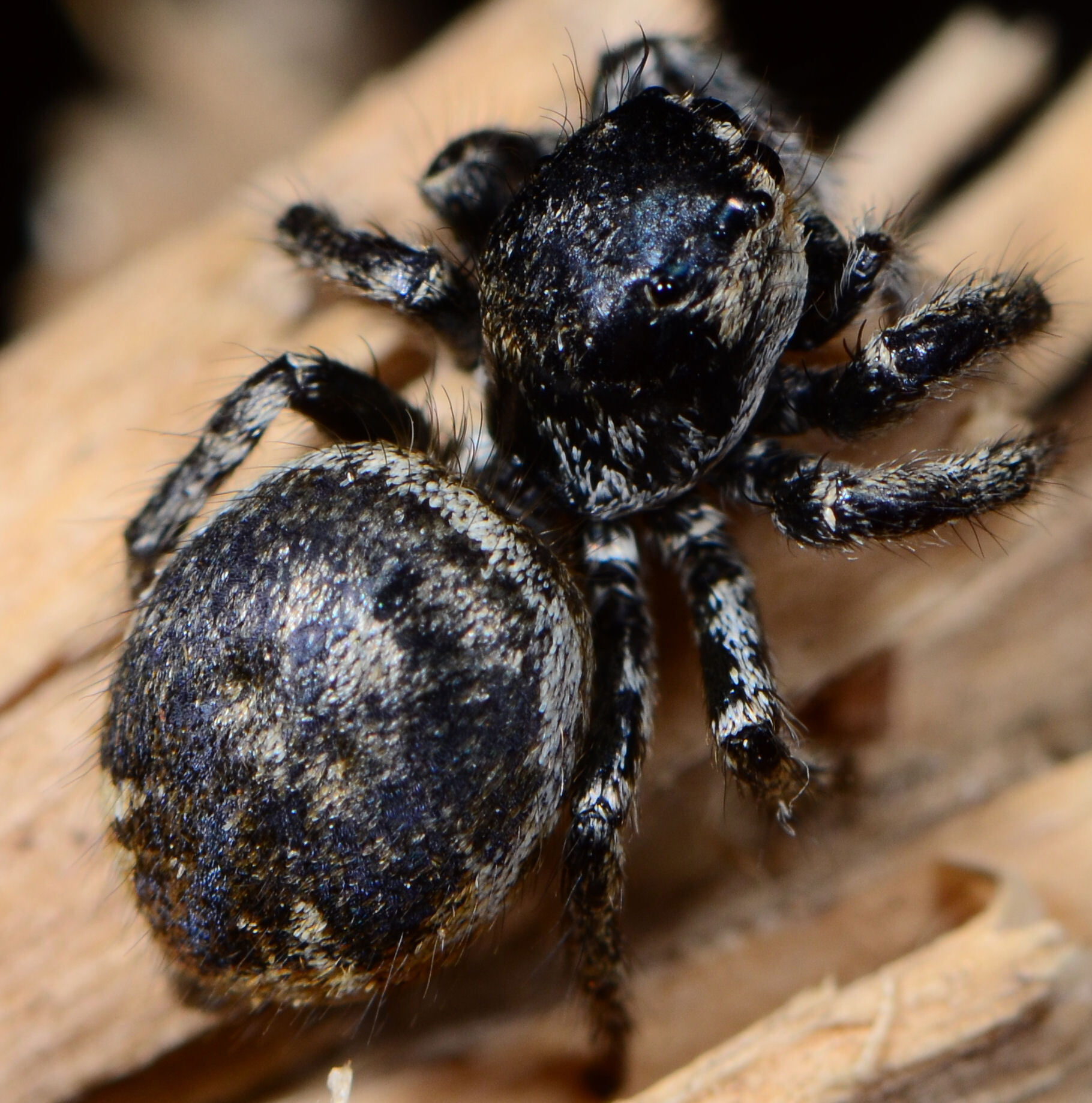
- male B. ahenus

Scientific classification
- Kingdom: Animalia
- Phylum: Arthropoda
- Subphylum: Chelicerata
- Class: Arachnida
- Order: Araneae
- Infraorder: Araneomorphae
- Family: Salticidae
- Subfamily: Salticinae
- Genus: Baryphas; Simon, 1902

Type species
- B. ahenus Simon, 1902

Species
- 6, see text

Synonyms
- Polemus Simon, 1902

= Baryphas =

Genus of spiders

Baryphas is a genus of African jumping spiders that was first described by Eugène Simon in 1902.

== Distribution ==
Spiders in this genus are only found in Africa, with some species endemic to southern Africa, while others occur in East Africa or West Africa. One species is endemic to the island country São Tomé and Príncipe.

== Life style ==
Spiders in this genus are free-living plant-dwellers.

== Description ==
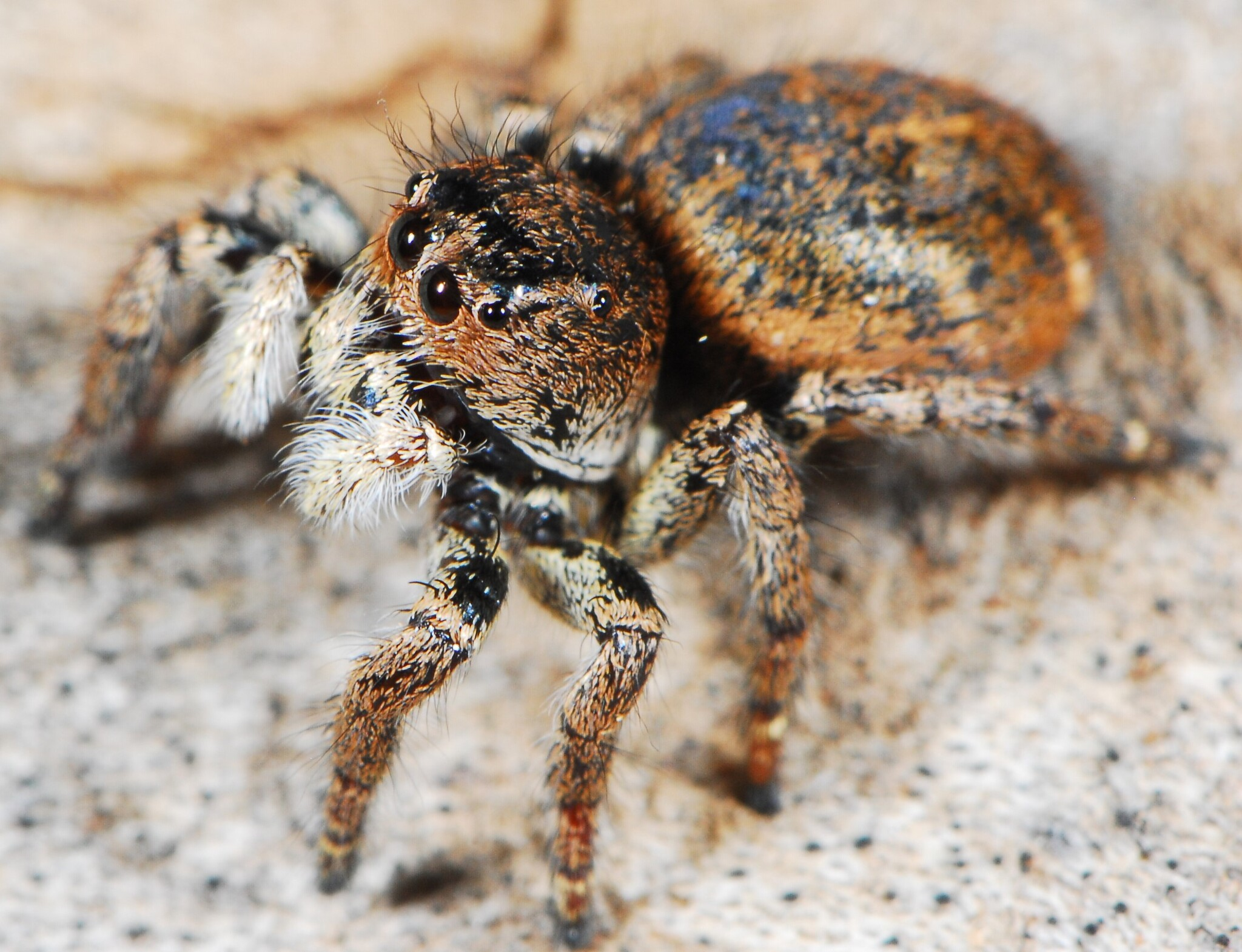
adult female

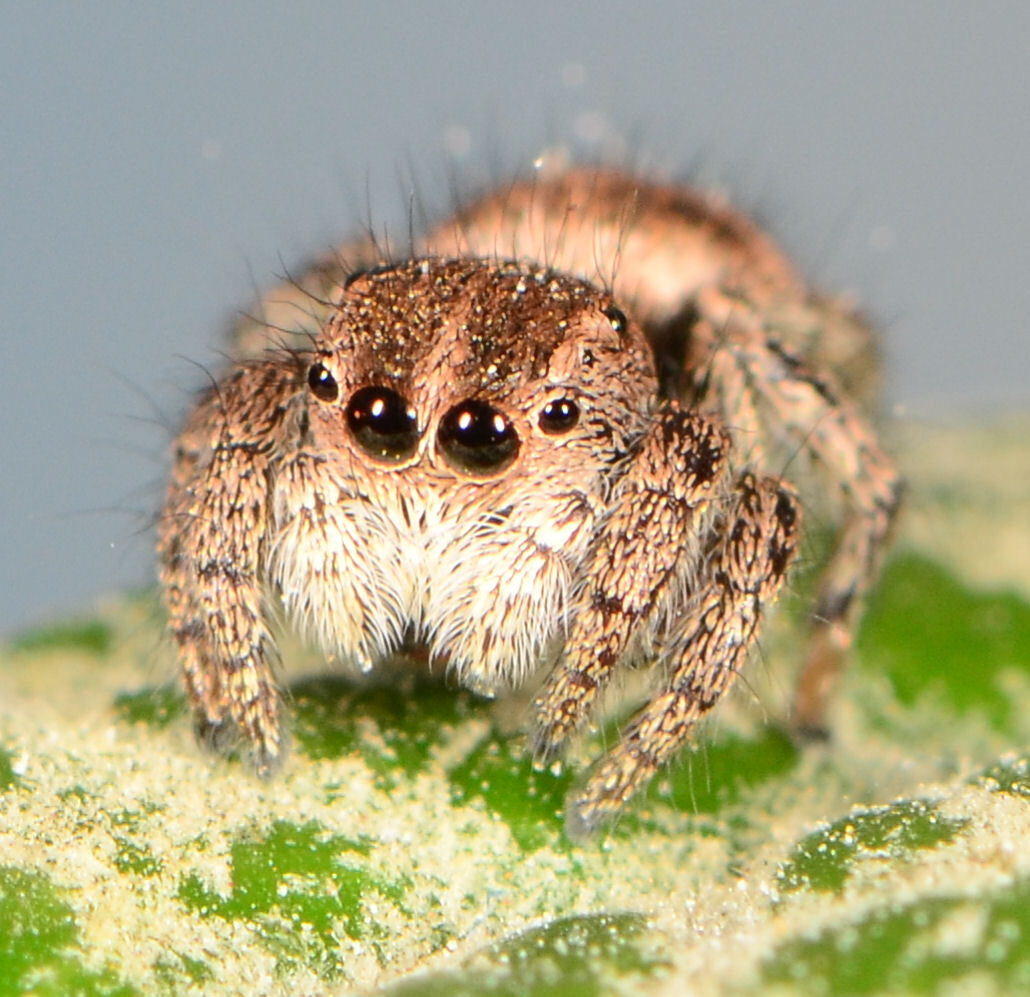
juvenile female

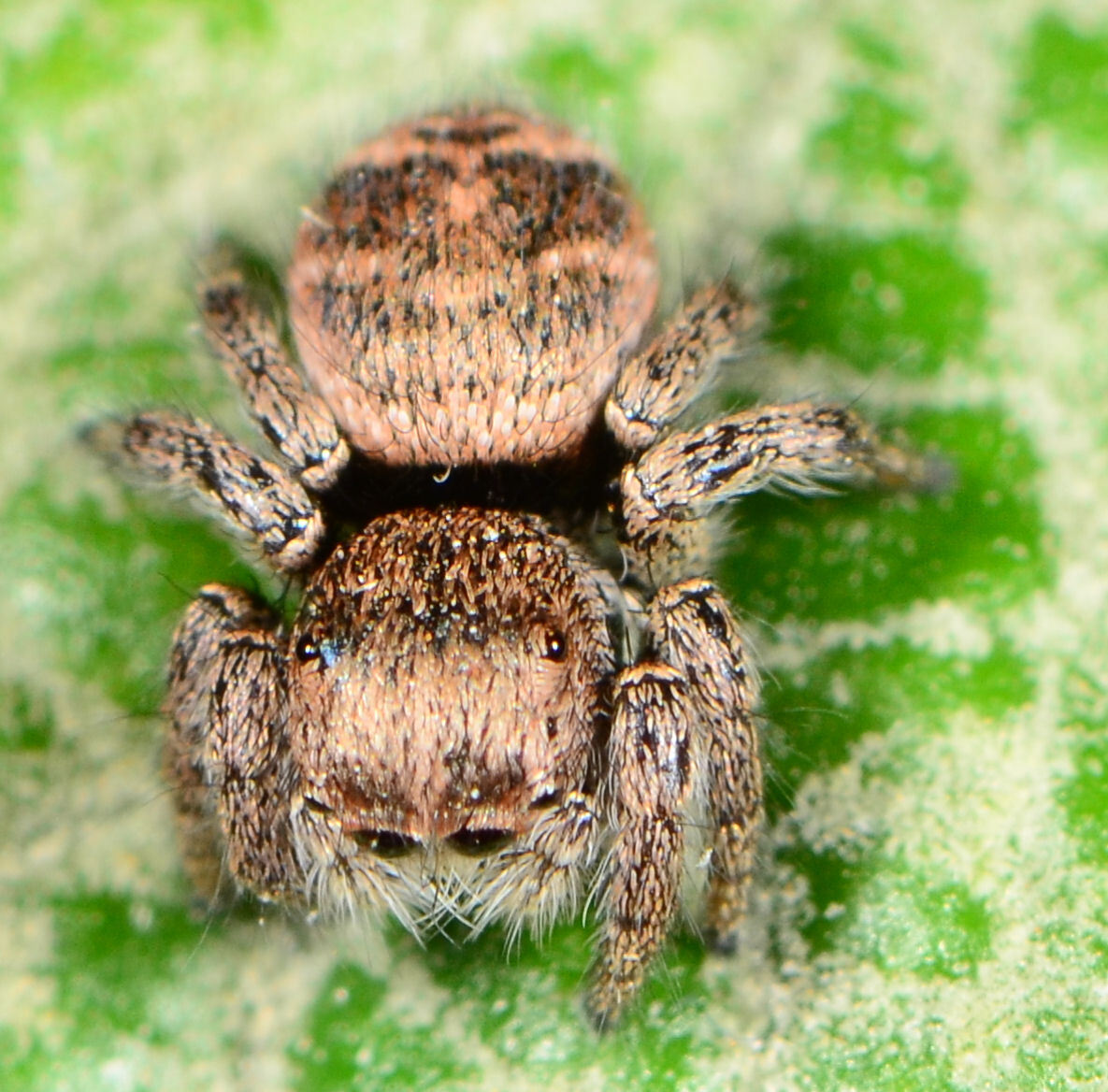
juvenile female

Size ranges from 4.5 to 10.8 mm in total length for both female and male. Baryphas ahenus differs from other Baryphas species in the shape of the tibial apophysis, which is relatively short with apical teeth, and the absence of a clearly visible basal lobe on the palpal tegulum.

Male carapace high, red-brown to dark brown, covered with dark brown hairs and whitish-transparent iridescent scales. Clypeus and cheeks brown to yellow-brown with one row of brown bristles, covered with whitish-transparent scales. Chelicerae large and robust with small fangs. Sternum brown.

Abdomen dorsum brown, covered with dense long brown hairs, with pattern of white or orange scales featuring a small patch in centre of abdomen and two transverse short stripes on lateral sides. Ventrally yellow-brown with brown hairs and whitish-transparent scales.

Legs dark brown. Female are same as male, but sometimes lighter in colour, with abdominal pattern featuring white or orange transverse stripes and central patch.

== Taxonomy ==
South African species were discussed by Haddad & Vickers in 2024.

== Species ==
As of October 2025, this genus includes six species:

- Baryphas ahenus Simon, 1902 – Tanzania, Zimbawe, Mozambique, South Africa (type species)
- Baryphas eupogon Simon, 1902 – São Tomé and Príncipe
- Baryphas galeatus (Simon, 1902) – Sierra Leone
- Baryphas jullieni Simon, 1902 – Guinea, Sierra Leone, Liberia, Ivory Coast, Ghana, Nigeria
- Baryphas parvulus Haddad & Vickers, 2024 – South Africa
- Baryphas scintillans Berland & Millot, 1941 – Guinea, Ivory Coast, Uganda
