= Pseudoplexippus =

Scientific classification
- Kingdom: Animalia
- Phylum: Arthropoda
- Subphylum: Chelicerata
- Class: Arachnida
- Order: Araneae
- Infraorder: Araneomorphae
- Family: Salticidae
- Genus: Pseudoplexippus; Caporiacco, 1947
- Species: P. unicus

Binomial name
- Pseudoplexippus unicus Caporiacco, 1947

Genus of spiders

Pseudoplexippus is a monotypic genus of Tanzanian jumping spiders containing the single species, Pseudoplexippus unicus. It was first described by Lodovico di Caporiacco in 1947, and is found only in Tanzania. The name is a combination of the Ancient Greek "pseudo-" (ψευδής), meaning "false", and the salticid genus Plexippus.
