= Pellolessertia =

Scientific classification
- Kingdom: Animalia
- Phylum: Arthropoda
- Subphylum: Chelicerata
- Class: Arachnida
- Order: Araneae
- Infraorder: Araneomorphae
- Family: Salticidae
- Genus: Pellolessertia; Strand, 1929
- Species: P. castanea

Binomial name
- Pellolessertia castanea (Lessert, 1927)

Genus of spiders

Pellolessertia is a monotypic genus of African jumping spiders containing the single species, Pellolessertia castanea. It was first described in 1927, and is only found in Africa. Dippenaar-Schoeman & Jocqué gave the distribution range as Zad're to Ethiopia.

The name is a combination of the salticid genus Pellenes, due to its resemblance it and several other genera in the subfamily Pelleninae, and the arachnologist Lessert. It was first discovered in Avakubi, Democratic Republic of the Congo, and given the name Avakubia. In 1929, the name was changed to "Pellolessertia" because its previous name was already being used for a gastropod subgenus in Streptaxidae.
