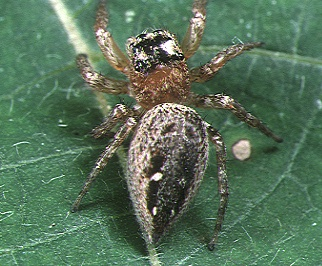
- Female Burmattus pococki

Scientific classification
- Kingdom: Animalia
- Phylum: Arthropoda
- Subphylum: Chelicerata
- Class: Arachnida
- Order: Araneae
- Infraorder: Araneomorphae
- Family: Salticidae
- Subfamily: Salticinae
- Genus: Burmattus; Prószyński, 1992

Type species
- B. pococki (Thorell, 1895)

Species
- 4, see text

= Burmattus =

Genus of spiders

Burmattus is a genus of Asian jumping spiders that was first described by Jerzy Prószyński in 1992. The name is derived from "Burma", and "-attus", a common suffix for salticid genera.

== Species ==
As of June 2019 it contains four species, found only in Asia:

- Burmattus albopunctatus (Thorell, 1895) – Myanmar
- Burmattus pachytibialis Prószyński & Deeleman-Reinhold, 2010 – Indonesia (Sumbawa)
- Burmattus pococki (Thorell, 1895) (type) – Myanmar, Thailand, Indonesia, Vietnam, China, Japan, Taiwan
- Burmattus sinicus Prószyński, 1992 – China
