= Paraneaetha =

Scientific classification
- Kingdom: Animalia
- Phylum: Arthropoda
- Subphylum: Chelicerata
- Class: Arachnida
- Order: Araneae
- Infraorder: Araneomorphae
- Family: Salticidae
- Genus: Paraneaetha; Denis, 1947
- Species: P. diversa

Binomial name
- Paraneaetha diversa Denis, 1947

Genus of spiders

Paraneaetha is a monotypic genus of Egyptian jumping spiders containing the single species, Paraneaetha diversa. It was first described by J. Denis in 1947, and is only found in Egypt. The name is a combination of the Ancient Greek "para" (παρά), meaning "alongside", and the salticid genus Neaetha.
