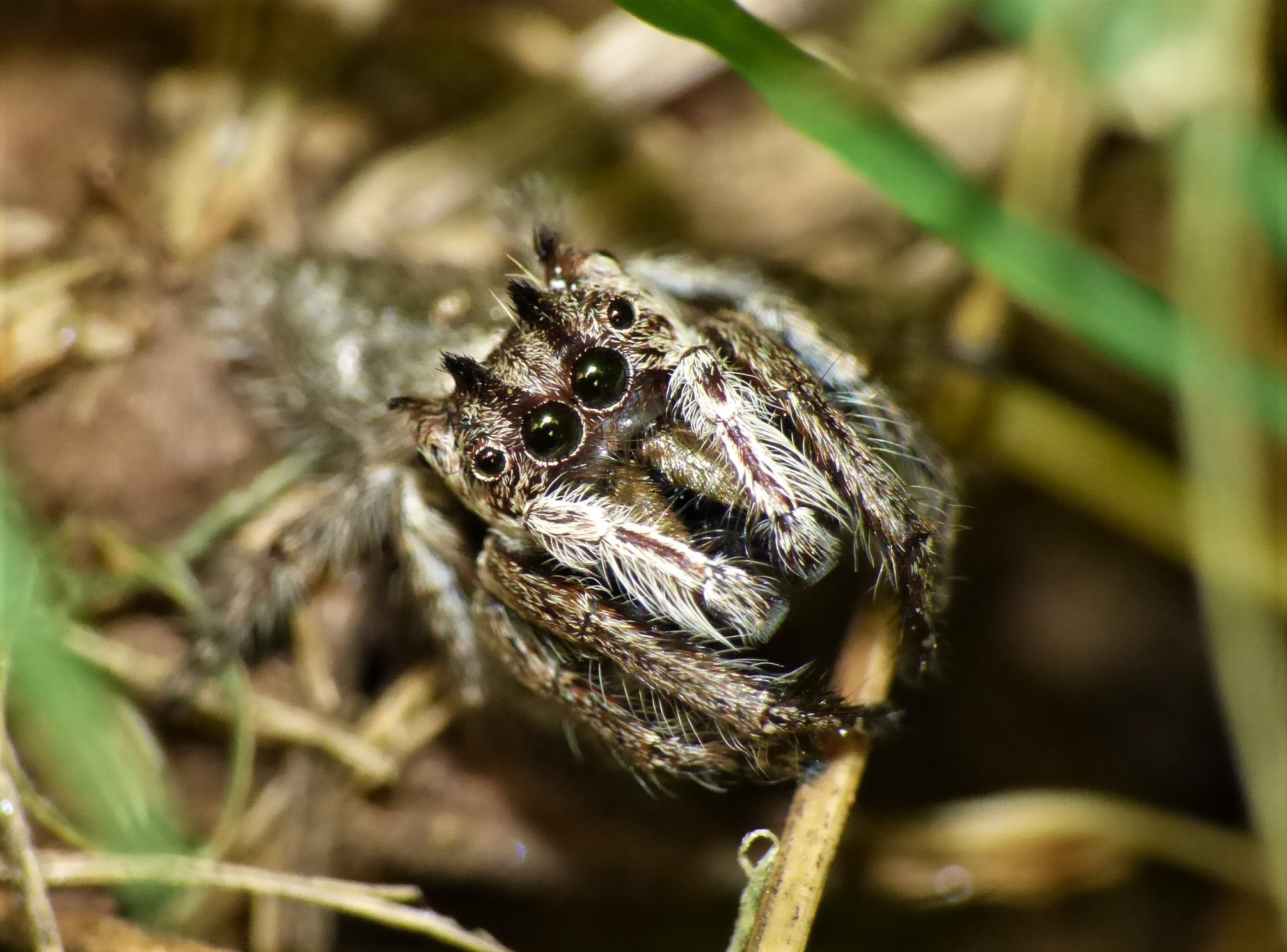
- Vailimia cf. ajmerensis from Rajasthan, India

Scientific classification
- Kingdom: Animalia
- Phylum: Arthropoda
- Subphylum: Chelicerata
- Class: Arachnida
- Order: Araneae
- Infraorder: Araneomorphae
- Family: Salticidae
- Subfamily: Salticinae
- Genus: Vailimia; Kammerer, 2006

Type species
- Vailima masinei Peckham & Peckham, 1907

Species
- 4, see text

= Vailimia =

Genus of spiders

Vailimia is a genus of Asian jumping spiders. The type species was described in 1907 from a single male about 6 millimetres (0.24 in) long. It was originally thought to be close to Harmochirus, but the male pedipalp, chelicera, and cephalothorax drawn by Proszynski in 1984, and information gained from later collected specimens indicates otherwise. Subsequently, five more species have been identified. It may be a synonym for Pancorius.

== Name ==
The genus was originally named Vailima after the name of the last residence of Robert Louis Stevenson and the village where it is situated. The genus name Vailima was erected by Peckham & Peckham in 1907. However, the name was misspelled Vailimia by Prószyński in 2003. The alternate name Vailimia in 2006 was suggested by C. F. Kammerer as the name was found to be preoccupied by the fish genus Vailima.

== Species ==
Most species are found in Borneo, though Vailimia longitibia was first identified in China, and Vailimia ajmerensis and Vailimia jharbari have been described from India. As of June 2021 it contains six species, all found in Asia:

- Vailimia ajmerensis Caleb & Jangid, 2020 – India
- Vailimia bakoensis Prószyński & Deeleman-Reinhold, 2013 – Borneo
- Vailimia jharbari Basumatary, Caleb & Das, 2020 – India

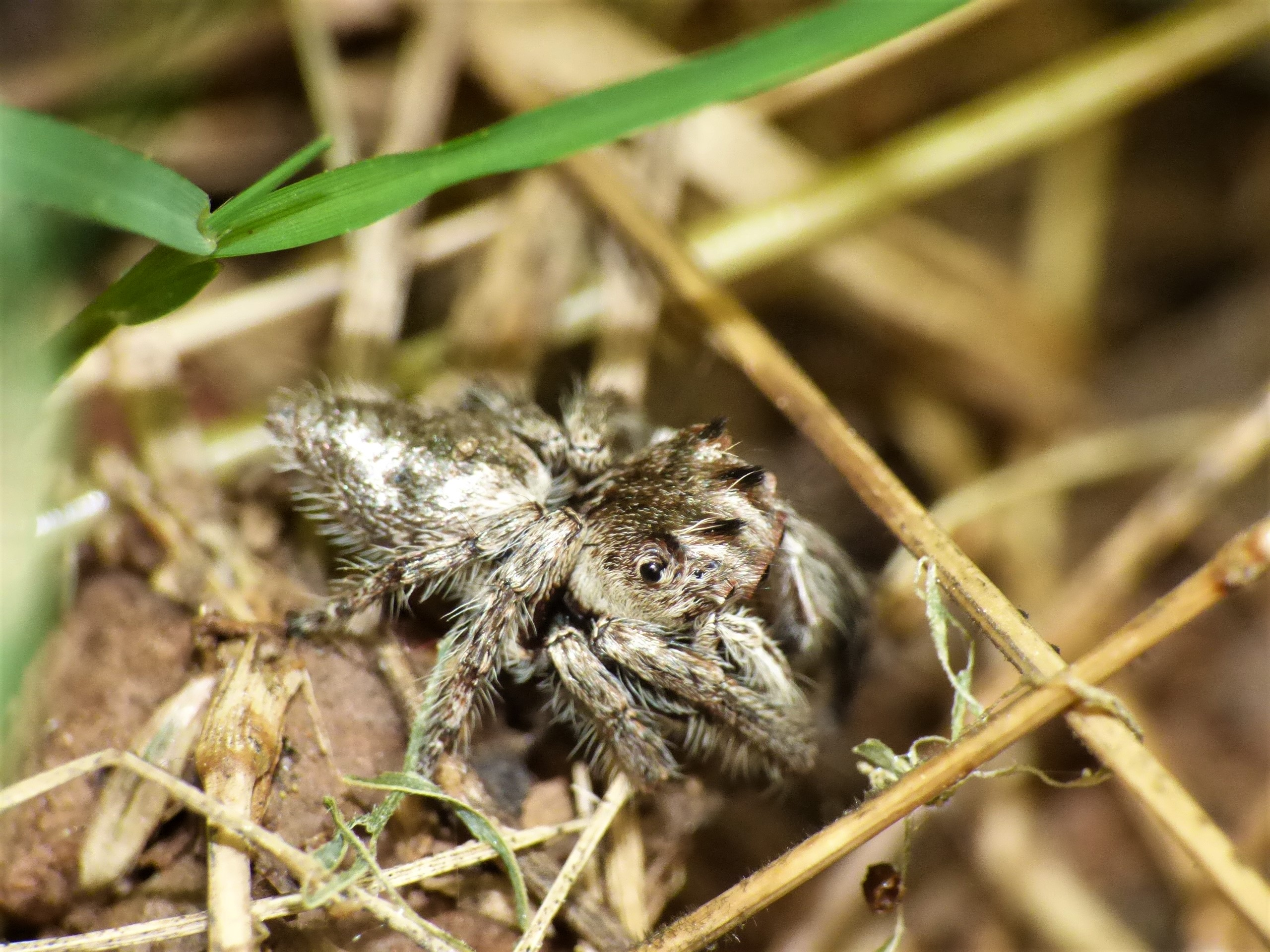
Vailimia sp. (Udaipur, Rajasthan, India)

- Vailimia jianyuae Prószyński & Deeleman-Reinhold, 2013 – Borneo
- Vailimia longitibia Guo, Zhang & Zhu, 2011 – China
- Vailimia masinei (Peckham & Peckham, 1907) (type) – Borneo
