= Anarrhotus =

Scientific classification
- Kingdom: Animalia
- Phylum: Arthropoda
- Subphylum: Chelicerata
- Class: Arachnida
- Order: Araneae
- Infraorder: Araneomorphae
- Family: Salticidae
- Genus: Anarrhotus; Simon, 1902
- Species: A. fossulatus

Binomial name
- Anarrhotus fossulatus Simon, 1902

Genus of spiders

Anarrhotus is a genus of jumping spiders. The only described species Anarrhotus fossulatus is endemic to Malaysia. It is one of several monotypic genera from Southeast Asia where, despite their first description dating back more than a hundred years, there are no habitat details, although genital and sometimes other drawings are now available for several of them. Anarrhotus is only known from a single male specimen, the pedipalp of which was drawn by Proszynski (1984). The original describer Eugène Simon put the genus close to Pancorius. The male is 6 mm long.

Plexippoides nishitakensis (Strand, 1907) was originally put in this genus, but transferred by Proszynski in 1984.
