= Paraplexippus =

Scientific classification
- Kingdom: Animalia
- Phylum: Arthropoda
- Subphylum: Chelicerata
- Class: Arachnida
- Order: Araneae
- Infraorder: Araneomorphae
- Family: Salticidae
- Subfamily: Salticinae
- Genus: Paraplexippus; Franganillo, 1930

Type species
- P. sexsignatus Franganillo, 1930

Species
- P. quadrisignatus Franganillo, 1930 – Cuba; P. sexsignatus Franganillo, 1930 – Cuba

Genus of spiders

Paraplexippus is a genus of Caribbean jumping spiders that was first described by P. Franganillo B. in 1930. As of August 2019 it contains only two species, found only on the Greater Antilles: P. quadrisignatus and P. sexsignatus. The name is a combination of the Ancient Greek "para" (παρά), meaning "alongside", and the salticid genus Plexippus.
