= Pseudamycus =

Scientific classification
- Kingdom: Animalia
- Phylum: Arthropoda
- Subphylum: Chelicerata
- Class: Arachnida
- Order: Araneae
- Infraorder: Araneomorphae
- Family: Salticidae
- Subfamily: Salticinae
- Genus: Pseudamycus; Simon, 1885

Type species
- Amycus albo-maculatus Hasselt, 1882

Species
- See text.

Genus of spiders

Pseudamycus is a spider genus of the jumping spider family, Salticidae. The monotypic genus Taivala is thought to be closely related.

== Appearance ==
These jumping spiders are light or colorful, sometimes iridescent. The cephalothorax is high, with steep sides of the thorax. The eyes protrude from the head, located within an orange-brown eye field. The rest of the carapace is greyish-orange, the abdomen light grey-brown with dots and light and dark streaks on the sides. The first pair of legs are dark brown with yellow tarsi, the other three pairs are reddish yellow and spiny.

== Habits ==
They live on shrubs and other, mostly broad leaved plants, for example ginger.

== Distribution ==
The ten species are found in Southeast Asia, from India to New Britain (New Guinea).

== Name ==
The genus is combined of Greek pseudo "false" and the salticid genus name Amycus.

== Species ==
- Pseudamycus albomaculatus (Hasselt, 1882) – Malaysia to Java
- Pseudamycus amabilis Peckham & Peckham, 1907 – Borneo
- Pseudamycus bhutani Zabka, 1990 – Bhutan
- Pseudamycus canescens Simon, 1899 – Sumatra
- Pseudamycus evarchanus Strand, 1915 – New Britain
- Pseudamycus flavopubescens Simon, 1899 – Sumatra
- Pseudamycus hasselti Zabka, 1985 – Vietnam
- Pseudamycus himalaya (Tikader, 1967) – India
- Pseudamycus sylvestris Peckham & Peckham, 1907 – Borneo
- Pseudamycus validus (Thorell, 1877) – Sulawesi
