= Sibianor kenyaensis =

Scientific classification
- Kingdom: Animalia
- Phylum: Arthropoda
- Subphylum: Chelicerata
- Class: Arachnida
- Order: Araneae
- Infraorder: Araneomorphae
- Family: Salticidae
- Genus: Sibianor
- Species: S. kenyaensis

Binomial name
- Sibianor kenyaensis Logunov, 2001

Species of jumping spider

Sibianor kenyaensis is a jumping spider species that lives near the Okavango River in Botswana and in the coastal regions near Kilifi in Kenya. It is a member of the genus Sibianor and has a distinctive a large scutum that covers its abdomen. A small spider, it is typically 2.42 mm (0.10 in) in length, generally brown on both its top and undersides. Its front pair of legs are also brown, while the rest of its legs are yellow. It also has yellowish-brown sensory appendages, called pedipalps, that hold the male spider's copulatory organs. These include a large projection, or apophysis, on its palpal tibia, which helps distinguish the spider from others in the genus. Although the male was first described in 2001, the female has yet to be described and so the species allocation to the genus is tentative.

== Taxonomy and etymology ==
Sibianor kenyaensis is a species of jumping spider, a member of the family Salticidae. It was first described by the arachnologist Dmitri V. Logunov in 2001 and allocated it to the genus Sibianor. This is a tentative allocation as only the male has been described and the female is needed to decide whether it should instead be a member of the genus Microbianor. Phylogenetic analysis has confirmed that both genera are closely related to both Bianor. In 2017, Jerzy Prószyński designated them members of a group of genera named Harmochirines, named after the genus Harmochirus. The harmochirines, along with a group of species known as pellenines, are members of the subtribe Harmochirina. According to Wayne Maddison, this is part of the tribe Plexippini. The species' generic name is derived from Bianor. Its specific name reflects the place where it was first found.

== Description ==
Sibianor spiders are small with little sexual dimorphism. Sibianor kenyaensis is particularly small, similar to the related Sibianor victoriae. The male has a carapace, the hard upper part of the forward section of the spider, is typically 1.09 mm (0.04 in) long and 1.03 mm (0.04 in) wide. The whole front section, including the underside, or sternum, is generally brown although there are small pockmarks across the whole upper surface. The area around the spider's eyes is black. Its face, particularly its clypeus and cheeks, have a dense covering of white hair. Its mouthparts, including its chelicerae, labium and maxillae, are also brown. It has two small teeth at the front and one behind in its chelicerae and a tiny endite tooth on its maxillae.

Behind its carapace, the spider has a brown abdomen that is typically 1.33 mm (0.05 in) long and 1.03 mm (0.04 in) wide. Its upperside is completely covered by a large hard shield-like scutum. The only break in the brown is a white stripe on its sides. Its spinnerets, used to spin webs, and its book lung covers are also brown, as are much of the front pair of legs. Some of their leg segments are yellow, as are the remainder of its legs. There are scale-like black bristles on its front legs. Its pedipalps, sensor organs near its mouth, are yellowish-brown. At the end of a pedipalp is the spider's copulatory organs. The palpal tibia is relatively simple but has a large projection, or tibial apophysis, sticking up. This runs parallel to the spider's smooth rounded cymbium, which is closely integrated to a smaller round palpal bulb. At the side of the bulb, there is a long embolus that runs down, around and out of the top, ending in a valley in the cymbium. It is the long length of the tibial apophysis that helps distinguish the species from Sibianor victoriae. The female has not been described.

== Distribution and habitat ==
Sibianor spiders are found across the Holarctic and Afrotropical realms. Sibianor kenyaensis lives in Botswana and Kenya. In Kenya, it has only seen in the coastal area near Kilifi. The holotype was discovered living amongst shrubs. It has also been found in Mopane woodland near the Okavango River in Botswana.
