= Sibianor victoriae =

Scientific classification
- Kingdom: Animalia
- Phylum: Arthropoda
- Subphylum: Chelicerata
- Class: Arachnida
- Order: Araneae
- Infraorder: Araneomorphae
- Family: Salticidae
- Genus: Sibianor
- Species: S. victoriae

Binomial name
- Sibianor victoriae Logunov, 2001

Species of jumping spider

Sibianor victoriae is a jumping spider species that lives in Kenya and South Africa. A member of the genus Sibianor, it is very small spider, it is typically between 2 and 2.6 mm (0.08 and 0.10 in) in length. The spider is generally brown with the male having a yellow-brown sternum, underside to its front section, and a grey-brown abdomen, and the female having a darker carapace, topside to its front section, and underside of its abdomen. The male spider's abdomen is covered in a large hard shield-like scutum. Its legs are yellow. The male has a distinctively simple projection on its copulatory organs called a tibial apophysis, the length and width of which distinguishes it from other spiders in the genus. The female has complex multi-chambered spermathecae, or receptacles, that form part of its internal copulatory organs. This also helps identify the species.

== Taxonomy and etymology ==
Sibianor victoriae is a species of jumping spider, a member of the family Salticidae. It was first described by the arachnologist Dmitri V. Logunov in 2001, who allocated it to the genus Sibianor. Phylogenetic analysis has confirmed that the genus is closely related to both Bianor and Microbianor. In 2017, Jerzy Prószyński designated them members of a group of genera named Harmochirines, named after the genus Harmochirus. The harmochirines, along with a group of species known as pellenines, are members of the subtribe Harmochirina. According to Wayne Maddison, this is part of the tribe Plexippini. The species' generic name is derived from Bianor. Bianor is the son of Tiberinus and Manto, a Trojan killed by Agamemnon and a centaur killed by Theseus. Sibianor victoriae is named for Logunov's sister Victoria V. Logunova. The holotype is stored in the American Museum of Natural History in New York City.

== Description ==
Sibianor spiders are small with little sexual dimorphism. Sibianor victoriae is particularly small, similar to the related Sibianor kenyaensis. The male has a light brown carapace, the hard upper part of the forward section of the spider, that is between 1 and 1.33 mm (0.04 and 0.05 in) long and between 0.7 and 1.09 mm (0.03 and 0.04 in) wide, and is covered in small indentations. The areas around its eyes is black. Its face, particularly its clypeus and cheeks, have a dense covering of white hair. The underside of its carapace, or sternum, is yellow-brown, as are its mouthparts, including its chelicerae, labium and maxillae. A small tooth is visible on its maxillae.

Behind its carapace, the spider has a grey-brown abdomen that is typically between 1 and 1.5 mm (0.04 and 0.06 in) long and between 1.13 and 1.3 mm (0.04 and 0.05 in) wide. Its upperside is completely covered by a large hard shield-like scutum. Its spinnerets, used to spin webs, and its book lung covers are brown. Its legs and its pedipalps, sensor organs near its mouth, are yellow. Its front pair of legs are darker, slightly swollen has feathery bristles on its underside. Its fourth pair of legs has two distinctive spines.

At the end of a pedipalp is the spider's copulatory organs. The palpal tibia is relatively simple but has a slightly curved projection, or tibial apophysis. This runs parallel to the spider's smooth rounded cymbium, which is closely integrated to a smaller round palpal bulb that has a conical peak. At the bottom of the bulb, there is an embolus that runs around and out of the top, ending in a valley in the cymbium. It is the length of the tibial apophysis that helps distinguish the species from Sibianor kenyaensis. Compared to the related Sibianor anansii, the spider can be distinguished by its narrower tibial apophysis and the lack of scales on its body.

The female Sibianor victoriae is very small, ranging in length between 2 and 2.6 mm (0.08 and 0.10 in) Its oval carapace is typically 1.1 mm (0.04 in) long and 0.9 mm (0.04 in) wide. It has dark brown and covered in a dense layer of very small white scales and short hairs, interspersed with a scattering of brown bristles. It sternum is a lighter brown. There is a covering of dense white hairs on its clypeus, like the male. There is a single tooth visible on its chelicerae. The remaining mouthparts are brown with pale tips.

The female has a brown abdomen that measures typically 1.5 mm (0.06 in) in length and 1.1 mm (0.04 in) in width. Along with white hairs and scales, there are brown bristles on its upper surface. Its underside is darker than its topside. Its spinnerets are brownish. Its legs and pedipalps are dark yellowish. Its epigyne, the visible external part of its copulatory organs, has a pocket in the middle flanked by two copulatory openings. These lead, via short insemination ducts, to relatively large multi-chambered spermathecae, or receptacles. The spermathecae show evidence of sclerotization. It is these multiple chambers that most clearly distinguishes the spider from others in the genus. The spider may be mimicking ladybirds.

== Distribution and habitat ==
Sibianor spiders are found across the Holarctic and Afrotropical realms. Sibianor victoriae lives in Kenya and South Africa. In Kenya, it has only seen in the coastal area near Kilifi. The holotype was discovered living amongst shrubs. It has also been found living near the ground amongst the grasses and herbs found in savanna.
