= Microbianor globosus =

Scientific classification
- Kingdom: Animalia
- Phylum: Arthropoda
- Subphylum: Chelicerata
- Class: Arachnida
- Order: Araneae
- Infraorder: Araneomorphae
- Family: Salticidae
- Genus: Microbianor
- Species: M. globosus

Binomial name
- Microbianor globosus Haddad & Wesołowska, 2011

Species of spider

Microbianor globosus is a species of jumping spider in the genus Microbianor that lives in South Africa. It lives on the banks of the Orange River in Northern Cape. The species was first described in 2011 by Charles Haddad and Wanda Wesołowska. It is a very small spider, with a carapace typically 1.1 mm (0.043 in) long and an abdomen typically 1.2 millimetres (0.047 in) long. The carapace is high, broad, short and almost completely dark brown. The abdomen is oval with a white pattern of patches around a central line. The front pair of legs are longer and brown, the remainder being yellow. The male has a characteristic long embolus that curves around the palpal bulb. There is an unusually large spike or apophysis on the pedipalp tibia. This helps identify the species. The female has not been described.

== Taxonomy ==
Microbianor globosus is a species of jumping spider that was first described by Charles Haddad and Wanda Wesołowska in 2011. It was one of over 500 species identified by the Polish arachnologist Wesolowska during her career, making her one of the most prolific in the field. They allocated it to the genus Microbianor, which he had first circumscribed by Dmitri Logunov in 2000. The genus name was derived from the way that the spiders related to the genus Bianor and that they were small, less than 3 mm (0.12 in) in length. Bianor was named in honour of a Greek poet of the first century. The species itself is named for a Latin word that can be translated "globose" and relates to the shape of the palpal bulb.

The genus is related to Bianor and Harmochirus. Subsequent genetic analysis has shown that it is also related toPellenes and other genera grouped in Jerzy Prószyński's Pellenae. These were allocated to the Plexippoida. In 2015, Wayne Maddison grouped the genus along with Bianor and Sibianor into the harmochirines subgroup of the subtribe Harmochirina. He allocated it to the tribe Plexippini. This tribe is allocated to the subclade Saltafresia in the clade Salticoida. In 2016, Prószyński created a group of genera named Harmochirines, named after the genus Harmochirus, which contains the genera.

== Description ==
The spider is very small and stout. The male has a carapace that measures typically 1.1 mm (0.04 in) in length and 1.0 mm (0.04 in) in width. It is high, broad and short, dark brown and covered in dark hairs apart from white hairs on the front edges. The eye field is darker, covered in long bristles with a scattering of white scales near the eyes themselves. The mouthparts consist of light brown chelicerae that are unidentate and maxilae that are straight with a small bump on the very edges. The underside of the carapace, the sternum, is dark. The oval abdomen is typically 1.2 mm (0.05 in) long and 0.9 mm (0.04 in) wide. It is slightly flattened with a large scutum. The topside is brown with a pattern consisting of a thin line down most of the middle and six patches on the sides arranged in pairs, the rearmost ones the largest, made of white hairs. The underside is dark. The spinnerets are brown. The front legs are brown. They have a slightly swollen tibia. The remaining legs are smaller than the front pair and yellow. They have a single spine on them. The pedipalps are brown. They have a short tibia with a very large curved spike or apophysis. The palpal bulb is rounded with an extension on the tegulum. The embolus is long, stretching round the palpal bulb, with a curved thin tip. The large tibial apophysis is the most distinctive feature of the species and enables it to be distinguished from others in the genus. The female has not been described.

== Distribution and habitat ==
The first Microbianor species were found in Seychelles and the other islands of the Indian Ocean. Microbianor globosus is the first to be discovered in continental Africa. It is endemic to South Africa. The holotype was discovered near Prieska in Northern Cape in 2009. It lives on grass tussocks on the banks of the Orange River.
