= Sibianor nigriculus =

Scientific classification
- Kingdom: Animalia
- Phylum: Arthropoda
- Subphylum: Chelicerata
- Class: Arachnida
- Order: Araneae
- Infraorder: Araneomorphae
- Family: Salticidae
- Genus: Sibianor
- Species: S. nigriculus

Binomial name
- Sibianor nigriculus (Logunov & Wesołowska, 1992)

Species of spider

Sibianor nigriculus is a jumping spider species that lives in Japan, Korea and Russia. The species was originally identified in 1992 and placed in the genus Harmochirus but was moved to Sibianor when that genus was established in 2000. Sibianor nigriculus is closely related to Sibianor aurocinctus and Sibianor turkestanicus, which makes the spiders hard to distinguish, particularly the females of S. aurocinctus and S. nigriculus.
