= Napoca insignis =

Scientific classification
- Kingdom: Animalia
- Phylum: Arthropoda
- Subphylum: Chelicerata
- Class: Arachnida
- Order: Araneae
- Infraorder: Araneomorphae
- Family: Salticidae
- Genus: Napoca
- Species: N. insignis

Binomial name
- Napoca insignis (O. P-Cambridge, 1872)

Synonyms
- Salticus insignis

Species of jumping spider

Napoca insignis is a species of the jumping spiders found in Israel.

The species is known from only a single male specimen. It can be distinguished from similar spiders such as Bianor and Sibianor by its sclerotized, bean-shaped abdomen, which overhangs the carapace. In addition, the posterior median eyes are close to the anterior lateral eyes, while they are midway between the anterior lateral eyes and posterior lateral eyes in related genera. The holotype is housed at Oxford University.
