= Bianor senegalensis =

Scientific classification
- Kingdom: Animalia
- Phylum: Arthropoda
- Subphylum: Chelicerata
- Class: Arachnida
- Order: Araneae
- Infraorder: Araneomorphae
- Family: Salticidae
- Genus: Bianor
- Species: B. senegalensis

Binomial name
- Bianor senegalensis Logunov, 2001

Species of spider

Bianor senegalensis is a species of jumping spider in the genus Bianor that lives in Senegal. It was first described in 2001 by Dmitri Logunov. Only the male has been described. The spider is small with a carapace that is typically 1.9 mm (0.075 in) long and an abdomen that is 2 mm (0.079 in) long. The carapace is dark russet, rough with a pattern of white scales and the abdomen grey-brown with a pattern of white patches arranged in two rows. White scales also cover part of the clypeus. The tegulum is simple and of a unique shape that enables the species to be differentiated from others in the genus.

== Taxonomy ==
Bianor senegalensis was first described by Dmitri Logunov in 2001. He placed it in the genus Bianor, first described by George and Elizabeth Peckham in 1885. Bianor is the son of Tiberinus and Manto, a Trojan killed by Agamemnon and a centaur killed by Theseus. The genus was allocated to the subfamily Pelleninae, alongside the genus Pellenes. It was listed in the subtribe Harmochirina in the tribe Plexippini by Wayne Maddison in 2015. These were allocated to the clade Saltafresia. In 2017, the genus was grouped with nine other genera of jumping spiders under the name Harmochirines, named after the genus Harmochirus. The genus is related to Sibianor. The species is named after the country where it was found.

== Description ==
Bianor senegalensis is small and unidentate. The male has a dark russet carapace that is typically 1.9 mm (0.075 in) long and 1.55 mm (0.061 in) wide. It is quite high, has a pattern of white scales and an uneven net-like patchwork. It is rough in texture, akin to shagreen to touch. The eye field is black. The abdomen is typically 2 mm (0.079 in) long and 1.28 mm (0.050 in) wide. It is grey-brown on the top with a large scute and a pattern of two rows of white patches. The sides are grey-brown with white spots. The underside is yellow-brown. The clypeus is brown partially covered with white scales. The legs are dark brown. The spinnerets are brown-yellow. The pedipalps are brown. The tegulum is simple and the tibia has a short apophysis, or appendage. The embolus is also short. The female has not been described.

The species can be differentiated from other Bianor spiders by the shape of its tegulum and the position of the seminal duct. It also differs from the related Bianor kovacsi in having extensive scales on its clypeus.

== Distribution and habitat ==
Bianor senegalensis is endemic to Senegal. The holotype was found near Dakar in 1945.
