= Napoca =

Napoca can refer to:

- Cluj-Napoca, a major city in Transylvania, Romania
- Napoca (ancient city), an ancient Roman settlement in Dacia, on the location of present-day Cluj-Napoca
- Napoca (castra), the Roman fort for the ancient city Napoca
- Napoca (spider), a genus of jumping spiders known only from Israel, named after the ancient city
