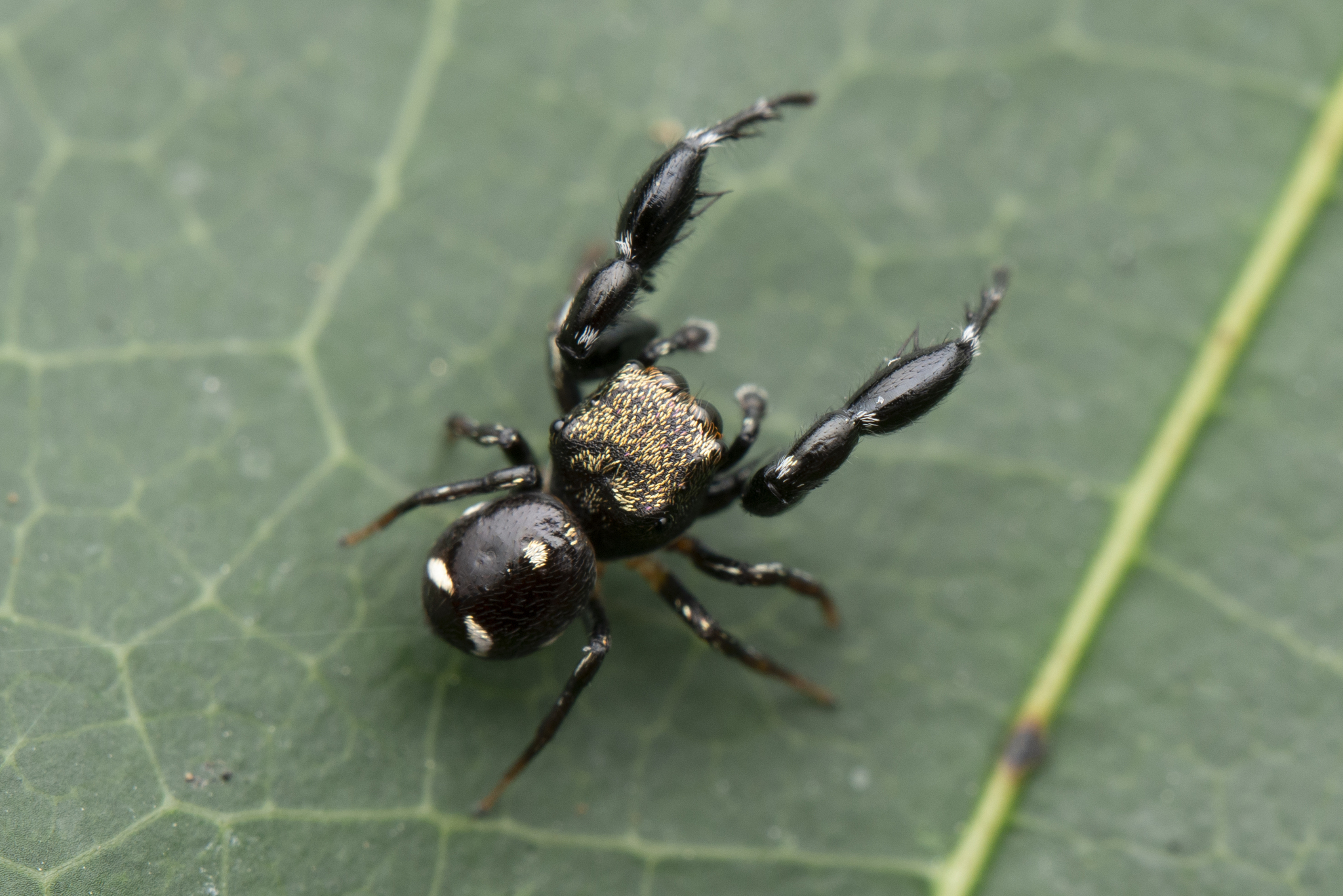
- from Hong Kong

Scientific classification
- Kingdom: Animalia
- Phylum: Arthropoda
- Subphylum: Chelicerata
- Class: Arachnida
- Order: Araneae
- Infraorder: Araneomorphae
- Family: Salticidae
- Genus: Harmochirus
- Species: H. insulanus

Binomial name
- Harmochirus insulanus (Kishida, 1914)

Synonyms
- Chirothecia insulana Kishida, 1914; Harmochirus brachiatus (Bösenberg & Strand, 1906) (misidentified); Harmochirus pullus (Bohdanowicz & Prószyński, 1987) (misidentified)

= Harmochirus insulanus =

Species of jumping spider

Harmochirus insulanus is a species of jumping spider in the genus Harmochirus. It was originally described as Chirothecia insulana by Kishida in 1914 and was transferred to its current genus by Logunov, Ikeda & Ono in 1997.

== Taxonomy ==
The species was initially described by Kishida in 1914 as Chirothecia insulana, but this description was omitted from all previous catalogs. For many years, specimens of this species were misidentified as either Harmochirus brachiatus or Harmochirus pullus by various authors. The confusion was resolved in 1997 when Logunov, Ikeda & Ono transferred the species from Chirothecia to Harmochirus and distinguished it from the closely related H. brachiatus.

== Distribution ==
H. insulanus is distributed across East Asia, having been recorded from China, Korea, Japan, and Vietnam. In Japan, it occurs on Honshu, Shikoku and Kyushu.

== Description ==
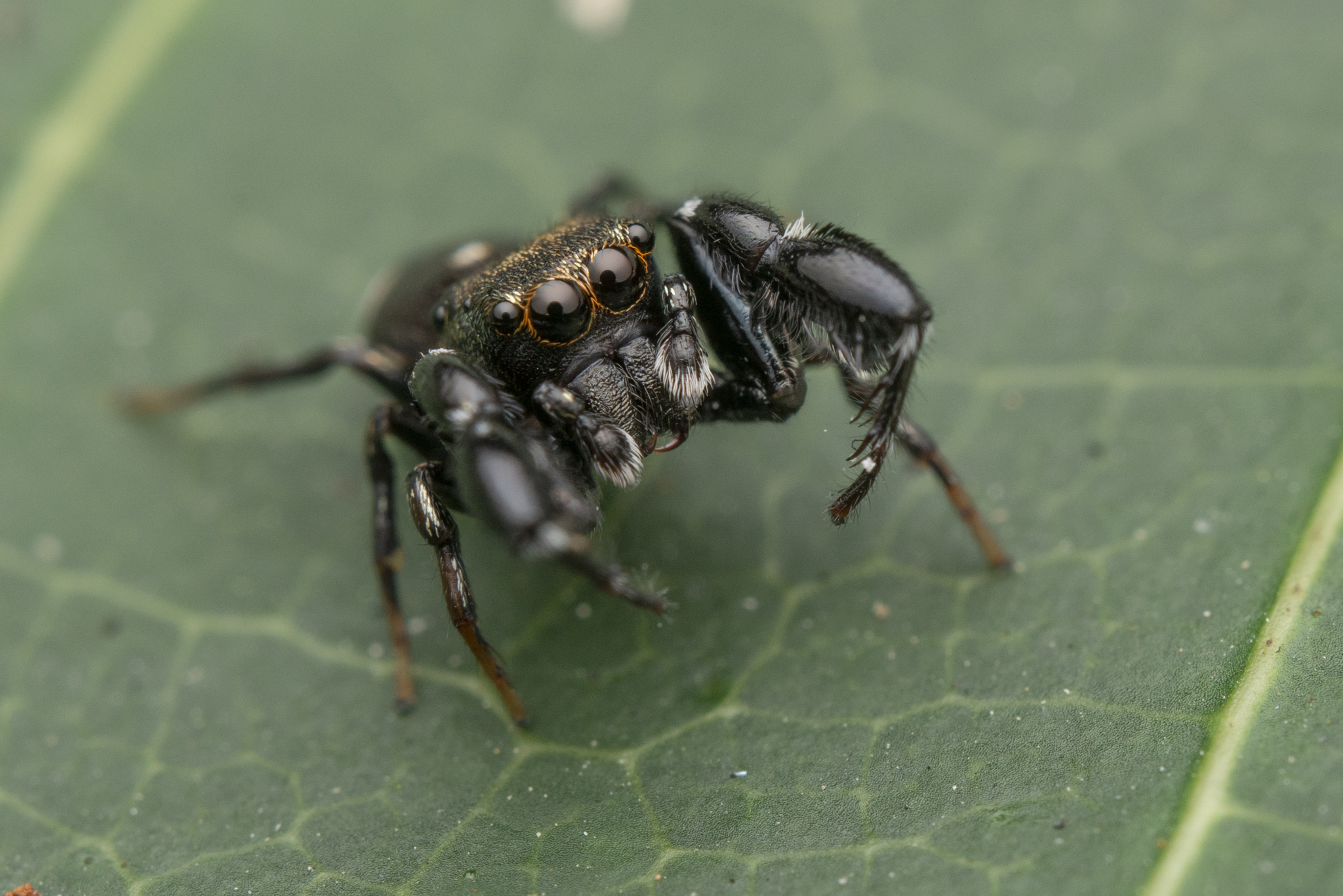

Males have a black prosoma covered with white scales dorsally, frontally and laterally. The clypeus is black with eyes surrounded by brown hairs. The opisthosoma is blackish brown with a posterior transverse band of white scales. The first pair of legs are black except for brown metatarsus and tarsus, with distinctive rows of black, scale-like setae on specific surfaces. The remaining legs have black femora and yellowish brown patellae, tibiae, metatarsi and tarsi. Females are generally paler in coloration.

The male palp has a short, non-coiled embolus and a spherical tegulum with a membranous peak on the retrolateral surface. The female epigyne has a central structure with copulatory openings situated anteriorly and short, simple insemination ducts.

H. insulanus is closely related to H. brachiatus but can be distinguished by the shape and position of the membranous tegular "peak" in males and the structure of the spermathecae in females.
