= Napoca (spider) =

Scientific classification
- Kingdom: Animalia
- Phylum: Arthropoda
- Subphylum: Chelicerata
- Class: Arachnida
- Order: Araneae
- Infraorder: Araneomorphae
- Family: Salticidae
- Subfamily: Salticinae
- Genus: Napoca; Simon, 1901

Type species
- N. insignis (O. Pickard-Cambridge, 1872)

Species
- N. constanzeae Logunov & Schäfer, 2017 – Spain; N. insignis (O. Pickard-Cambridge, 1872) – Israel

Genus of spiders

Napoca is a genus of jumping spiders that was first described by Eugène Louis Simon in 1901. As of July 2019 it contains only two species, found only in Israel and Spain: N. constanzeae and N. insignis. It is one of seven genera comprising the Harmochireae clade within the Dendryphantinae subfamily.

It can be distinguished from similar genera such as Bianor and Sibianor by its sclerotized, bean-shaped abdomen, which overhangs the carapace. In addition, the posterior median eyes are much closer to the anterior lateral eyes than they are in related genera.
