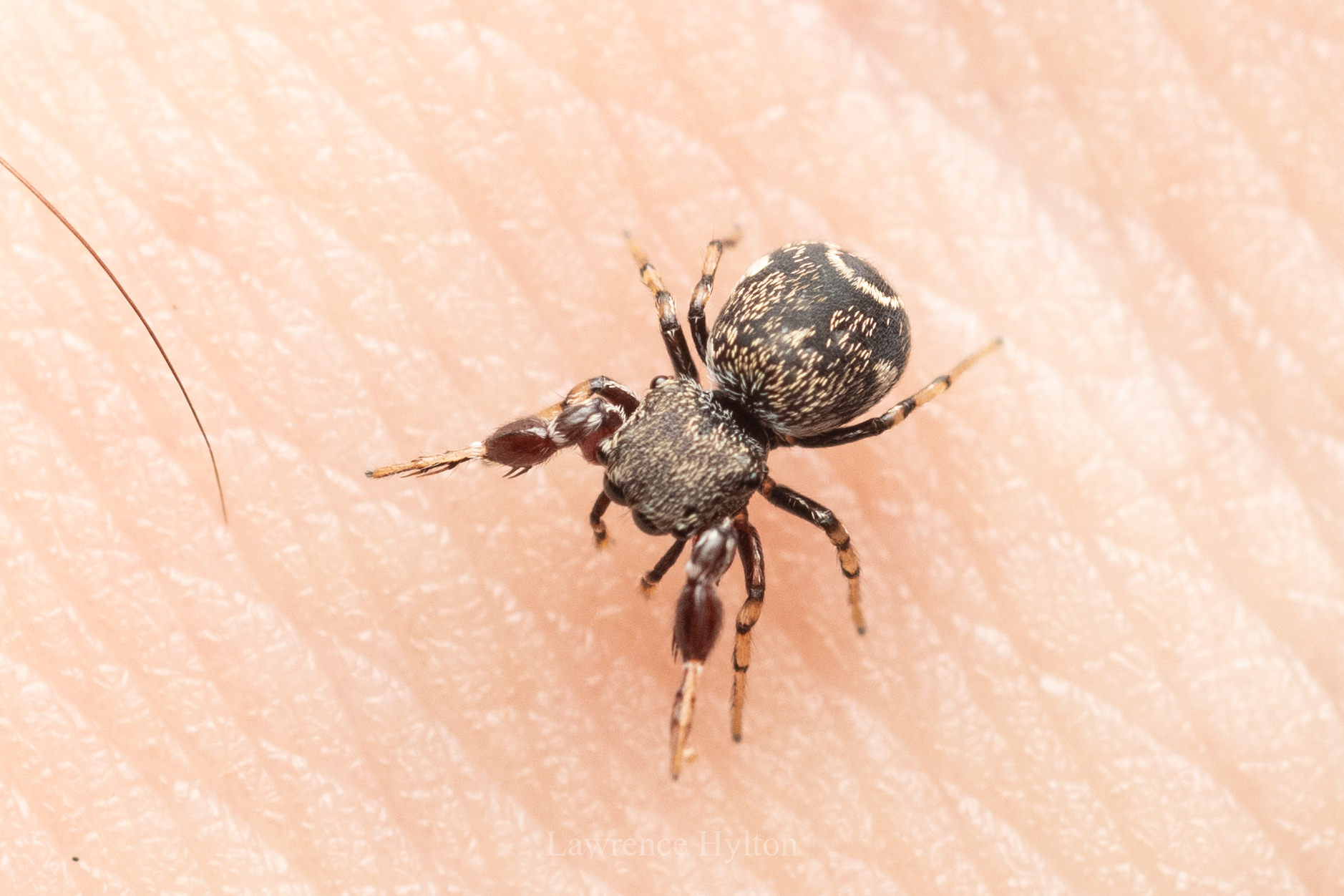
- H. brachiatus from Indonesia

Scientific classification
- Kingdom: Animalia
- Phylum: Arthropoda
- Subphylum: Chelicerata
- Class: Arachnida
- Order: Araneae
- Infraorder: Araneomorphae
- Family: Salticidae
- Genus: Harmochirus
- Species: H. brachiatus

Binomial name
- Harmochirus brachiatus (Thorell, 1877)

Synonyms
- Ballus brachiatus Thorell, 1877; Harmochirus malaccensis Simon, 1885; Harmochirus nervosus Thorell, 1890

= Harmochirus brachiatus =

Species of spider

Harmochirus brachiatus is a species of jumping spider in the family Salticidae. It is the type species of the genus Harmochirus and is widely distributed across Asia.

== Taxonomy ==
The species was originally described as Ballus brachiatus by Tamerlan Thorell in 1877 from specimens collected in Celebes (now Sulawesi). Subsequently, two additional species were described that are now considered junior synonyms: Harmochirus malaccensis Simon, 1885 from Malacca, and Harmochirus nervosus Thorell, 1890. Simon established the current synonymy in 1903, combining all three names under Harmochirus brachiatus.

The taxonomic status of this species has been subject to some uncertainty, as noted by Prószyński & Deeleman-Reinhold (2010), who emphasized that the considerable morphological variation observed across the species' wide distribution range may indicate the presence of multiple species currently lumped under this name.

== Distribution ==
H. brachiatus has a wide Asian distribution, having been recorded from India, Bhutan, Bangladesh, China, Taiwan, Korea, Thailand, Vietnam, Malaysia, and Indonesia. The species appears to be particularly common in Southeast Asia, where it has been extensively studied in countries such as the Philippines, Indonesia, and Malaysia.

== Habitat ==
The species is commonly found in agricultural environments, particularly in rice fields, where it functions as a predator of pest insects. It also inhabits forest litter and secondary forest environments.

== Description ==
Harmochirus brachiatus exhibits the characteristic appearance typical of the genus Harmochirus. The species shows significant sexual dimorphism, with males being particularly distinctive.

=== Male ===
Males have a flat eye field that is rhomboidal in shape and broadest at the posterior lateral eyes. The thoracic portion of the carapace is steep and almost vertical. The abdomen is oval and relatively short, approximately as long as the carapace, with the dorsal surface covered by a dark scutum.

The most striking feature of males is their enlarged first pair of legs, which have long, broad femora, patellae, and ovoid tibiae that contrast sharply with the thin, elongated metatarsi and tarsi. The width of the tibiae is further enhanced by rows of long, dense black setae.

The male palpus has a nearly round bulbus, except for the anterior portion which is flattened transversally. The tibial apophysis is approximately as long as the bulbus, relatively narrow throughout its length, and gently curved upward without basal broadening.

=== Female ===
Females are less distinctive than males but can be identified by their epigyne structure. The epigyne has a complex internal structure with complicated copulatory ducts. The sclerotized ducts form broad, flattened loops before connecting to spherical, apparently two-chambered spermathecae. A notable characteristic is the absence of C-shaped sections in the sclerotized copulatory ducts, which distinguishes this genus from related genera such as Bianor and Sibianor.

== Ecology ==
H. brachiatus plays an important ecological role as a predator in agricultural ecosystems, particularly in rice cultivation systems across Asia. The species has been extensively documented as a beneficial predator that helps control pest insects in rice fields.
