= Bianor compactus =

Conservation status
- Not Threatened (NZ TCS)

Scientific classification
- Kingdom: Animalia
- Phylum: Arthropoda
- Subphylum: Chelicerata
- Class: Arachnida
- Order: Araneae
- Infraorder: Araneomorphae
- Family: Salticidae
- Genus: Bianor
- Species: B. compactus

Binomial name
- Bianor compactus (Urquhart, 1885)

Synonyms
- Salticus compactus

Species of spider

Bianor compactus is a species of jumping spider that is endemic to New Zealand.

== Taxonomy ==
This species was described as Salticus compactus in 1885 by Arthur Urquhart from female specimens. It has been revised numerous times.

== Description ==
The female is recorded at 4mm in length.

== Distribution ==
This species is known from Nelson and Lake Tekapo in New Zealand, but is probably widespread.

== Conservation status ==
Under the New Zealand Threat Classification System, this species is listed as "Not Threatened" with the qualifier of "Sparse".
