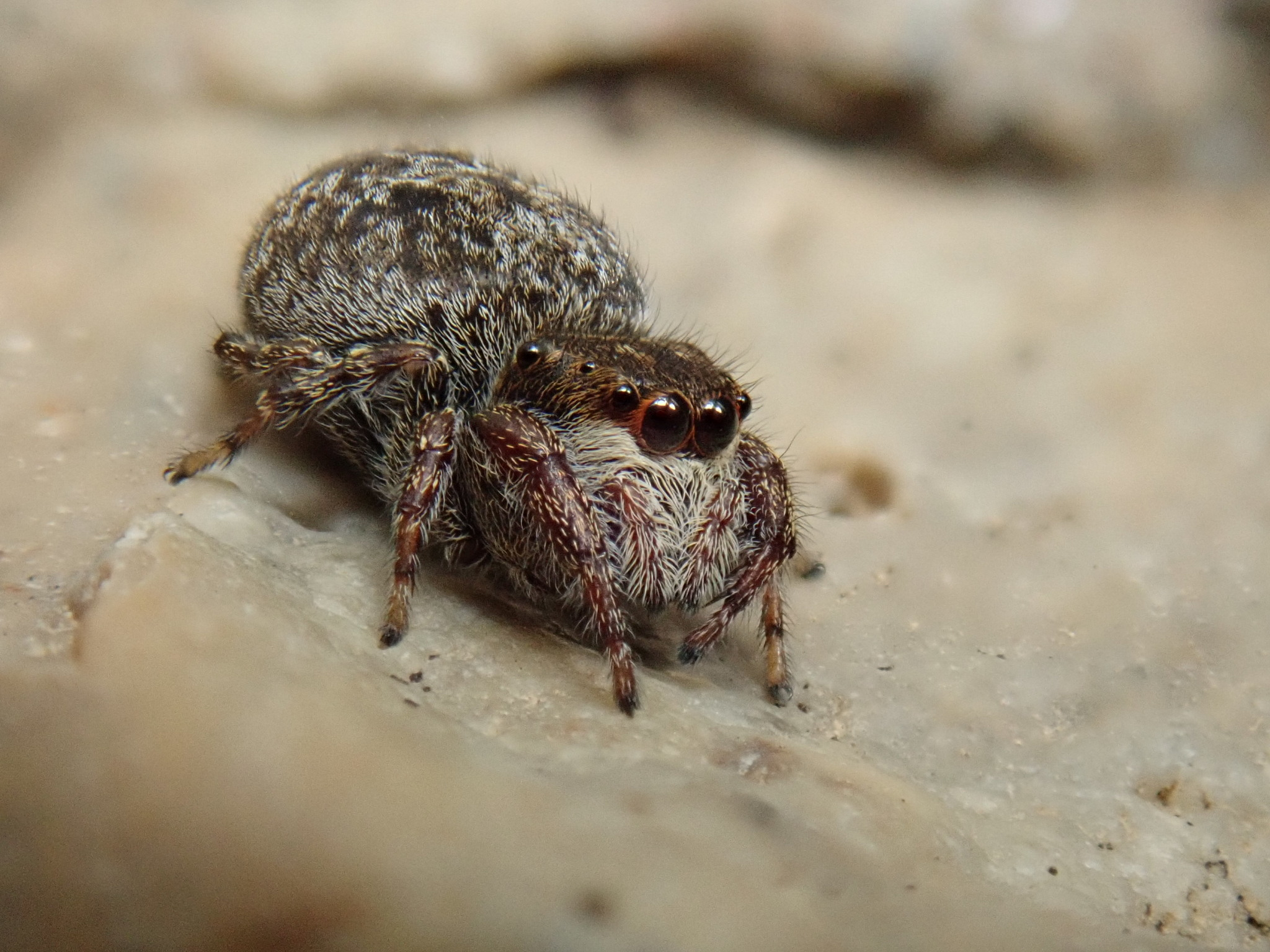
- female
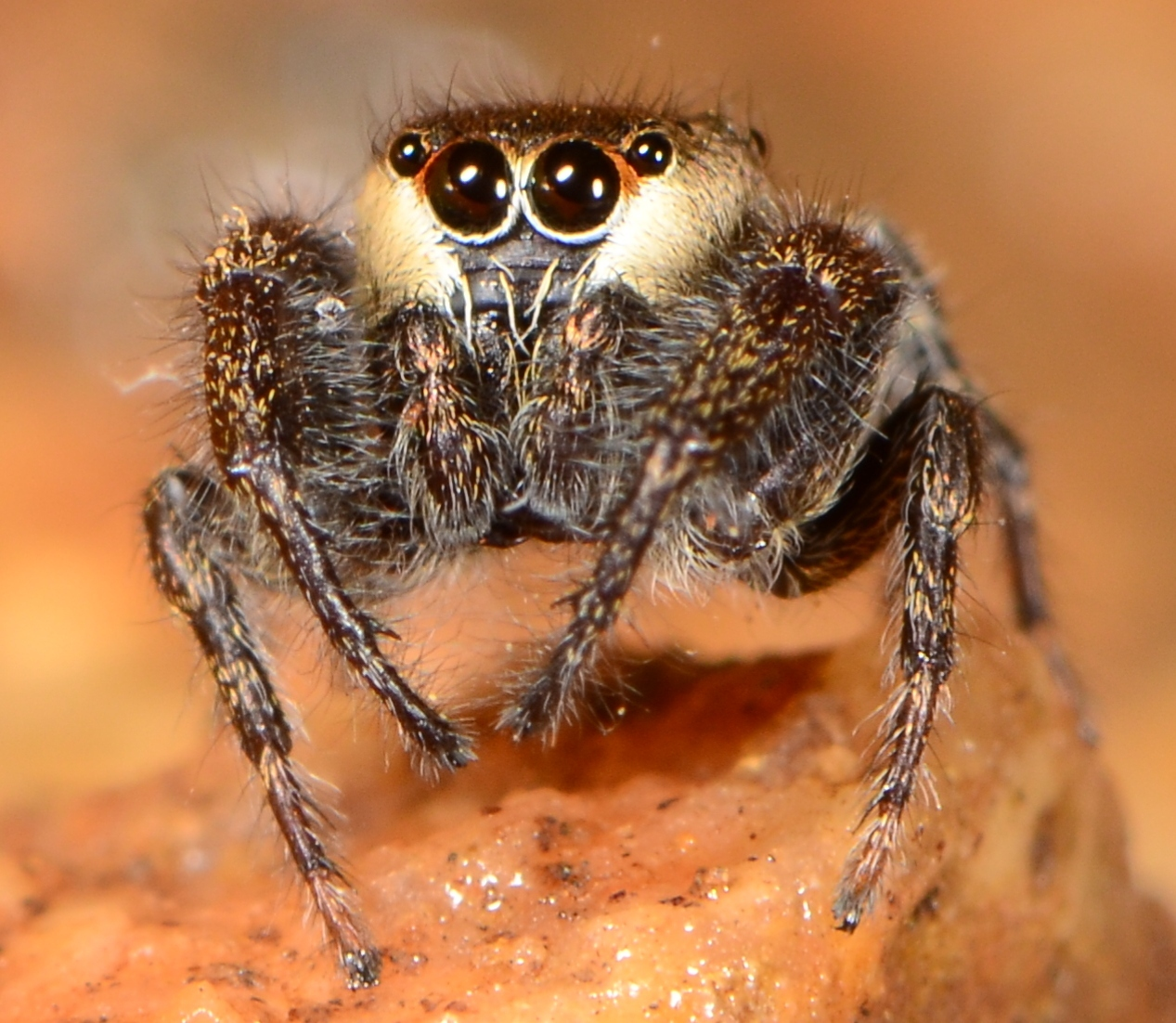
- male

Scientific classification
- Kingdom: Animalia
- Phylum: Arthropoda
- Subphylum: Chelicerata
- Class: Arachnida
- Order: Araneae
- Infraorder: Araneomorphae
- Family: Salticidae
- Genus: Bianor
- Species: B. albobimaculatus

Binomial name
- Bianor albobimaculatus (Lucas, 1846)

Synonyms
- Salticus albobimaculatus Lucas, 1846; Plexippa albobimaculata Simon, 1864; Attus parcus Simon, 1868; Attus albobimaculatus Simon, 1871; Salticus putus O. Pickard-Cambridge, 1872; Eris albobimaculatus Peckham & Peckham, 1895; Ericulus albobimaculatus Kulczyński, 1901; Bianor rusticulus Peckham & Peckham, 1903; Dendryphantes albobimaculatus Strand, 1909; Bianor putus Reimoser, 1919; Bianor pulchellus Wesołowska & van Harten, 1994; Bianor scutatus Wesołowska & van Harten, 1994; Bianor aurocinctus Metzner, 1999

= Bianor albobimaculatus =

Four-Spotted Bianor Jumping Spider

Species of spider

Bianor albobimaculatus is a species of spider in the family Salticidae. It is widespread across Africa, the Mediterranean, Asia and India, and is commonly known as the four-spotted Bianor jumping spider.

== Distribution ==
Bianor albobimaculatus is found across Africa, the Mediterranean to Russia, Georgia, Azerbaijan, Kazakhstan, Iran, Central Asia, Afghanistan, Pakistan, India and Nepal.

In South Africa, it is known from Eastern Cape Province, Gauteng Province, KwaZulu-Natal Province, Limpopo Province, North West Province and Western Cape Province.

== Habitat and ecology ==
These are free-living plant-dwellers.

In South Africa, specimens were sampled at ground level at the bases of plants but also seen to drop from tall trees such as Vachellia and Cassia species. They were also sampled from cotton fields. Mating takes place during spring. They were found in the Fynbos, Savanna and Nama Karoo biomes at altitudes ranging from 7 to 1,752 m.

== Description ==
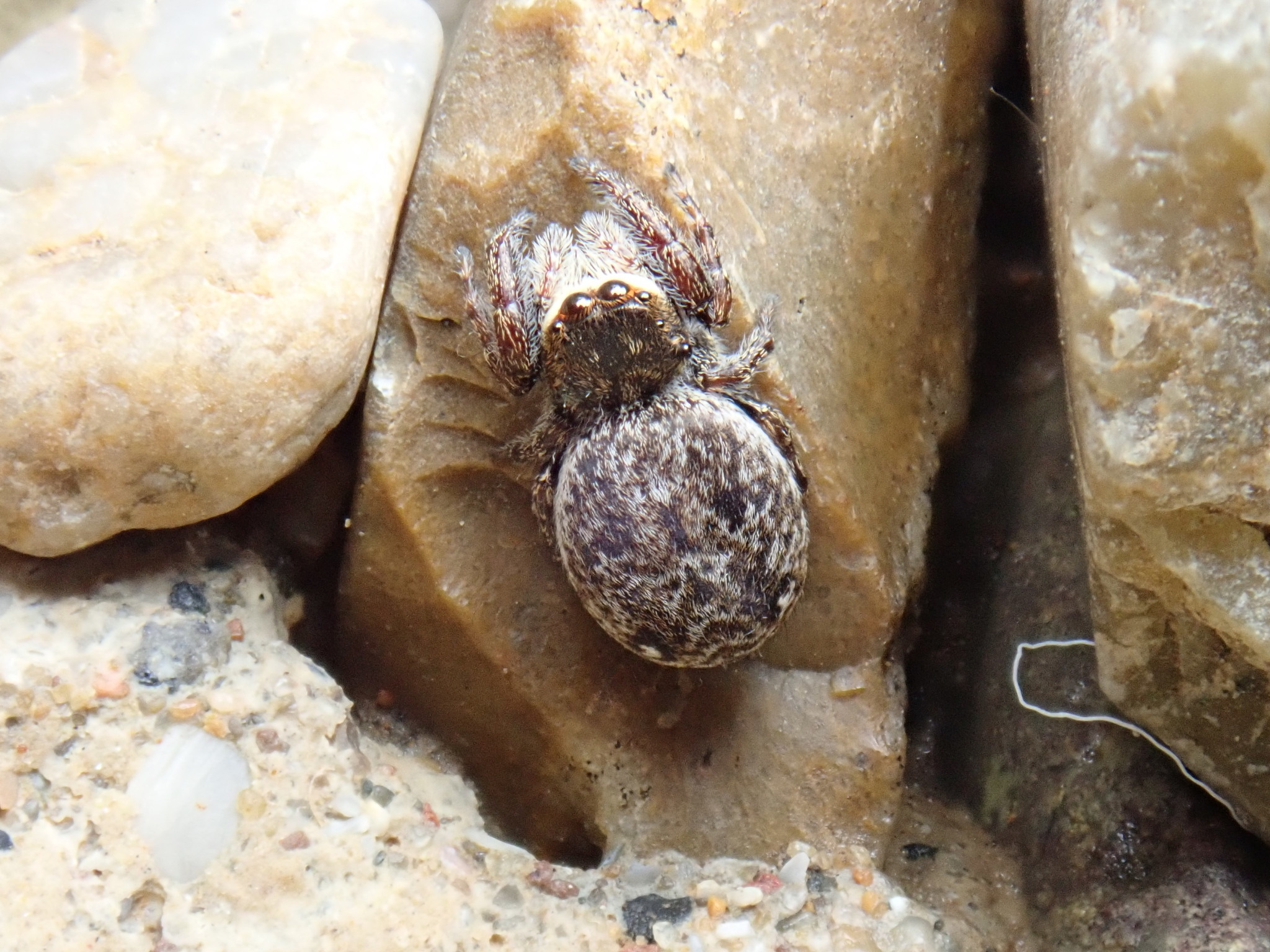
female

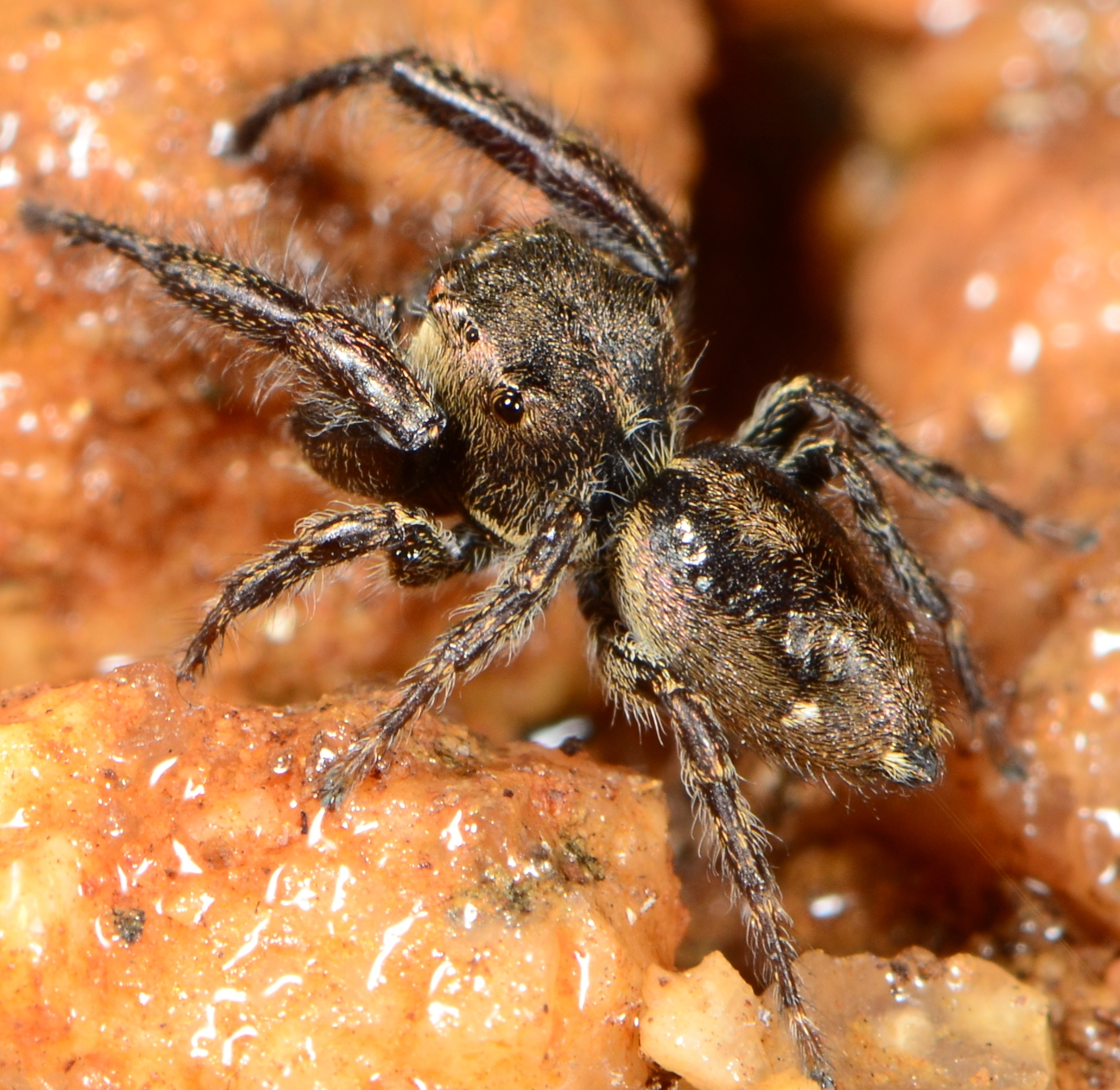
male

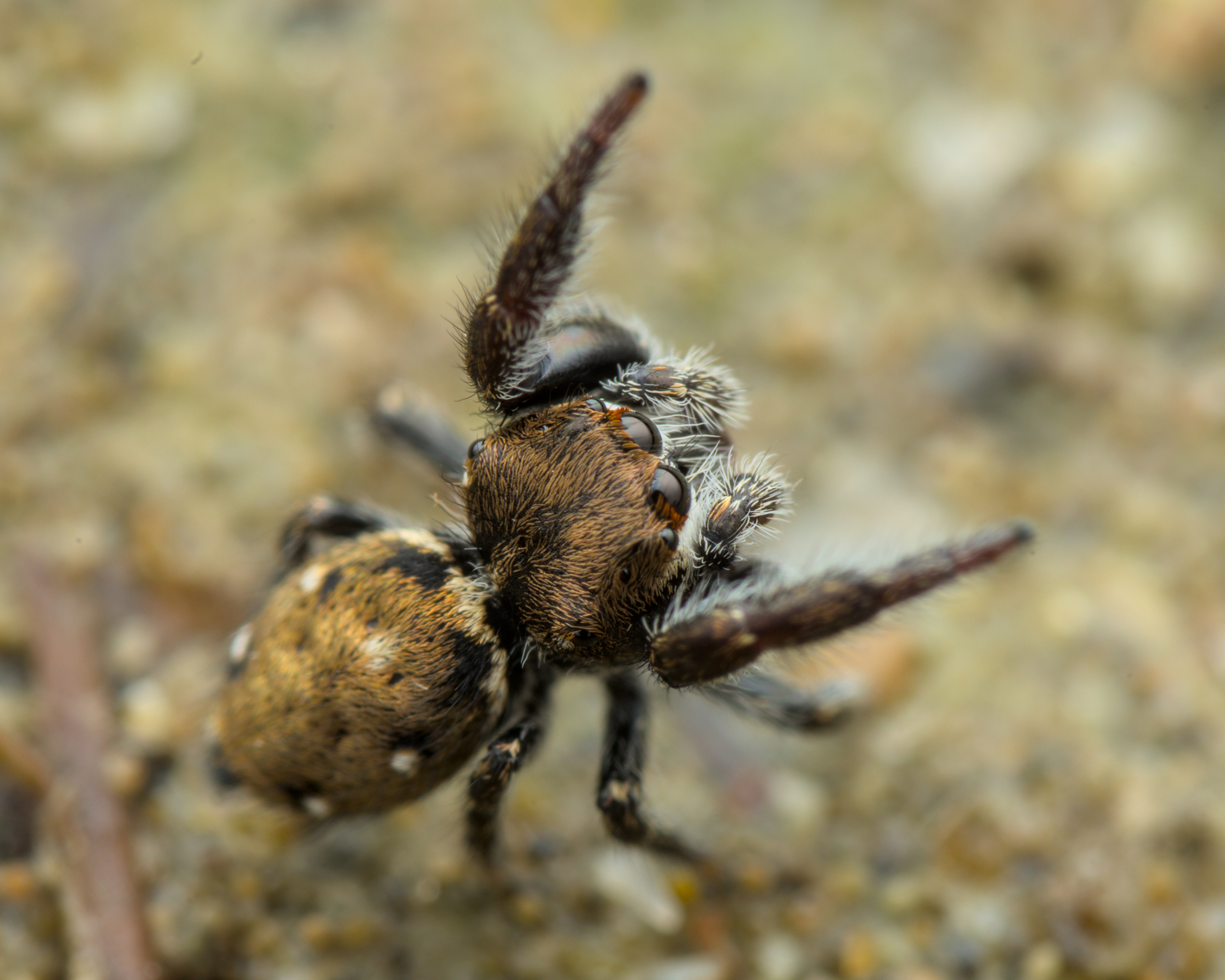
male

== Taxonomy ==
Bianor albobimaculatus was originally described by Lucas in 1846 as Salticus albobimaculatus from Algeria. The genus was revised by Logunov in 2001, who synonymized several species with B. albobimaculatus.
