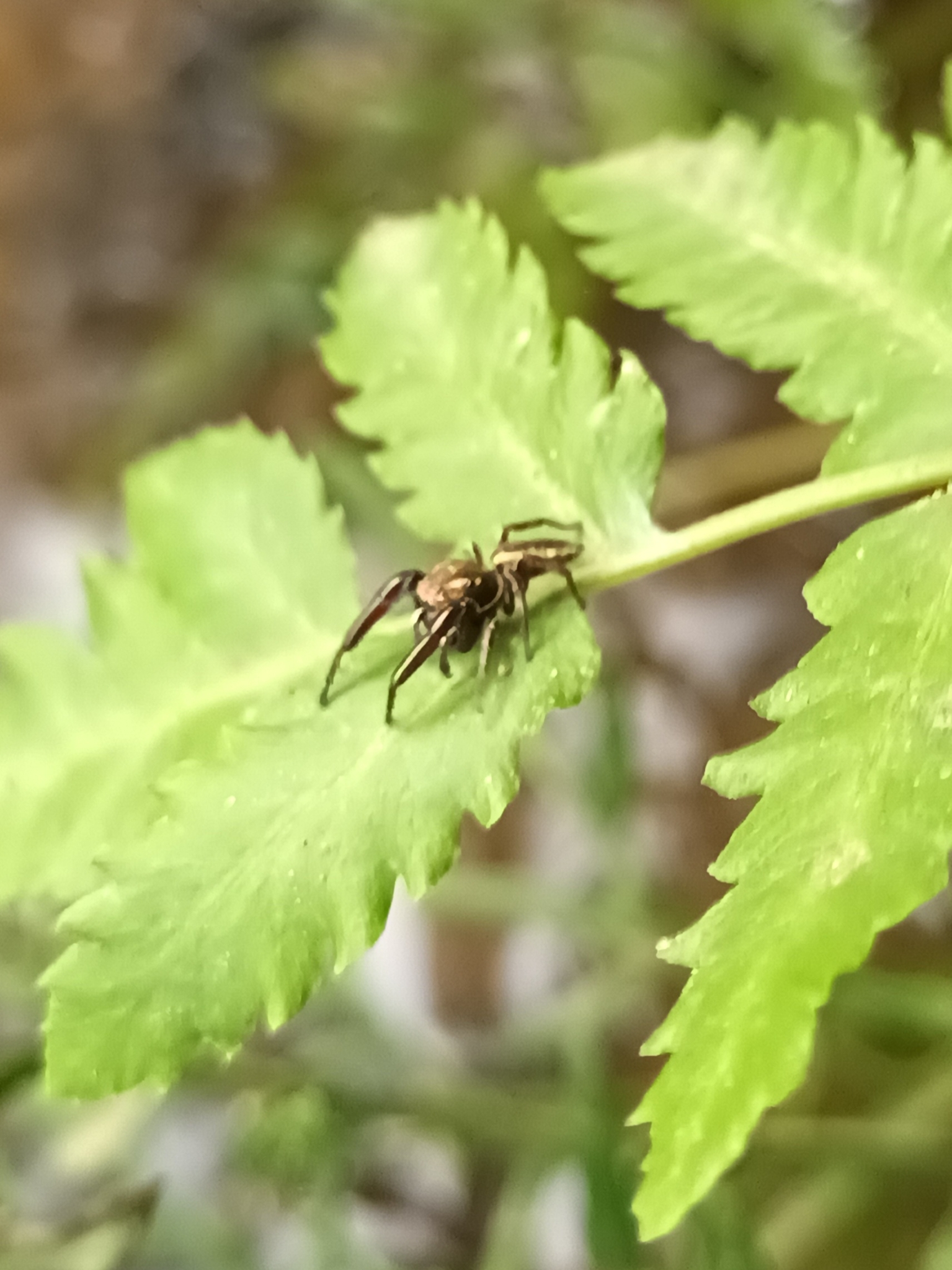

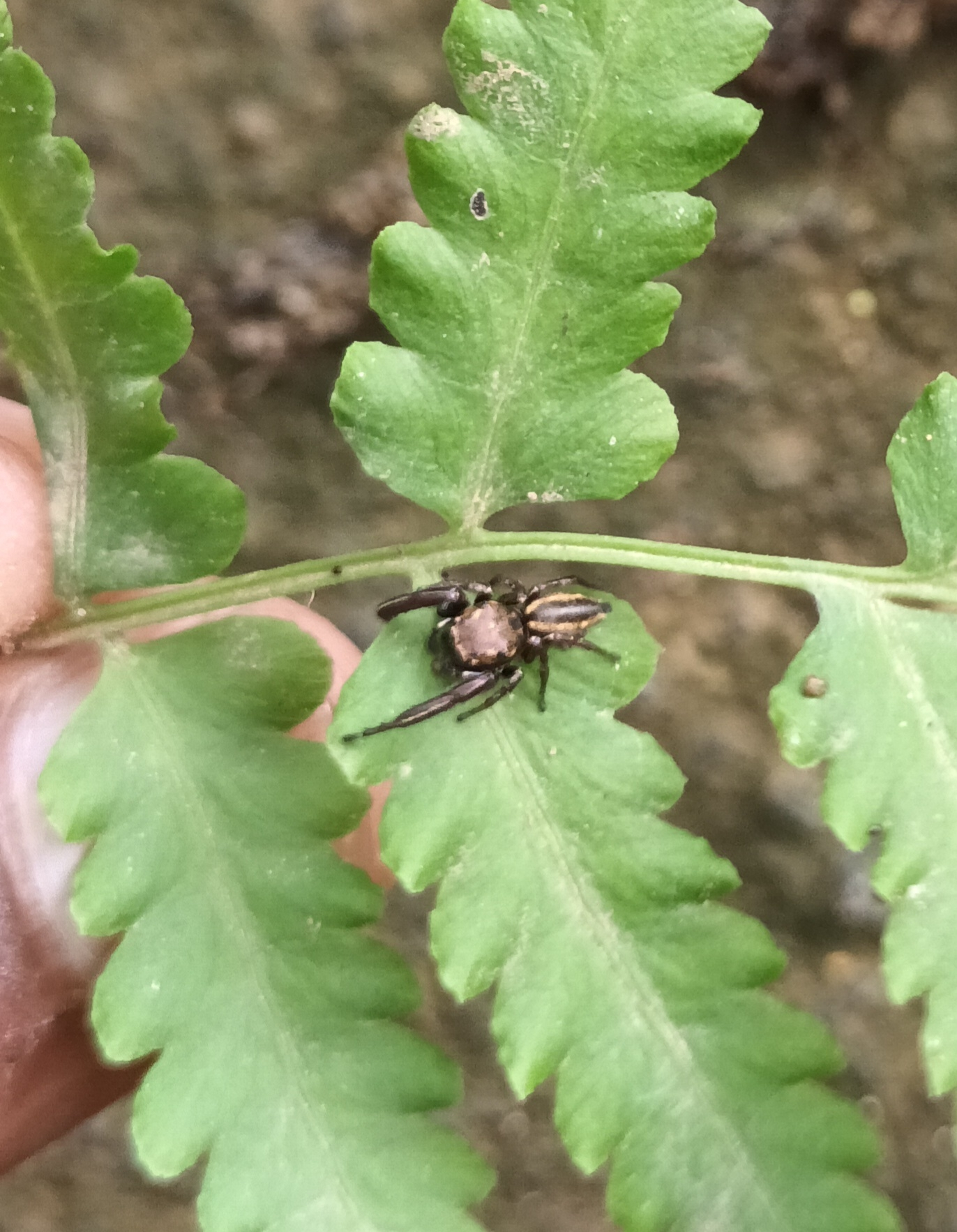

Scientific classification
- Kingdom: Animalia
- Phylum: Arthropoda
- Subphylum: Chelicerata
- Class: Arachnida
- Order: Araneae
- Infraorder: Araneomorphae
- Family: Salticidae
- Genus: Bianor
- Species: B. angulosus

Binomial name
- Bianor angulosus (Karsch, 1879)

Synonyms
- Ballus angulosus Karsch, 1879; Bianor leucostictus Thorell, 1890; Bianor trepidans Thorell, 1895; Stertinius leucostictus Simon, 1901; Simaetha angulosa Simon, 1903; Stichius albomaculatus Roewer, 1955; Bianor hotingchiehi Schenkel, 1963; Bianor simoni Żabka, 1985; Bianor hotingchiechi Zhao, 1993; Rhene haldanei Gajbe, 2004; Bianor incitatus Prószyński, 2017

= Bianor angulosus =

Species of spider

Bianor angulosus, is a species of spider of the genus Bianor. It is found in Sri Lanka, India to China, Vietnam, and Indonesia.

== Taxonomy ==
It was first described in 1879 by Ferdinand Karsch as Ballus angulosus, undergoing many name changes until in 1979 Dmitri Logunov transferred it to the new genus, Bianor.
