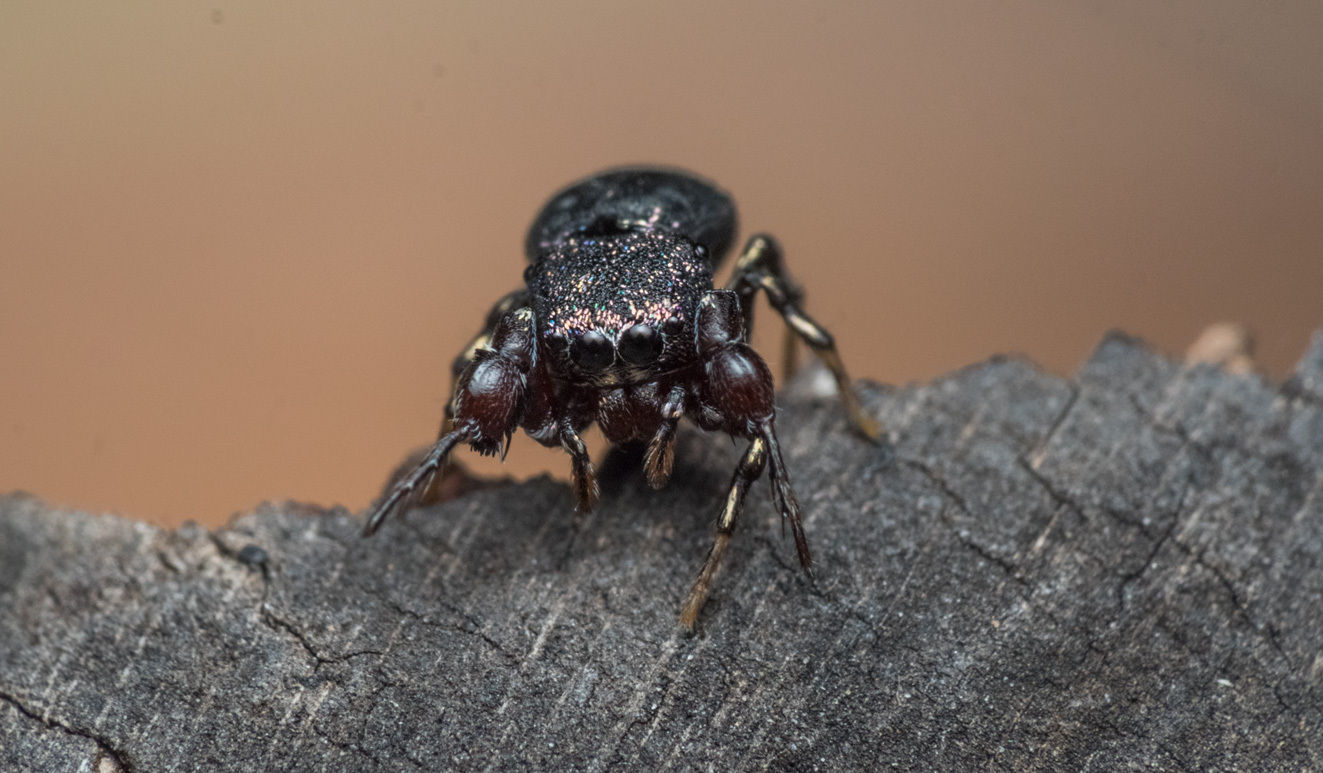
- female Harmochirus exaggeratus

Scientific classification
- Kingdom: Animalia
- Phylum: Arthropoda
- Subphylum: Chelicerata
- Class: Arachnida
- Order: Araneae
- Infraorder: Araneomorphae
- Family: Salticidae
- Genus: Harmochirus
- Species: H. exaggeratus

Binomial name
- Harmochirus exaggeratus Caleb & Mathai, 2015

= Harmochirus exaggeratus =

Species of jumping spider from India

Harmochirus exaggeratus, sometimes referred to as the Indian beetle jumping spider, is a species of jumping spider in the family Salticidae. It is native to India and is notable for exhibiting lateral beetle-like mimicry when viewed from the side.

== Taxonomy ==
The species was described in 2015 by Caleb and Mathai from specimens collected in Chennai, Tamil Nadu, India.

It belongs to the genus Harmochirus, a group of small-bodied jumping spiders distributed across parts of Asia.

== Description ==
Harmochirus exaggeratus is a small spider measuring approximately 3–5 mm in body length. Females (about 4.4 mm) are larger and more robust than males (about 3.4 mm). The species displays earthy brown coloration with scattered iridescent gold to violet scales.

== Mimicry ==
Unlike many Indian salticids that mimic ants, H. exaggeratus has been observed to resemble a small domed beetle when viewed from a low lateral angle.

When stationary with legs compact and body pressed close to the substrate, the spider presents a smooth curved silhouette similar to certain beetles such as coccinellids. The first pair of legs may be raised in a posture resembling insect antennae. This resemblance has been interpreted as possible Batesian (defensive) or aggressive mimicry.

This represents the first documented case of beetle-like mimicry reported in an Indian jumping spider.
