= Microbianor furcatus =

Scientific classification
- Kingdom: Animalia
- Phylum: Arthropoda
- Subphylum: Chelicerata
- Class: Arachnida
- Order: Araneae
- Infraorder: Araneomorphae
- Family: Salticidae
- Genus: Microbianor
- Species: M. furcatus

Binomial name
- Microbianor furcatus Haddad & Wesołowska 2013

Species of spider

Microbianor furcatus is a jumping spider species of the genus Microbianor that lives in South Africa. The male was first identified in 2013.
