= Bianor eximius =

Maputaland Bianor Jumping Spider

Scientific classification
- Kingdom: Animalia
- Phylum: Arthropoda
- Subphylum: Chelicerata
- Class: Arachnida
- Order: Araneae
- Infraorder: Araneomorphae
- Family: Salticidae
- Genus: Bianor
- Species: B. eximius

Binomial name
- Bianor eximius Wesołowska & Haddad, 2009

Species of spider

Bianor eximius is a species of spider in the family Salticidae. It is found in southern Africa and is commonly known as the Maputaland Bianor jumping spider.

== Distribution ==
Bianor eximius is found in Mozambique, South Africa and Zimbabwe. In South Africa, the species is recorded only from KwaZulu-Natal Province.

== Habitat and ecology ==
The species is rare and has been collected from leaf litter, grass tussocks and low shrubs at altitudes ranging from 47 to 405 m in the Savanna Biome.

== Conservation ==
Bianor eximius is listed as Least Concern due to its wide geographical range in southern Africa. In South Africa, it is protected in Ndumo Game Reserve, Ophathe Game Reserve and Tembe Elephant Park. There are no known threats to the species.
