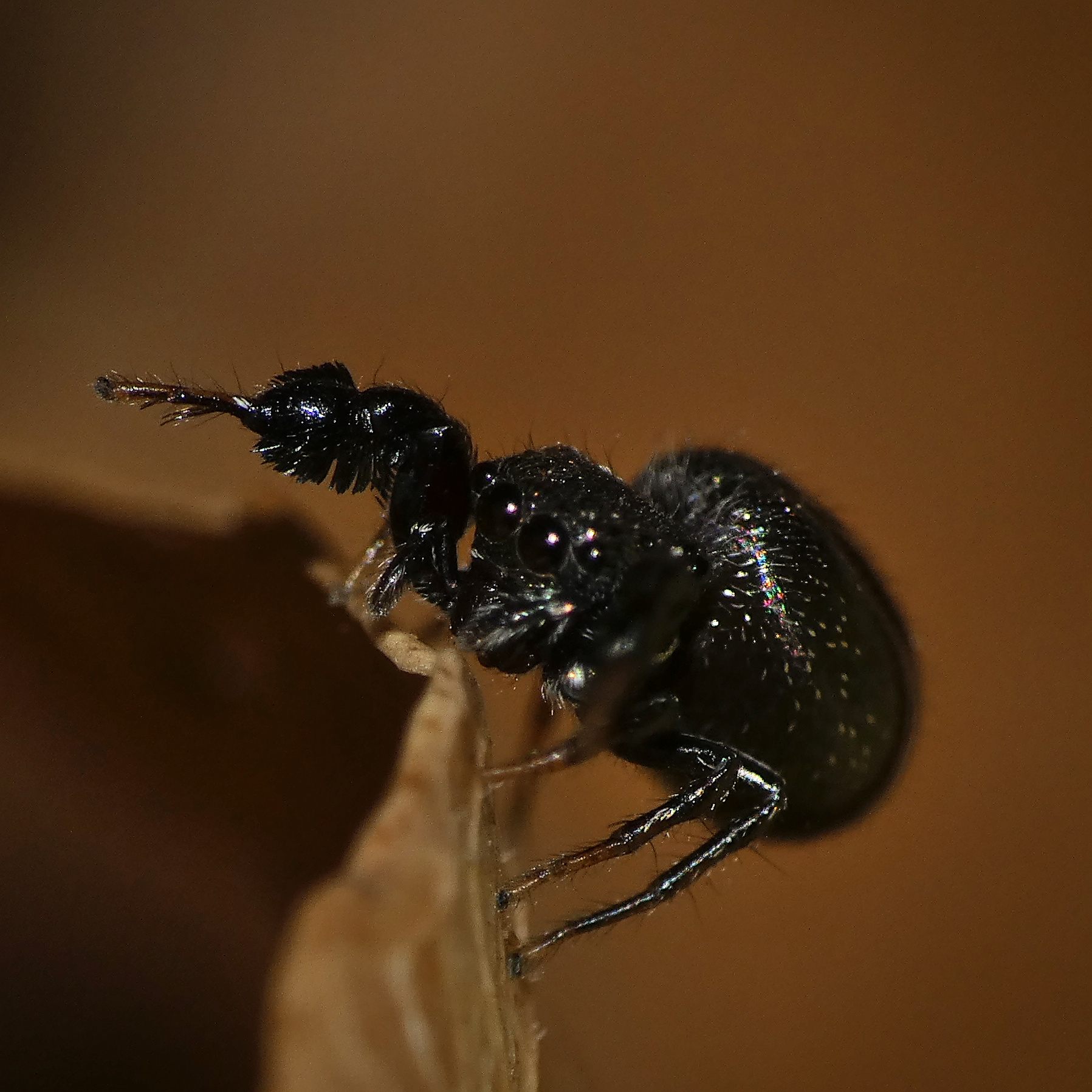

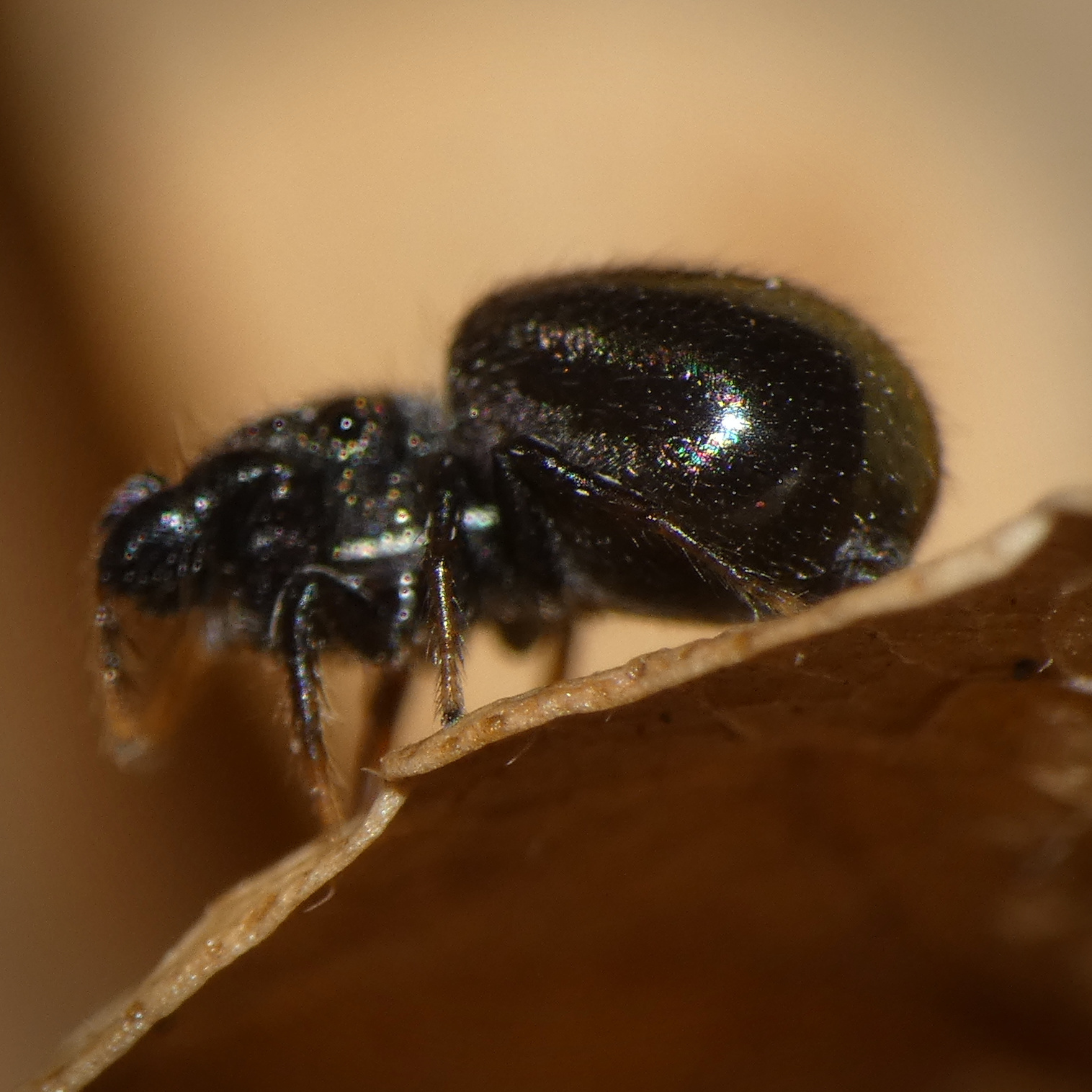

Scientific classification
- Kingdom: Animalia
- Phylum: Arthropoda
- Subphylum: Chelicerata
- Class: Arachnida
- Order: Araneae
- Infraorder: Araneomorphae
- Family: Salticidae
- Genus: Harmochirus
- Species: H. luculentus

Binomial name
- Harmochirus luculentus Simon, 1886

Synonyms
- Ballus brachiatus Thorell, 1877; Harmochirus malaccensis Simon, 1886; Harmochirus nervosus Thorell, 1890; Harmochirus brachiatus Simon, 1903; Harmochirus bruchiatus Barrion & Litsinger, 1994; Harmochirus insulanus Namkung, 2002

= Harmochirus luculentus =

Species of spider

Harmochirus luculentus is a species of jumping spider in the family Salticidae. It is found across multiple countries in Africa and is commonly known as the Tanzanian Harmochirus jumping spider.

== Distribution ==
Harmochirus luculentus has been recorded from Botswana, Congo Republic, Democratic Republic of the Congo, Ethiopia, Ivory Coast, Mozambique, Rwanda, South Africa, Tanzania, Yemen, and Zimbabwe.

In South Africa, the species is known from Eastern Cape, Gauteng, KwaZulu-Natal, Limpopo, North West, and Western Cape. Notable locations include Suikerbosrand Nature Reserve, Hluhluwe Nature Reserve, iSimangaliso Wetland Park, Ndumo Game Reserve, and Tembe Elephant Park.

== Habitat and ecology ==
The species is found on flowers, buds and leaves, especially their tips, and is occasionally found on walls and bark and once on the ground. The spiders run with legs I forward and the abdomen moves up and down constantly. Adults are present from August to February during the hot dry and hot wet seasons. The species is sampled from the Fynbos, Forest, Grassland, Indian Ocean Coastal Belt and Savanna biomes at altitudes ranging from 10 to 1602 m.

== Conservation ==
Harmochirus luculentus is listed as Least Concern by the South African National Biodiversity Institute due to its wide geographical range. The species is protected in several protected areas with no known threats.

== Taxonomy ==
The species was redescribed by Logunov in 2001. Both sexes are known.
