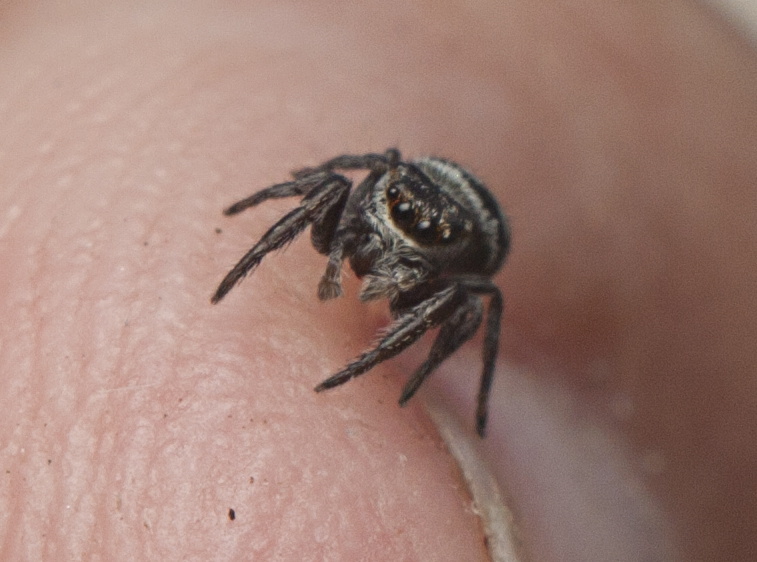

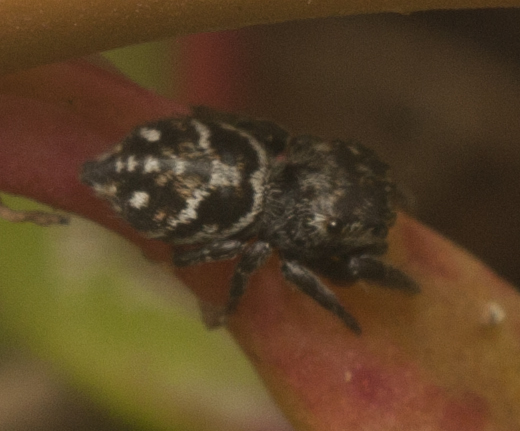

Scientific classification
- Kingdom: Animalia
- Phylum: Arthropoda
- Subphylum: Chelicerata
- Class: Arachnida
- Order: Araneae
- Infraorder: Araneomorphae
- Family: Salticidae
- Genus: Bianor
- Species: B. maculatus

Binomial name
- Bianor maculatus (Keyserling, 1883)

Synonyms
- Scythropa maculata Keyserling, 1883; Ericulus maculatus Simon, 1885

= Bianor maculatus =

Species of spider

Bianor compactus is a species of jumping spider that is endemic to Australia and introduced to New Zealand.

== Taxonomy ==
This species was described as Scythropa maculata in 1883 from female and male specimens. It was most recently revised in 2017.

== Description ==
The male is recorded at 5.18mm in length whereas the female is 4.70mm.

== Distribution ==
This species is endemic to Australia and introduced to New Zealand.

== Conservation status ==
Under the New Zealand Threat Classification System, this species is listed as "Introduced and Naturalised" with the qualifier of "Secure Overseas".
