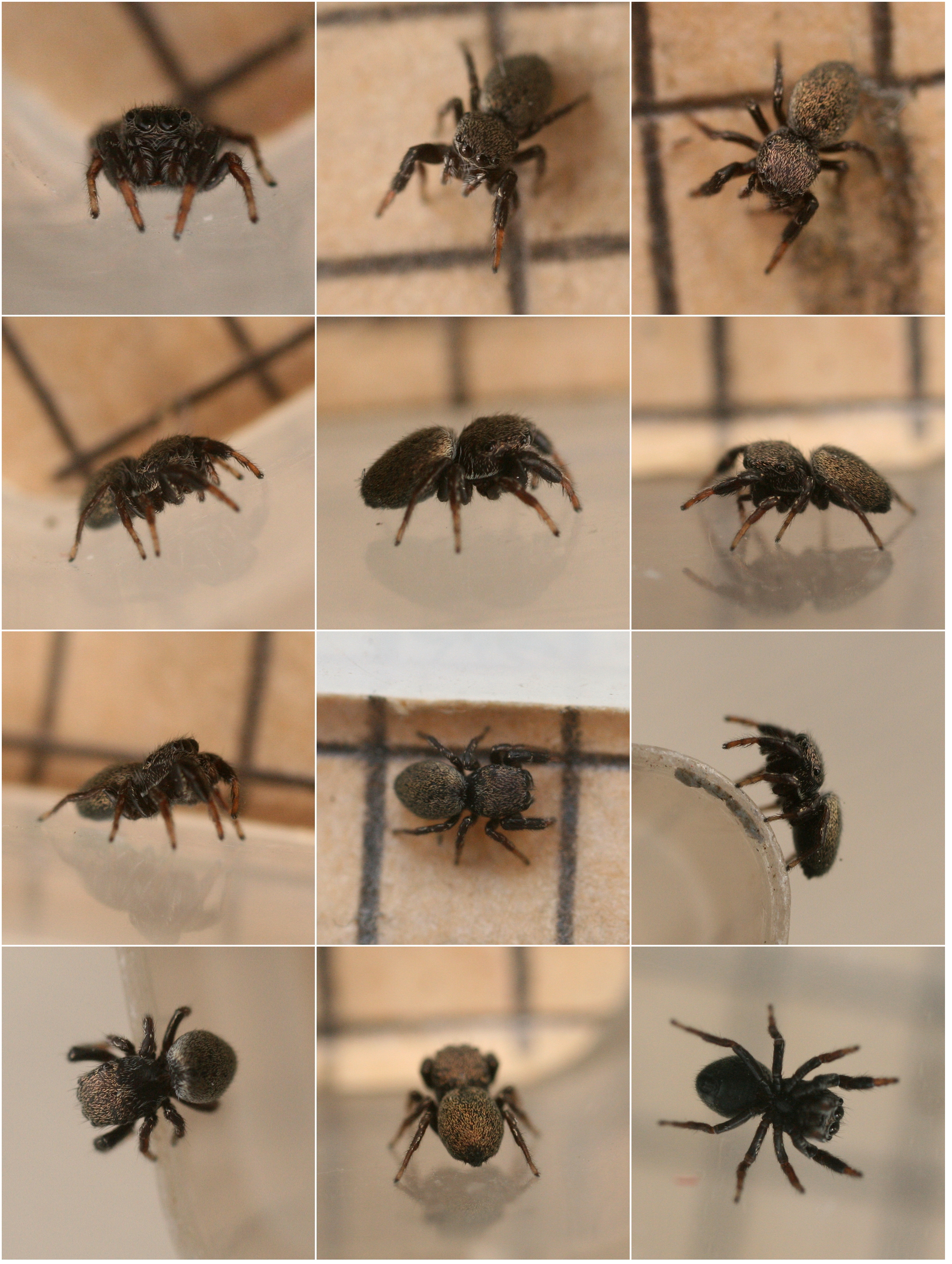

Scientific classification
- Kingdom: Animalia
- Phylum: Arthropoda
- Subphylum: Chelicerata
- Class: Arachnida
- Order: Araneae
- Infraorder: Araneomorphae
- Family: Salticidae
- Genus: Sibianor
- Species: S. aurocinctus

Binomial name
- Sibianor aurocinctus (Ohlert, 1865)

Synonyms
- Heliophanus aurocinctus; Attus aenescens; Ballus aenescens; Oedipus aenescens; Bianor aenescens; Bianor aurocinctus; Bianor inexploratus

= Sibianor aurocinctus =

Species of jumping spider

Sibianor aurocinctus is a species of jumping spider that can be found the Palearctic realm.

== Description ==
The species are blackish-red, and have four to eight eyes. Their females are approximately 3.2 millimetres (0.13 in) long.

== Distribution ==
It occurs in the Palearctic realm, including England, where it was discovered in Hertfordshire on 29 July 2012.

== Systematics ==
This species was known as Bianor aurocinctus until 2001.
