= Microbianor =

Scientific classification
- Kingdom: Animalia
- Phylum: Arthropoda
- Subphylum: Chelicerata
- Class: Arachnida
- Order: Araneae
- Infraorder: Araneomorphae
- Family: Salticidae
- Subfamily: Salticinae
- Genus: Microbianor; Logunov, 2000

Type species
- M. nigritarsus Logunov, 2000

Species
- 9, see text

Genus of spiders

Microbianor is a genus of African jumping spiders that was first described by D. V. Logunov in 2000. The name is derived from the Ancient Greek μικρός (micro), meaning "small", and the genus Bianor.

== Species ==
As of October 2025, this genus includes nine species:

- Microbianor deltshevi Logunov, 2009 – Madagascar
- Microbianor formosana Chen, Lin & Ueng, 2021 – Taiwan
- Microbianor furcatus Haddad & Wesołowska, 2013 – South Africa
- Microbianor globosus Haddad & Wesołowska, 2011 – South Africa
- Microbianor golovatchi Logunov, 2000 – Seychelles
- Microbianor madagascarensis Logunov, 2009 – Madagascar
- Microbianor nigritarsus Logunov, 2000 – Seychelles (type species)
- Microbianor saaristoi Logunov, 2000 – Seychelles, Réunion
- Microbianor simplex Wesołowska & Haddad, 2018 – South Africa
