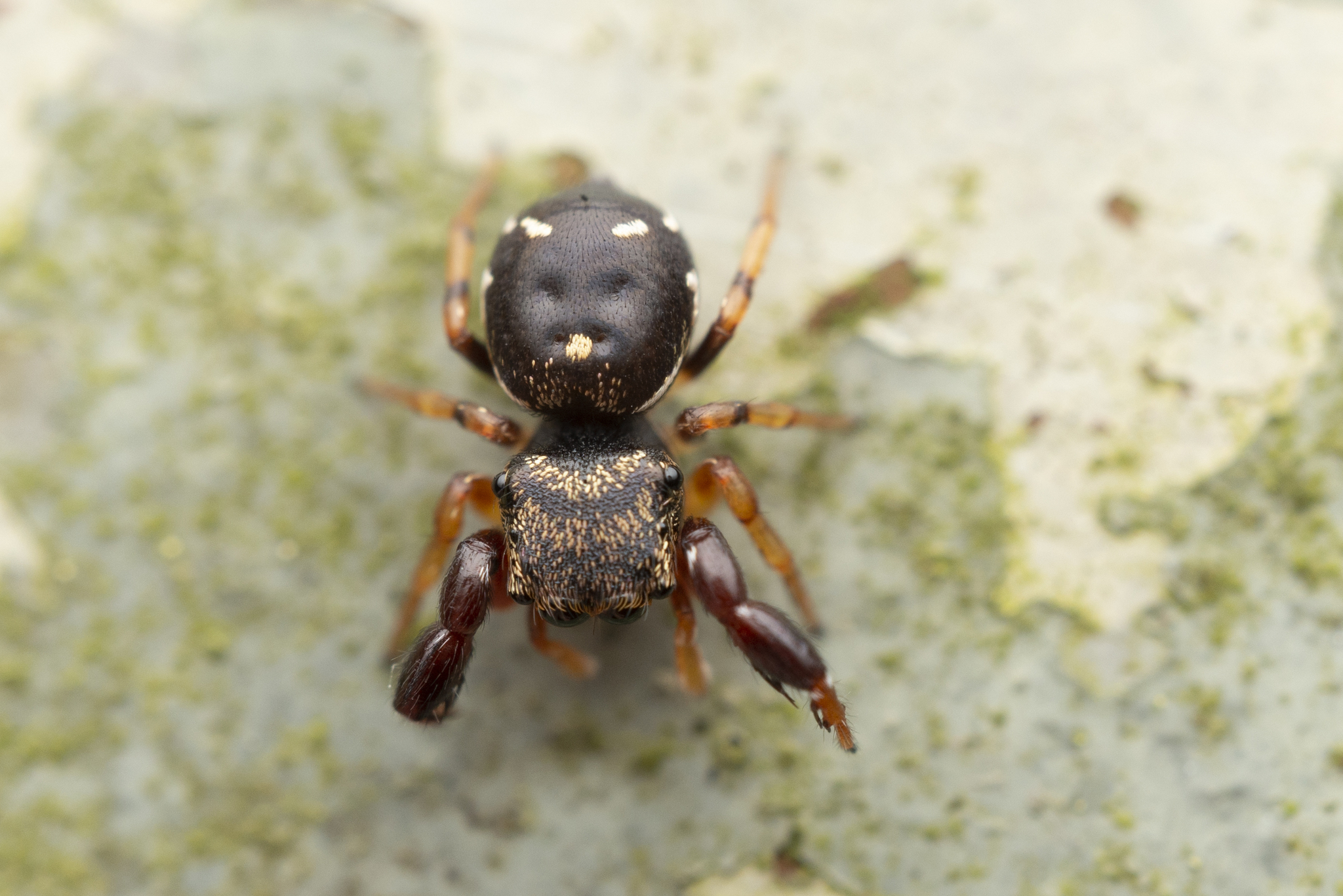
- H. insulanus
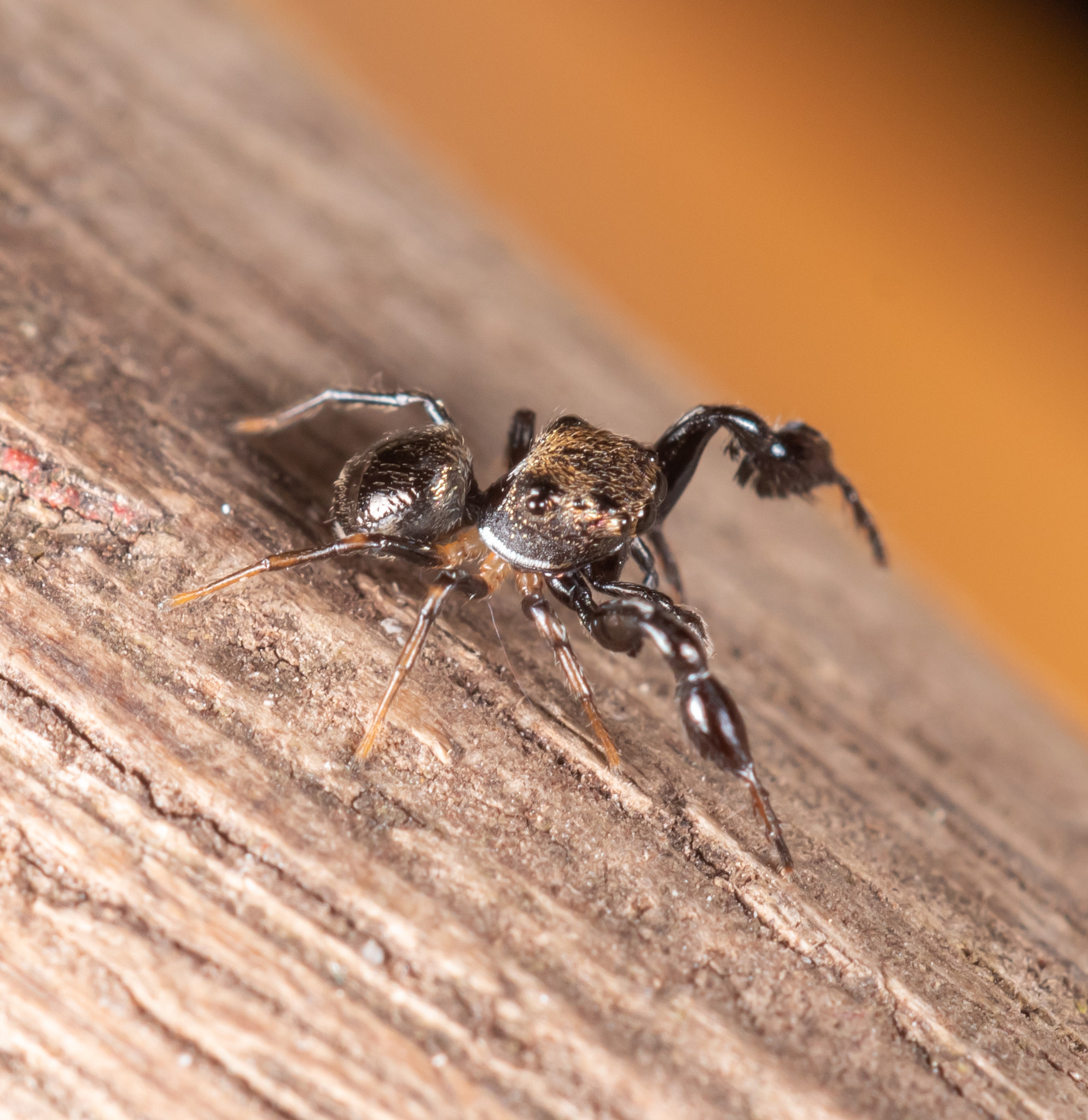
- H. brachiatus

Scientific classification
- Kingdom: Animalia
- Phylum: Arthropoda
- Subphylum: Chelicerata
- Class: Arachnida
- Order: Araneae
- Infraorder: Araneomorphae
- Family: Salticidae
- Subfamily: Salticinae
- Genus: Harmochirus; Simon, 1885

Type species
- Ballus brachiatus Thorell, 1877

Species
- See text.

Diversity
- 12 species

= Harmochirus =

Genus of spiders

Harmochirus is a genus of the spider family Salticidae (jumping spiders).

== Distribution ==
Nine of the described species are found in Asia from Pakistan to Japan and Indonesia. The remaining three live in different parts of Africa.

== Life style ==
H. brachiatus is found on flowers and buds, as well as on the tips of leaves. The spiders are also occasionally found on walls, bark and on the ground.

== Description ==
The carapace is somewhat cube shaped and fairly high, with a level cephalic region and almost vertical thorax and sides. The carapace is a broad oval, slightly longer than wide, and has a fairly wide, truncate posterior margin.

The abdomen is very broad, oval, and almost circular. Legs are long, and the femora, patellae, and tibiae of leg I are massive, while all the other segments are slender and shiny. There are fringes on the swollen segments of leg I, erect club shaped setae dorsally and ventrally on tibia I, and numerous spines are present ventrally on tibia and metatarsus I.

== Taxonomy ==
This small genus is very close to Bianor; it seems to replace it where Bianor itself is missing, especially in rainforest habitats.

== Species ==
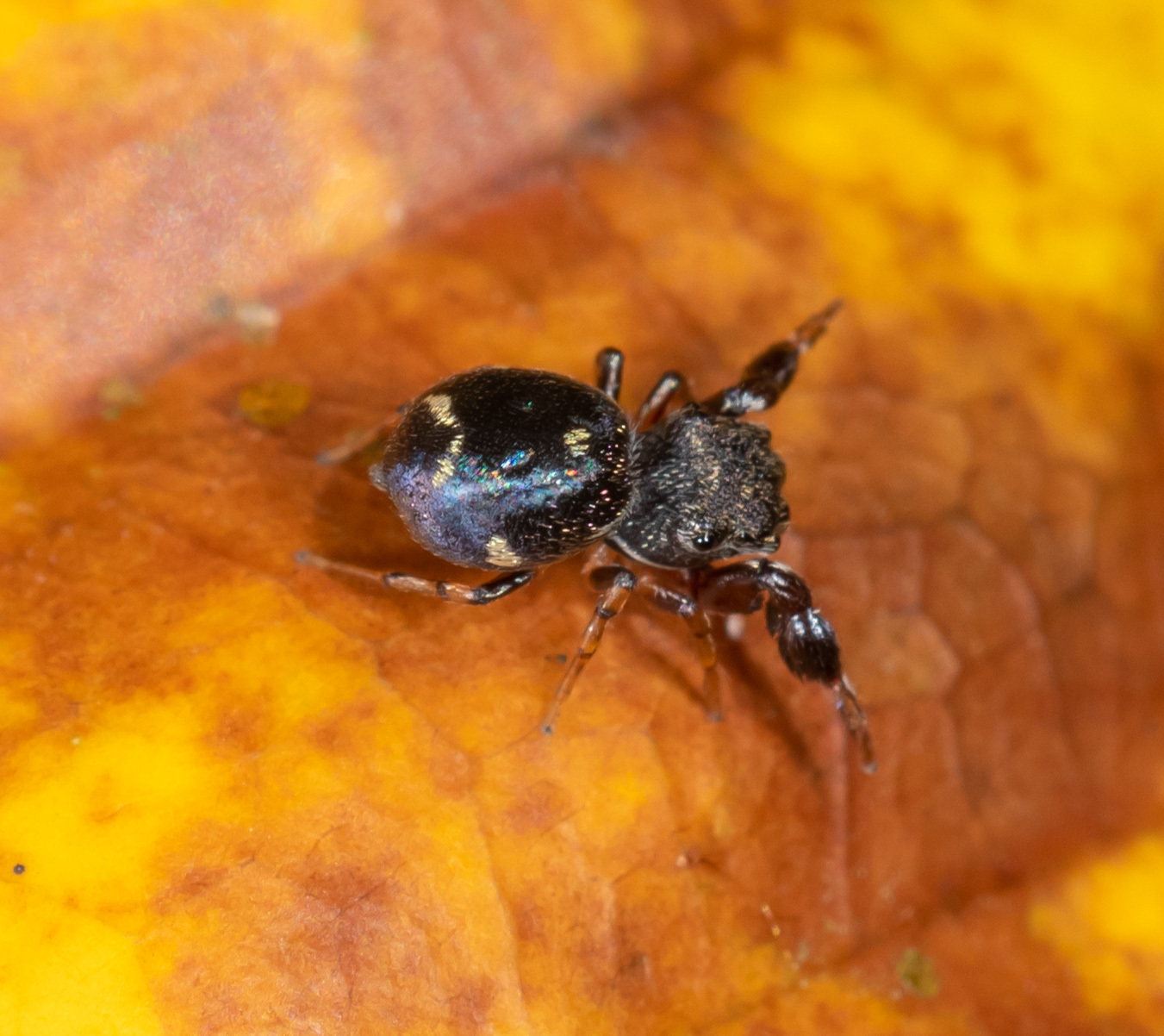
female H. brachiatus

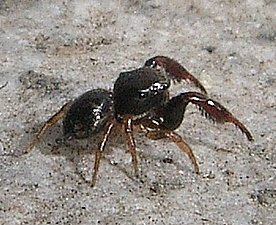
H. insulanus

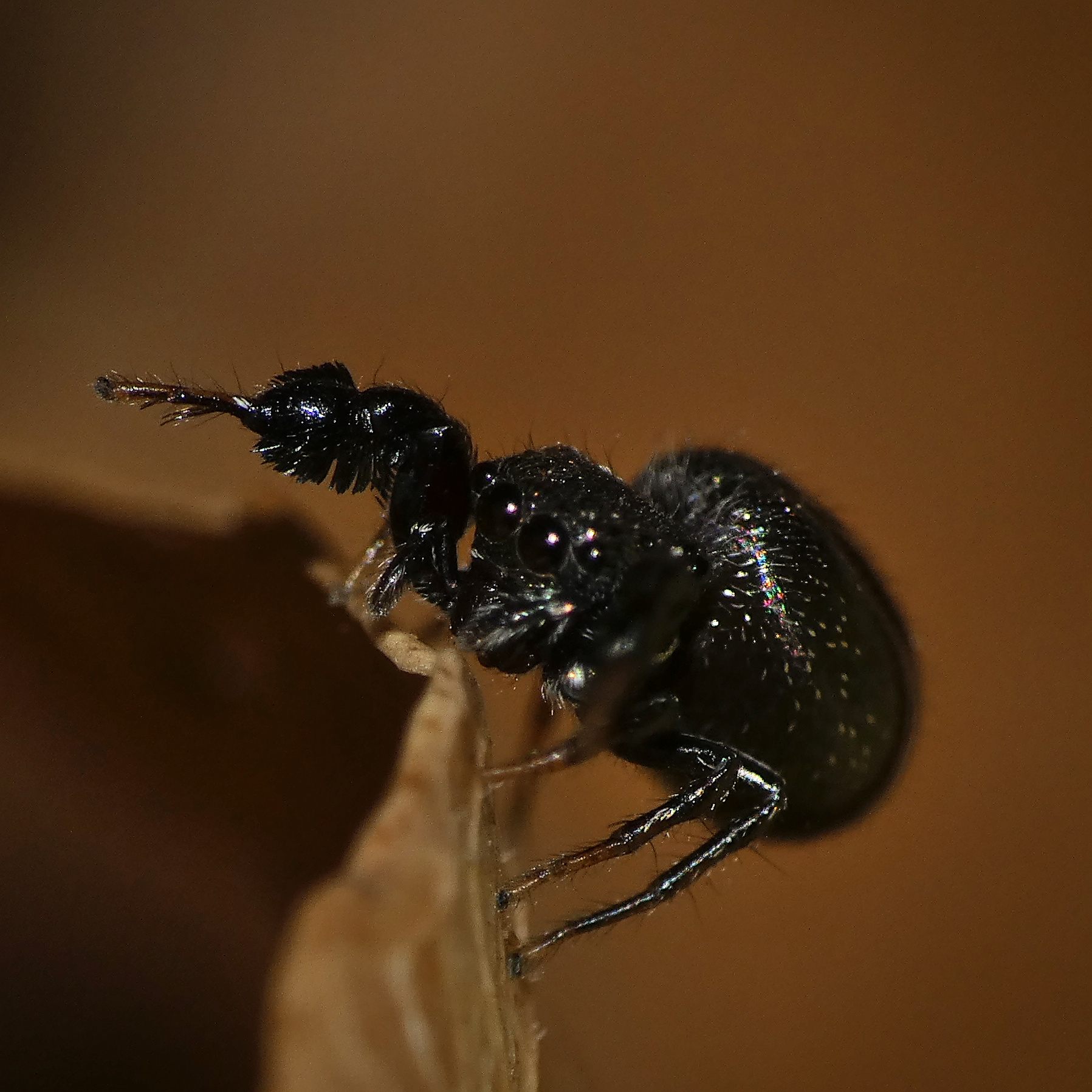
H. luculentus

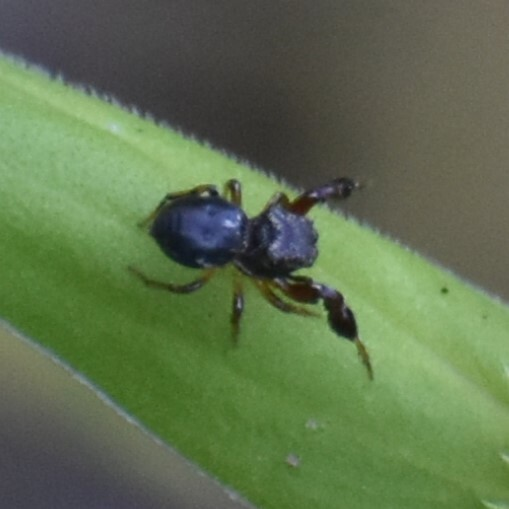
H. zabkai

As of October 2025, this genus includes twelve species:

- Harmochirus ahmedi Biswas, 2016 – Bangladesh
- Harmochirus bianoriformis (Strand, 1907) – Central, East Africa, Madagascar
- Harmochirus brachiatus (Thorell, 1877) – India, Bhutan, Bangladesh, China, Taiwan, Korea, Thailand, Vietnam, Malaysia, Indonesia (type species)
- Harmochirus duboscqi (Berland & Millot, 1941) – Ivory Coast, Senegal
- Harmochirus exaggeratus Caleb & Mathai, 2015 – India
- Harmochirus insulanus (Kishida, 1914) – China, Korea, Japan, Vietnam
- Harmochirus lloydi Narayan, 1915 – India
- Harmochirus luculentus Simon, 1886 – Sub-Saharan Africa, Zanzibar, Yemen
- Harmochirus maijdiensis Biswas, 2024 – Bangladesh
- Harmochirus pineus Xiao & Wang, 2005 – China
- Harmochirus tikaderi Biswas & Raychaudhuri, 2019 – Bangladesh
- Harmochirus zabkai Logunov, 2001 – Pakistan, India, Sri Lanka, Nepal, Laos, Vietnam
