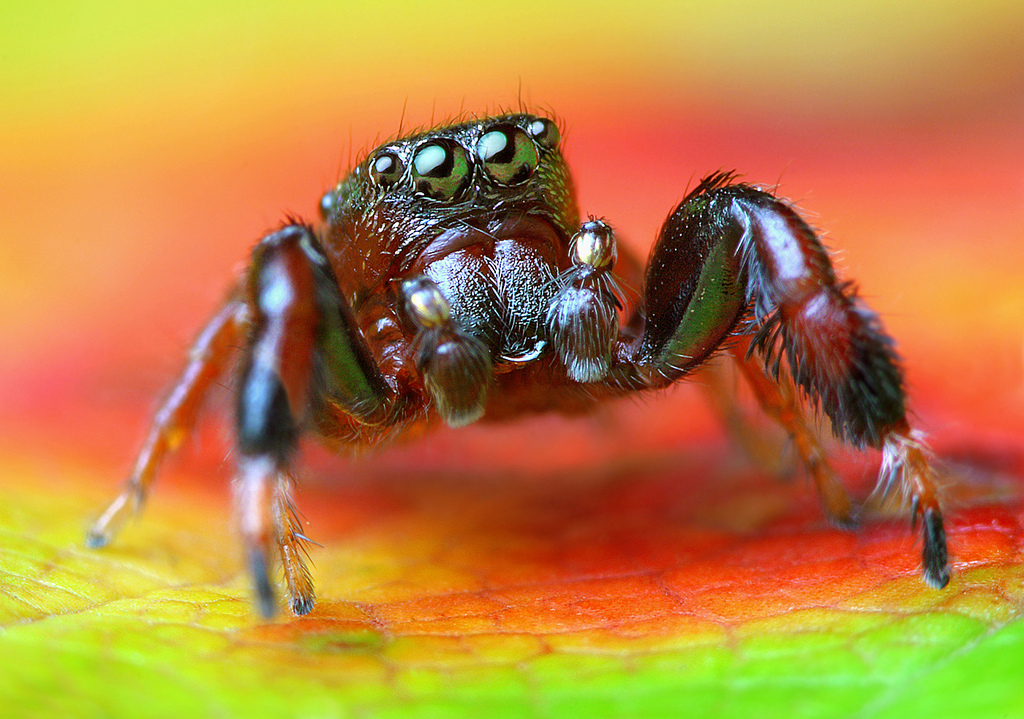
- male Sibianor larae
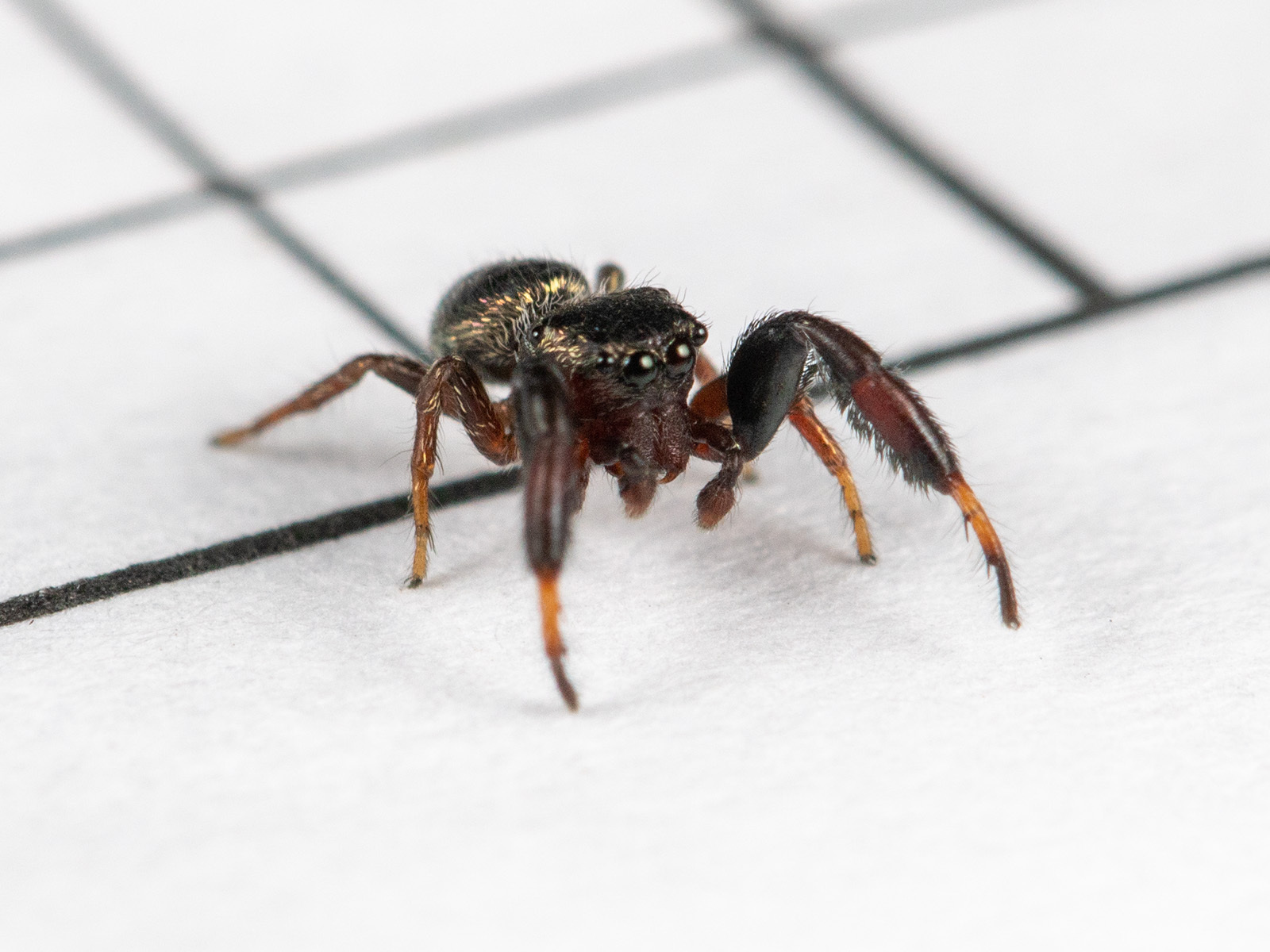
- S. turkestanicus

Scientific classification
- Kingdom: Animalia
- Phylum: Arthropoda
- Subphylum: Chelicerata
- Class: Arachnida
- Order: Araneae
- Infraorder: Araneomorphae
- Family: Salticidae
- Subfamily: Salticinae
- Genus: Sibianor; Logunov, 2001

Type species
- S. aurocinctus (Ohlert, 1865)

Species
- 17, see text

= Sibianor =

Genus of spiders

Sibianor is a genus of jumping spiders that was first described by Dmitri V. Logunov in 2001. They are closely related to Bianor.

== Distribution ==
Sibianor are found in Europe, Asia, Africa, Canada, and the United States:

== Species ==
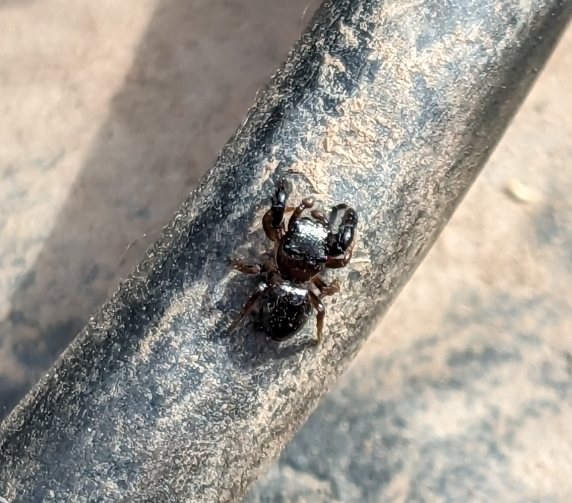
S. aemulus

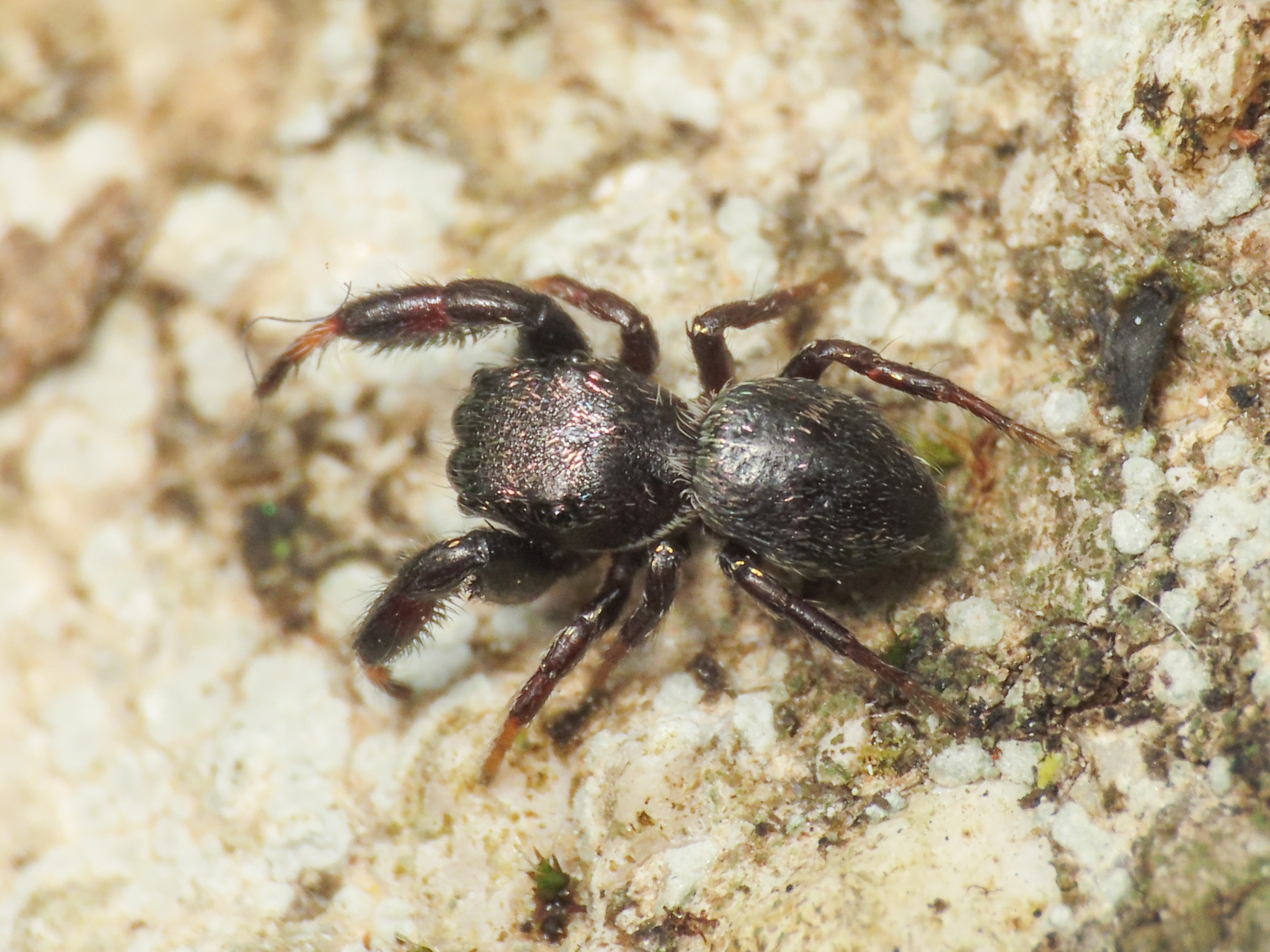
S. aurocinctus

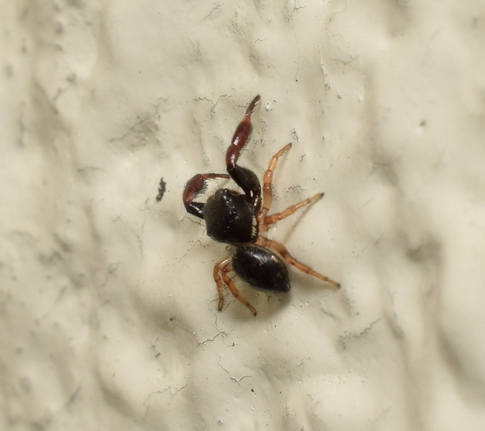
S. pullus

As of October 2025, this genus includes seventeen species:

- Sibianor aemulus (Gertsch, 1934) – Russia (North-east Siberia), Canada, United States
- Sibianor anansii Logunov, 2009 – Botswana
- Sibianor annae Logunov, 2001 – China
- Sibianor aurocinctus (Ohlert, 1865) – Europe, Turkey, Caucasus, Russia (Europe to South Siberia), Iran, Kazakhstan, China, Korea, Japan (type species)
- Sibianor caucasicus Logunov, 2024 – Russia (Caucasus)
- Sibianor japonicus (Logunov, Ikeda & Ono, 1997) – Russia (Far East), Japan
- Sibianor kenyaensis Logunov, 2001 – Botswana, Kenya
- Sibianor kochiensis (Bohdanowicz & Prószyński, 1987) – Japan
- Sibianor larae Logunov, 2001 – Europe, Russia (Europe to Far East)
- Sibianor latens (Logunov, 1991) – Russia (South Siberia to Far East), China
- Sibianor nigriculus (Logunov & Wesołowska, 1992) – Russia (Far East), Korea, Japan
- Sibianor proszynski (Zhu & Song, 2001) – China
- Sibianor pullus (Bösenberg & Strand, 1906) – Russia (Far East), Korea, Japan, China, Taiwan
- Sibianor stepposus (Logunov, 1991) – Russia (Middle to South Siberia), Kazakhstan
- Sibianor tantulus (Simon, 1868) – Europe, Russia (Europe to Far East), Georgia, Mongolia
- Sibianor turkestanicus Logunov, 2001 – Georgia, Azerbaijan, Kyrgyzstan
- Sibianor victoriae Logunov, 2001 – Kenya, South Africa
