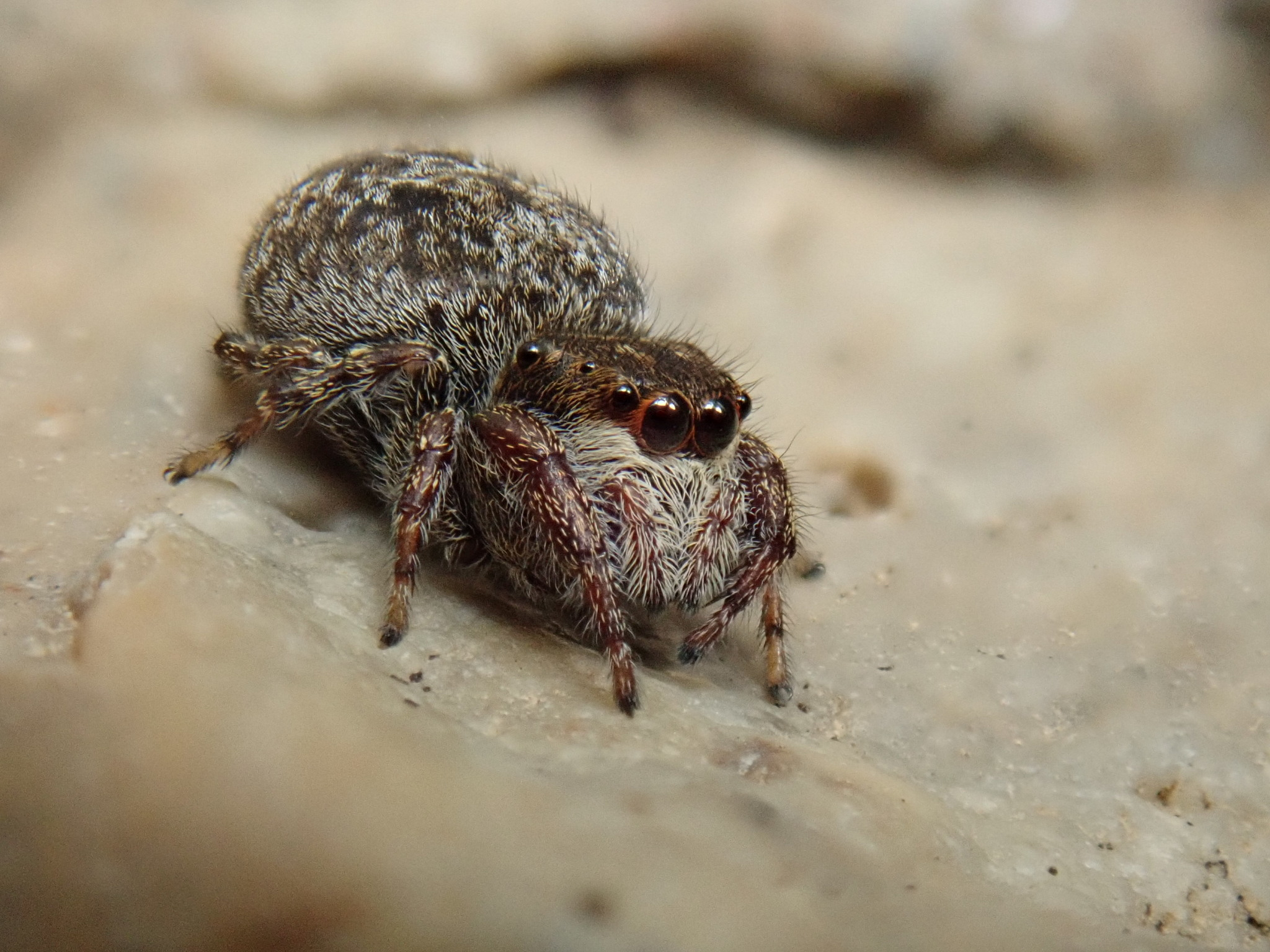
- female B. albobimaculatus
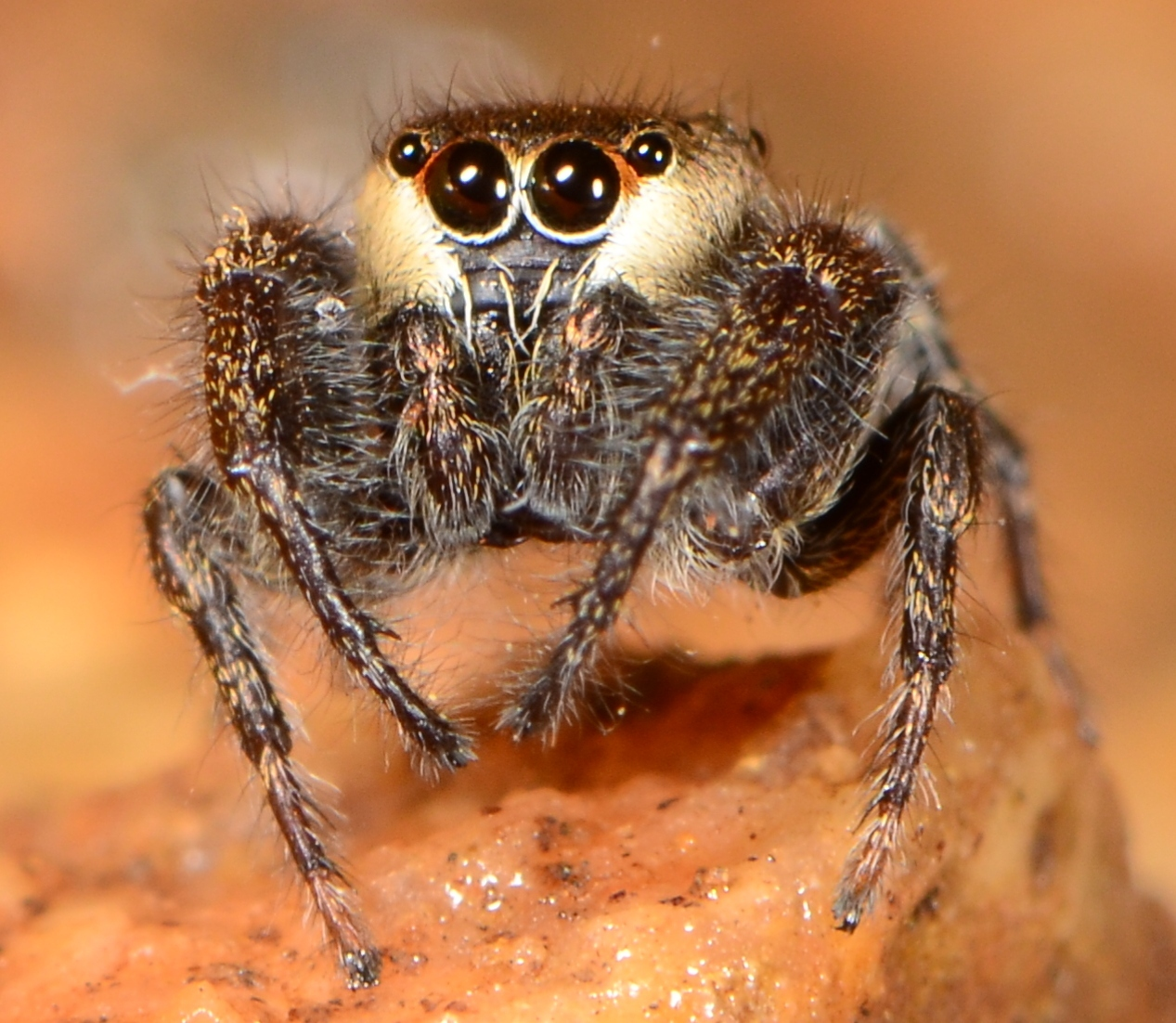
- male B. albobimaculatus

Scientific classification
- Kingdom: Animalia
- Phylum: Arthropoda
- Subphylum: Chelicerata
- Class: Arachnida
- Order: Araneae
- Infraorder: Araneomorphae
- Family: Salticidae
- Subfamily: Salticinae
- Genus: Bianor; Peckham & Peckham, 1886

Type species
- B. maculatus (Keyserling, 1883)

Species
- 27, see text

Synonyms
- Stichius

= Bianor =

Genus of spiders

Bianor is a genus of boreal jumping spiders that can grow to 3 and 4 mm (0.12 and 0.16 in). The robust shiny body and northerly distribution are distinctive. Males can be easily recognized by his swollen forelegs and females have orange legs. It was first described by George and Elizabeth Peckham in 1886, who presumably named it after the mythical character Bianor (=Ocnus).

== Distribution ==
Bianor is a mainly Asian genus. Some species are found in Africa and Oceania, with two species endemic to Brazil.

== Life style ==
These are free-living plant-dwellers. Specimens were sampled at ground level at the base of plants but also from tall trees.

== Description ==
Bianor are small to medium-sized spiders ranging from 2 to 7 mm. The colour and patterns vary between species.

Typically, the carapace is dark brown with some white hairs on the posterior and lateral surfaces. The abdomen is light brown and sometimes bears two or three pairs of large circular tufts of light-coloured hairs. The carapace is moderately high, flat on top, with the thorax sloping steadily towards the posterior margin and with very steep sides. It is a little longer than wide, with rounded sides, equally contracted before and behind, high and convex, not wider than the dorsal row of eyes. The abdomen is oval, not as wide as the carapace, and slightly pointed at the rear.

The legs are sturdy and not particularly long, with all about the same length. The femora, patellae and tibiae of legs I are swollen and much more robust than all the other segments. There are ventral spines on tibiae I and metatarsi I and a few more elsewhere.

== Taxonomy ==
The genus was revised by Logunov in 2001, during which the new genus Sibianor was erected.

== Species ==
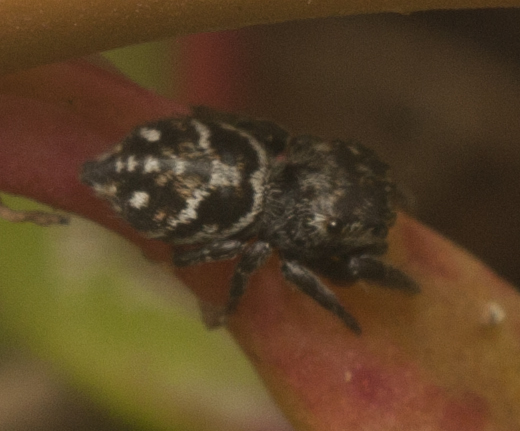
B. maculatus

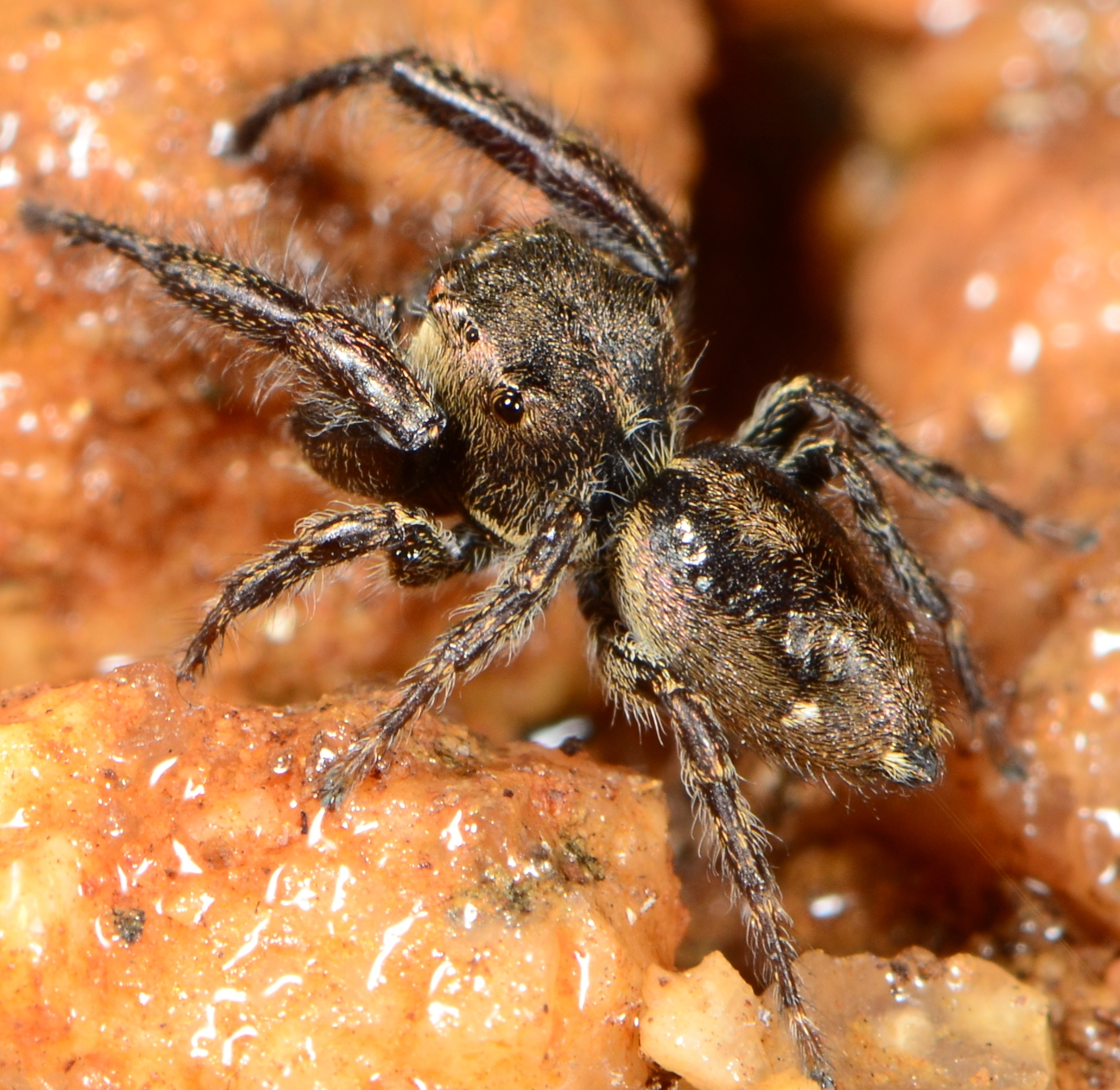
male B. albobimaculatus

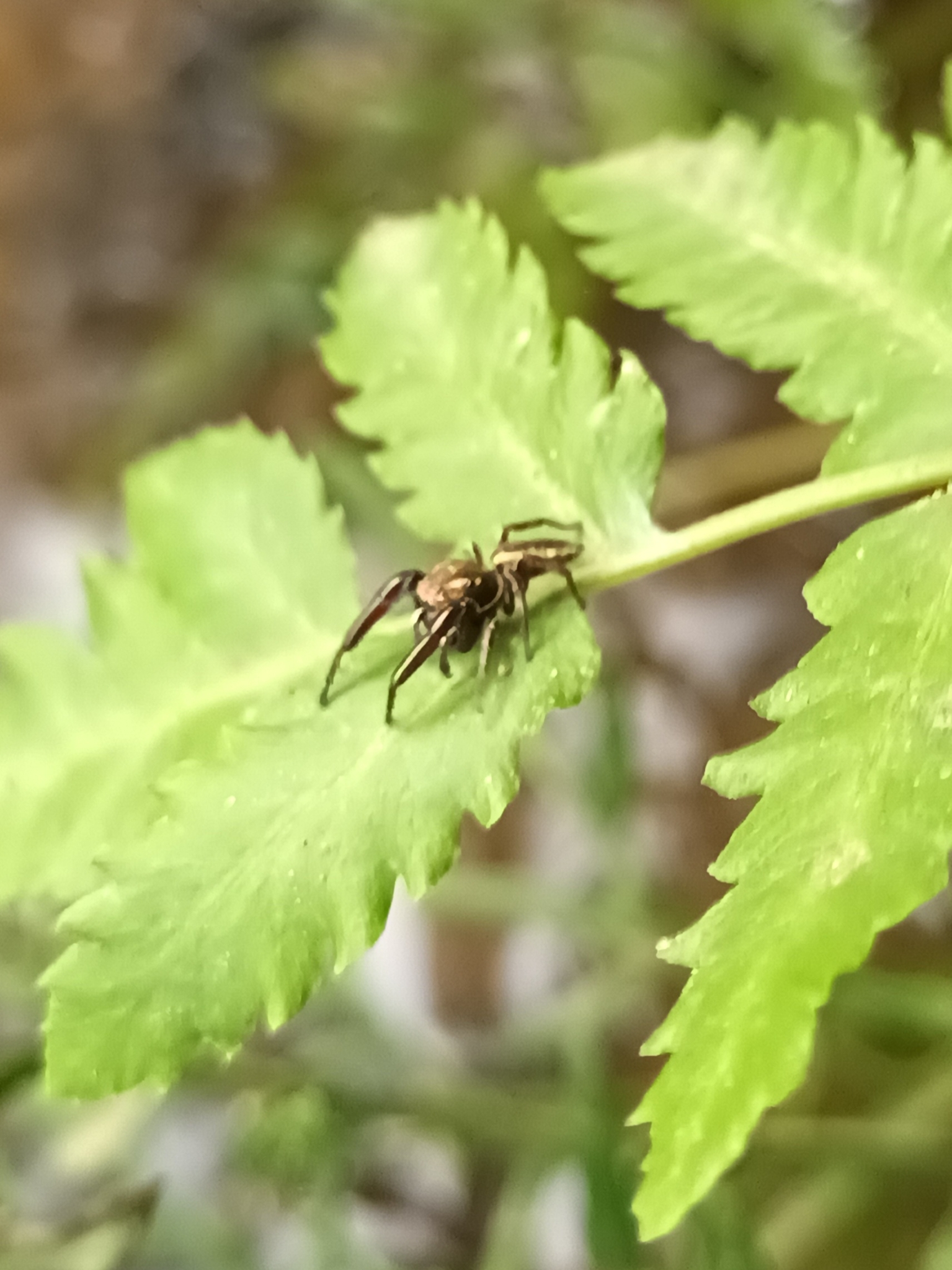
B. angulosus

As of October 2025, this genus includes 27 species:

- Bianor albobimaculatus (Lucas, 1846) – Africa, Mediterranean to Russia (Europe), Georgia, Azerbaijan, Kazakhstan, Iran, Central Asia, Afghanistan, Pakistan, India, Nepal
- Bianor angulosus (Karsch, 1879) – India, Sri Lanka, Bhutan, Bangladesh, China, Taiwan, Myanmar, Vietnam, Thailand, Malaysia, Indonesia
- Bianor balius Thorell, 1890 – India, Sri Lanka, Bhutan, China, Japan, Thailand, Cambodia, Malaysia, Indonesia, Kiribati (Caroline Is.)
- Bianor biguttatus Wesołowska & van Harten, 2002 – Yemen (Socotra)
- Bianor biocellosus Simon, 1902 – Brazil
- Bianor compactus (Urquhart, 1885) – New Zealand
- Bianor concolor (Keyserling, 1882) – Australia (New South Wales)
- Bianor diversipes Simon, 1901 – Malaysia (peninsula)
- Bianor eximius Wesołowska & Haddad, 2009 – Zimbabwe, Mozambique, South Africa
- Bianor fasciatus Mello-Leitão, 1922 – Brazil
- Bianor hongkong Song, Xie, Zhu & Wu, 1997 – China
- Bianor kovaczi Logunov, 2001 – Ivory Coast, Ethiopia, Botswana
- Bianor maculatus (Keyserling, 1883) – Australia, New Zealand (type species)
- Bianor monster Żabka, 1985 – Vietnam
- Bianor murphyi Logunov, 2001 – Kenya
- Bianor narmadaensis (Tikader, 1975) – India, Bangladesh
- Bianor nexilis Jastrzebski, 2007 – Bhutan
- Bianor pashanensis (Tikader, 1975) – India, Bangladesh
- Bianor paulyi Logunov, 2009 – Madagascar, Comoros
- Bianor pseudomaculatus Logunov, 2001 – India, Bhutan, Cambodia, Vietnam
- Bianor punjabicus Logunov, 2001 – Afghanistan, Pakistan, India
- Bianor quadrimaculatus (Lawrence, 1927) – Angola
- Bianor senegalensis Logunov, 2001 – Senegal
- Bianor simplex (Blackwall, 1865) – Cape Verde
- Bianor tortus Jastrzebski, 2007 – India, Nepal
- Bianor vitiensis Berry, Beatty & Prószyński, 1996 – Fiji
- Bianor wunderlichi Logunov, 2001 – Canary Islands, Azores
