= Orientattus =

Scientific classification
- Kingdom: Animalia
- Phylum: Arthropoda
- Subphylum: Chelicerata
- Class: Arachnida
- Order: Araneae
- Infraorder: Araneomorphae
- Family: Salticidae
- Subfamily: Salticinae
- Genus: Orientattus; Caleb, 2020

Type species
- Schenkelia aurantia (Kanesharatnam & Benjamin, 2018)

Species
- 4, see text

Genus of jumping spiders

Orientattus is a genus of Asian jumping spiders erected by John Caleb in 2020. It is placed in the tribe Plexippini, within the Salticoida clade of Salticinae. In 2018 and 2019, a species found in Sri Lanka and India was placed in the otherwise African genus Schenkelia under the name "Schenkelia aurantia", however, this species differed significantly from the type species of the genus Schenkelia. Three other species, placed in different genera, were found to resemble Schenkelia aurantia, and these were all combined to create the genus, Orientattus.

Compared to related genera, Orientattus species are distinguished by features of both the male and female genitalia. The male palpal bulb is rounded with a short curved embolus and is borne on a pedipalp with a bifurcated retrolateral tibial apophysis (RTA). Females have C-shaped copulatory openings, no copulatory ducts and double-chambered spermathecae with a large anterior chamber and a smaller posterior chamber. There are also two large 'pockets' on the sides of the posterior border of the epigyne.

== Species ==
As of March 2022 it contains four species:

- O. aurantius (Kanesharatnam & Benjamin, 2018) (type) – India, Sri Lanka
- O. bicuspidatus (Peng & Li, 2003) – Vietnam
- O. hongkong (Song, Xie, Zhu & Wu, 1997) – Hong Kong
- O. minutus (Żabka, 1985) – China, Nepal, Vietnam

== See also ==
- Pancorius
- Schenkelia
- List of Salticidae genera
