= Grayenulla =

Scientific classification
- Kingdom: Animalia
- Phylum: Arthropoda
- Subphylum: Chelicerata
- Class: Arachnida
- Order: Araneae
- Infraorder: Araneomorphae
- Family: Salticidae
- Subfamily: Salticinae
- Tribe: incertae sedis
- Genus: Grayenulla; Zabka, 1992

Type species
- Grayenulla dejongi Zabka, 1992

Species
- 7, see text

Genus of spiders

Grayenulla is a genus of Australian jumping spiders that was first described by Marek Michał Żabka in 1992.

The generic name honours Michael R. Gray.

== Species ==
As of June 2019 it contains seven species, found only in Queensland, New South Wales, and Western Australia:

- Grayenulla australensis Zabka, 1992 – Australia (Western Australia)
- Grayenulla dejongi Zabka, 1992 (type) – Australia (Western Australia)
- Grayenulla nova Zabka, 1992 – Australia (Western Australia)
- Grayenulla spinimana Zabka & Gray, 2002 – Australia (Western Australia)
- Grayenulla waldockae Zabka, 1992 – Australia (Western Australia)
- Grayenulla wilganea Zabka & Gray, 2002 – Australia (New South Wales)
- Grayenulla wishartorum Zabka, 1992 – Australia (Queensland)
