= Paraplatoides =

Scientific classification
- Kingdom: Animalia
- Phylum: Arthropoda
- Subphylum: Chelicerata
- Class: Arachnida
- Order: Araneae
- Infraorder: Araneomorphae
- Family: Salticidae
- Subfamily: Salticinae
- Genus: Paraplatoides; Zabka, 1992

Type species
- P. tenerrimus (L. Koch, 1879)

Species
- 7, see text

Genus of spiders

Paraplatoides is a genus of South Pacific jumping spiders that was first described by Marek Michał Żabka in 1992.

== Species ==
As of August 2019 it contains seven species, found only in Australia and on New Caledonia:

- Paraplatoides caledonicus (Berland, 1932) – New Caledonia
- Paraplatoides christopheri Zabka, 1992 – Australia (Queensland)
- Paraplatoides darwini Waldock, 2009 – Australia (Western Australia)
- Paraplatoides hirsti Zabka, 1992 – Australia (South Australia)
- Paraplatoides longulus Zabka, 1992 – Australia (Queensland)
- Paraplatoides niger Zabka, 1992 – Australia (New South Wales to Tasmania)
- Paraplatoides tenerrimus (L. Koch, 1879) (type) – Australia (Queensland)
