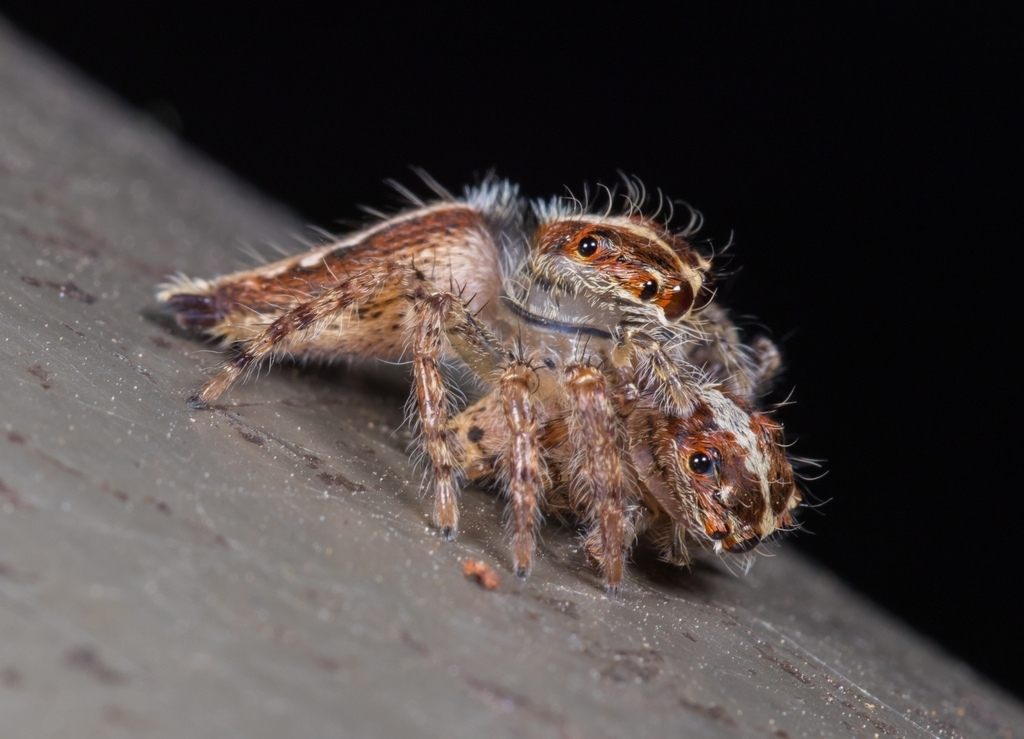
- Cannibalistic P. crassipes in Hong Kong

Scientific classification
- Kingdom: Animalia
- Phylum: Arthropoda
- Subphylum: Chelicerata
- Class: Arachnida
- Order: Araneae
- Infraorder: Araneomorphae
- Family: Salticidae
- Genus: Pancorius
- Species: P. crassipes

Binomial name
- Pancorius crassipes (Karsch, 1881)

= Pancorius crassipes =

Species of jumping spider

Pancorius crassipes is a species of jumping spider found from Thailand to Japan. Originally described as Plexippus crassipes by Ferdinand Karsch in 1881, the species was later transferred to the genus Evarcha before being placed in its current genus Pancorius in 2001.

== Distribution ==
Pancorius crassipes is widely distributed across Eastern and Southeastern Asia, with confirmed records from China (including Taiwan), Japan, South Korea, and Vietnam. The species has also been reported from Poland, though this may represent a recent introduction rather than an established population.

== Taxonomy ==
The species has undergone several taxonomic changes since its original description. Karsch first described it as Plexippus crassipes in 1881. In 1971, Jerzy Prószyński and Wanda Staręga transferred the species to the genus Evarcha, where it remained until Logunov and Marusik moved it to Pancorius in 2001.

The transfer to Pancorius was based on several diagnostic characters that distinguish this species from typical Evarcha species, including its large elongated body, densely haired body and legs, relatively long spinnerets, and the presence of a hair pencil beneath the palpal median apophysis in males.

== Description ==
Pancorius crassipes is a relatively large jumping spider. Males measure 10–11 mm in total body length, while females are slightly larger at 12–13 mm. The species has a robust, elongated body that is densely covered in hair, giving it a distinctly hairy appearance compared to many other jumping spiders.

The carapace is dark brown to black with a distinctive pale stripe running down the center. The legs are relatively thick and robust, which is reflected in the species name "crassipes" meaning "thick-footed". The abdomen shows various patterns of brown and pale markings that can vary between individuals.
