= Adoxotoma bargo =

Scientific classification
- Kingdom: Animalia
- Phylum: Arthropoda
- Subphylum: Chelicerata
- Class: Arachnida
- Order: Araneae
- Infraorder: Araneomorphae
- Family: Salticidae
- Genus: Adoxotoma
- Species: A. bargo

Binomial name
- Adoxotoma bargo Zabka, 2001

Species of spider

Adoxotoma bargo is a jumping spider in the Salticidae family, which is found in New South Wales.

It was described by Marek Michał Żabka in 2001, from a male specimen found in wet sclerophyll forest, under rocks, near Pheasants Nest Bridge, out of Bargo (whence the epithet).
