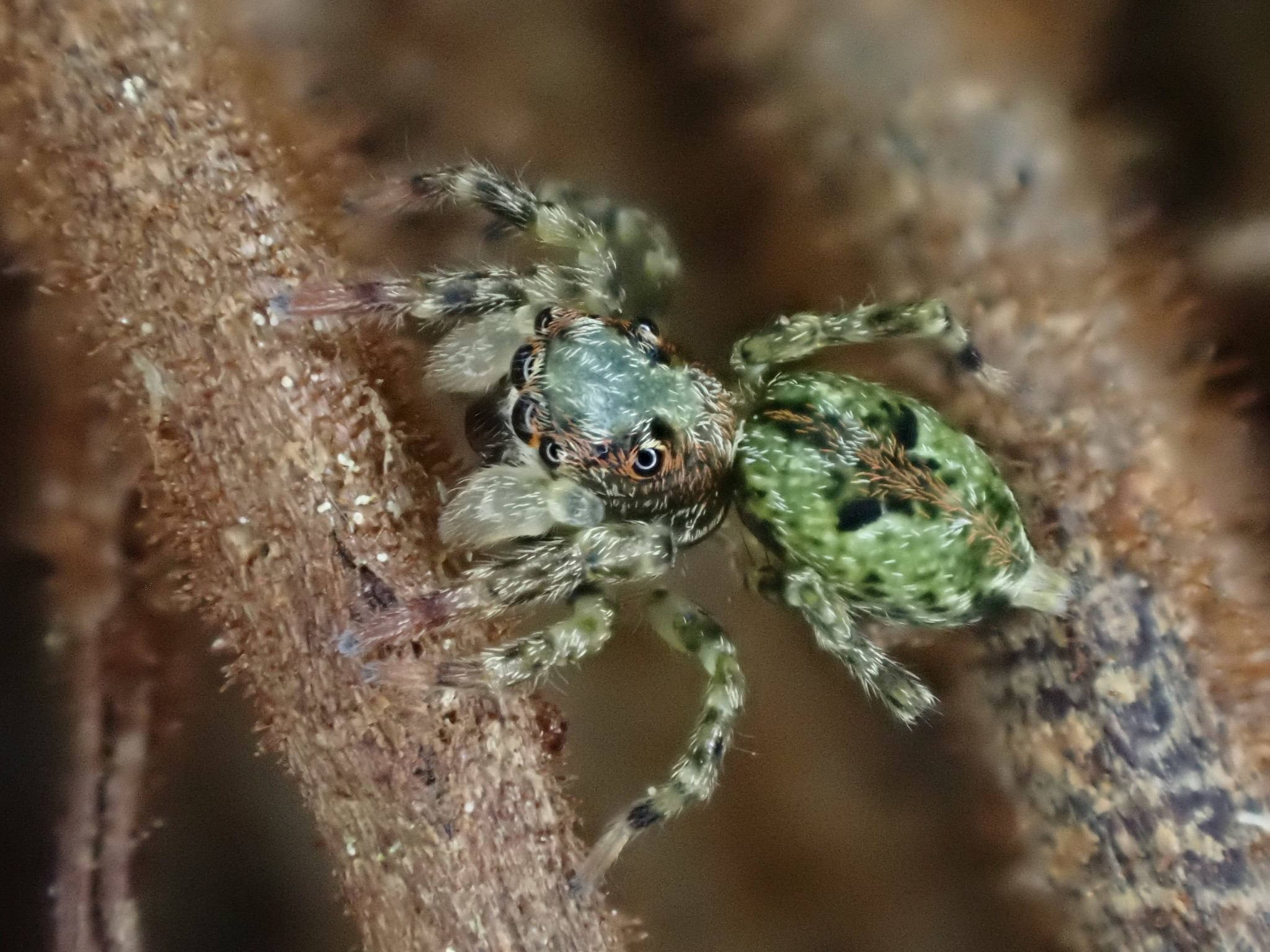

Conservation status
- Not Threatened (NZ TCS)

Scientific classification
- Kingdom: Animalia
- Phylum: Arthropoda
- Subphylum: Chelicerata
- Class: Arachnida
- Order: Araneae
- Infraorder: Araneomorphae
- Family: Salticidae
- Genus: Hinewaia
- Species: H. embolica

Binomial name
- Hinewaia embolica Zabka & Pollard, 2002

= Hinewaia =

Genus of spiders

Hinewaia is a genus of the jumping spiders found in New Zealand. Its single described species is Hinewaia embolica.

== Taxonomy ==
This species was described in 2002 by Marek Zabka and Simon Pollard. The holotype is stored in Otago Museum.

== Description ==
The body is around 4mm long. This species is predominately green coloured with a camouflage pattern. The abdomen has a distinctive brown cross marking dorsally.

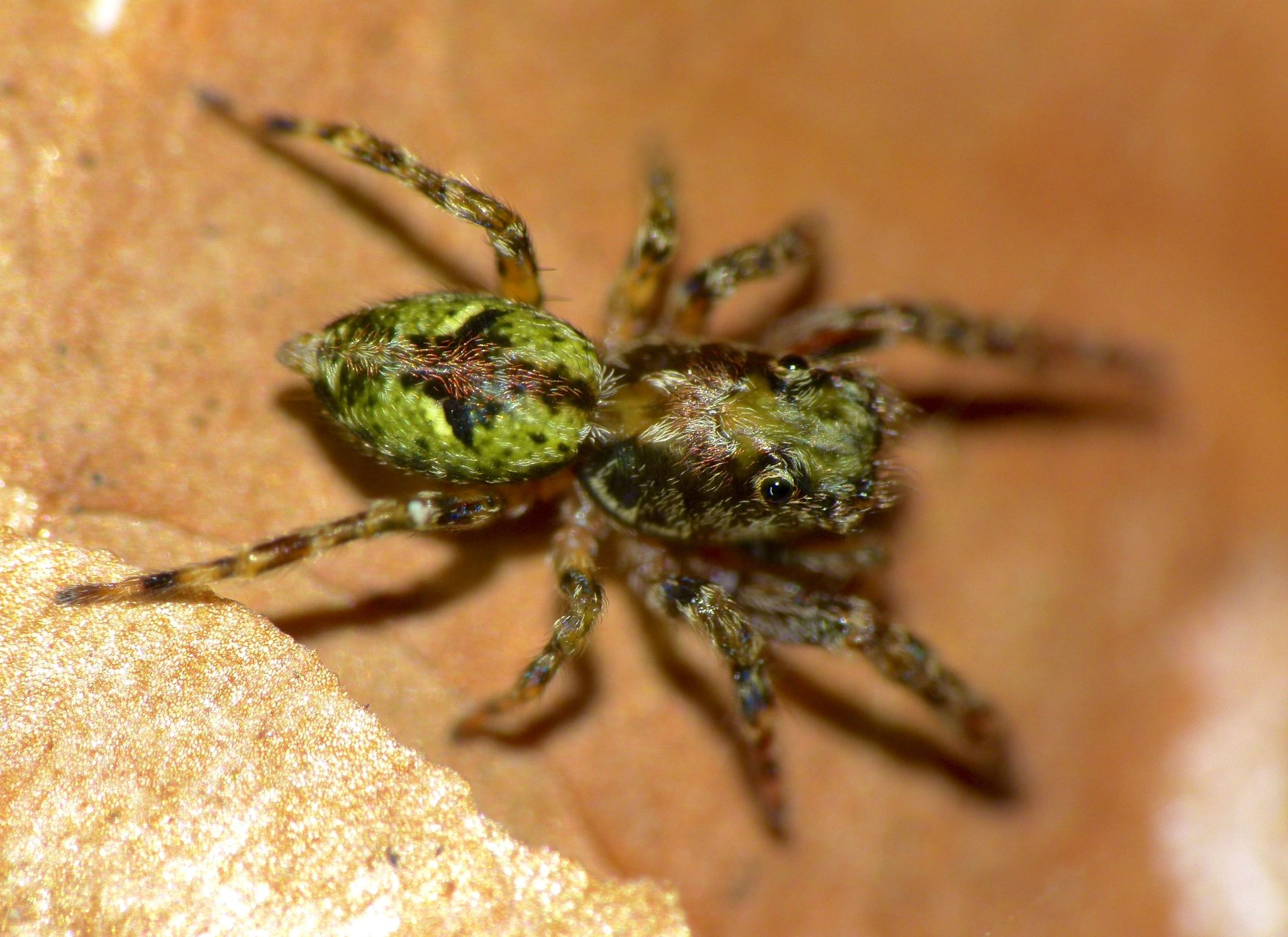

== Distribution and habitat ==
This species is known from throughout New Zealand. It is known from a wide range of habitats, but are typically associated with vegetation.

== Conservation status ==
Under the New Zealand Threat Classification System, this species is listed as not threatened.
