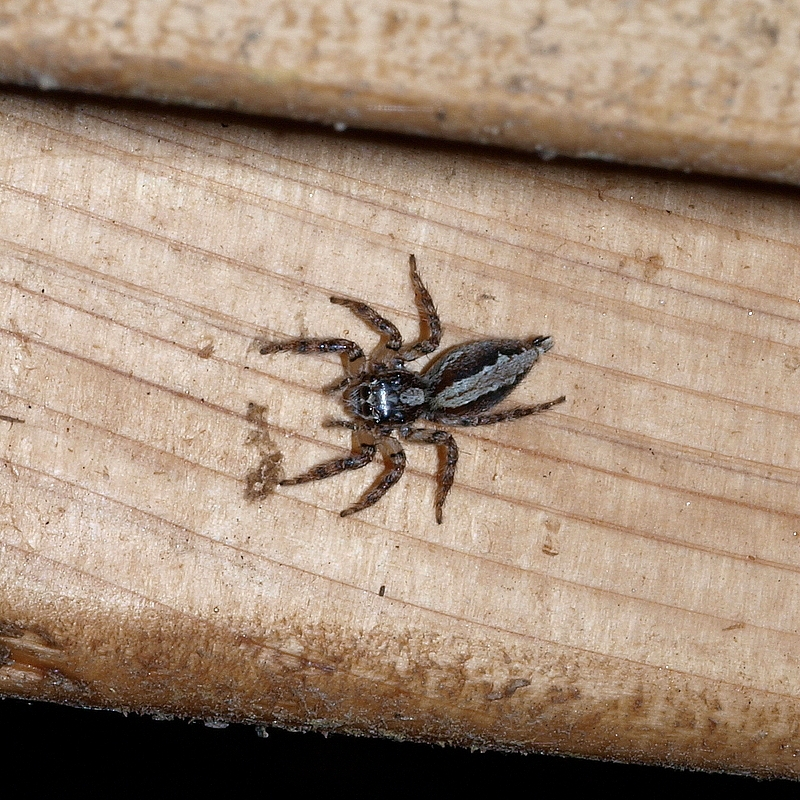
- A spider of the Pancorius genus

Scientific classification
- Kingdom: Animalia
- Phylum: Arthropoda
- Subphylum: Chelicerata
- Class: Arachnida
- Order: Araneae
- Infraorder: Araneomorphae
- Family: Salticidae
- Genus: Pancorius
- Species: P. wesolowskae

Binomial name
- Pancorius wesolowskae Wang & Wang, 2020

= Pancorius wesolowskae =

Species of spider

Pancorius wesolowskae is a species of jumping spider in the genus Pancorius that lives in China. The species was first described in 2020 by Wei-Hang Wang and Cheng Wang. The spider is large, measuring between 6.3 and 7.93 mm (0.248 and 0.312 in) in overall length. The carapace is dark brown and the opisthosoma dark grey with a pattern of light and dark. The female is larger than the male but otherwise very similar in colouration. The female spider is similar to Pancorius wangdicus but differs in have slit-shaped copulatory openings compared to the other species. The male has a blunter and shorter retrolateral tibial apophysis than the related Pancorius cadus.

== Taxonomy ==
Pancorius wesolowskae is a jumping spider that was first described by Wei-Hang Wang and Cheng Wang in 2020. The species is named after the Polish arachnologist Wanda Wesołowska. It was allocated to the genus Pancorius, which had been first described by Eugène Simon in 1894. The genus is one of 32 in the subtribe Plexippina in the tribe Plexippini. The subtribe is similar to Wayne Maddison's idea of Plexippinae. The spiders are predominantly found in Afro-Eurasia, and hard to differentiate. For example, the genera Evarcha, Hyllus and Pancorius are very similar in many morphological respects except size. Maddison listed the tribe in the clade Simonida. In 2016, it had been grouped with eight other genera of jumping spiders under the name Evarchines, named after the related genus Evarcha, by Jerzy Prószyński.

== Description ==
Pancorius wesolowskae is a large and stocky spider. The male has a total length of 6.3 mm (0.25 in). The cephalothorax] has a typical length of 3.36 mm (0.132 in) and width of 2.82 mm (0.111 in). The broad carapace is dark brown, with a red patch in the centre and with sparse white setae. The dark grey opisthosoma is 2.94 mm (0.116 in) long and 1.98 mm (0.078 in) wide and has a scattering of bristles. The top has a design formed of a light coloured central patch, a wave-like pattern and parallel lines. The bottom has a pattern of light and dark browns. The clypeus is brown with white setae. The chelicerae are dark brown with two fore and one back teeth. The spinnerets are dark brown to grey-yellow. The legs are brown-yellow to dark brown and spiney. The pedipalps are yellow-brown. The palpal bulb has a short, blunt, almost triangular retrolateral tibial apophysis and a thick embolus that starts large, expands larger and then tapers to a blunt tip.

The female is larger, measuring 7.93 mm (0.312 in) in length. The carapace is also typically larger, measuring 3.4 mm (0.13 in) in length and 2.85 mm (0.112 in) in width, as is the opisthosoma, which has a length of 4.53 mm (0.178 in) and a width of 3.44 mm (0.135 in). The patterning on both is similar, as are the colouring of the chelicerae, clypeus, legs and spinnerets. The epigyne has a two pockets located closely together towards the rear. Slit-shaped opening lead to the strongly sclerotized copulatory ducts. The fertilization ducts lead from the middle of round receptacles.

The species is similar to the related Pancorius cadus and Pancorius wangdicus The male can be differentiated from Pancorius wangdicus by the shorter retrolateral tibial apophysis while the female Pancorius wangdicus has C-shaped rather than slit copulatory openings.

== Distribution and habitat ==
Pancorius wesolowskae is endemic to China. The holotype was found in Fanjingshan National Nature Reserve in 2013. The spider seems to thrive amongst shrubs.
