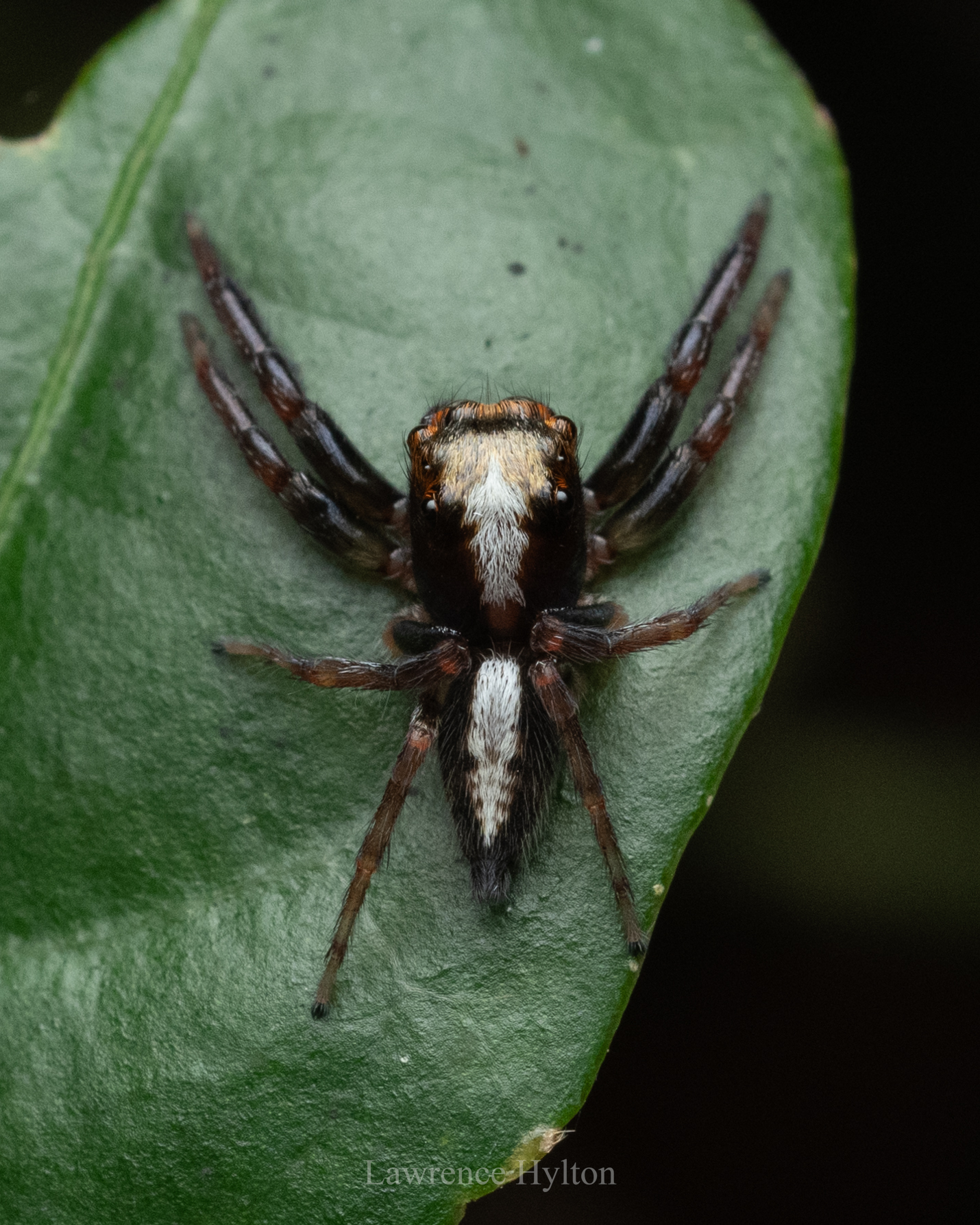
- male from Hong Kong

Scientific classification
- Kingdom: Animalia
- Phylum: Arthropoda
- Subphylum: Chelicerata
- Class: Arachnida
- Order: Araneae
- Infraorder: Araneomorphae
- Family: Salticidae
- Genus: Orientattus
- Species: O. hongkong

Binomial name
- Orientattus hongkong (Song, Xie, Zhu & Wu, 1997)

Synonyms
- Pancorius hongkong Song, Xie, Zhu & Wu, 1997

= Orientattus hongkong =

Species of spider

Orientattus hongkong is a species of jumping spider in the genus Orientattus. It is endemic to Hong Kong.

== Taxonomy ==
The species was originally described as Pancorius hongkong by Song, Xie, Zhu and Wu in 1997. In 2020, it was transferred to the newly established genus Orientattus by Caleb, who recognized that several Asian species previously placed in different genera shared distinctive morphological characteristics that warranted their own genus.

== Distribution ==
O. hongkong is described only from its type locality at Ho Pui (河背), New Territories, Hong Kong, where the female holotype was collected on 21 August 1995 using pitfall traps in grassland habitat.

== Description ==
The species is described only from the female holotype. The female has a total body length of 5.40 mm, with the cephalothorax measuring 2.45 mm in length and 1.71 mm in width, and the abdomen measuring 2.42 mm in length and 1.84 mm in width.

The cephalothorax has a darker brown eye region with black spots, covered with white short hairs and brown long hairs. The area behind the eye region is orange-yellow, with brown fine short hairs on the posterior and lateral parts. The dorsal surface shows brown spots forming several longitudinal stripes. The cephalothorax reaches its highest point at the posterior third, forming a gentle slope forward and a steeper slope backward.

The abdomen is greyish-yellow with irregular greyish-black markings and is covered with dense white short hairs and sparse brown long hairs. The ventral surface is greyish-yellow with a somewhat indistinct blackish-brown longitudinal band in the middle, with blackish-brown spots on the sides extending to create an appearance of three longitudinal bands when viewed dorsally.
