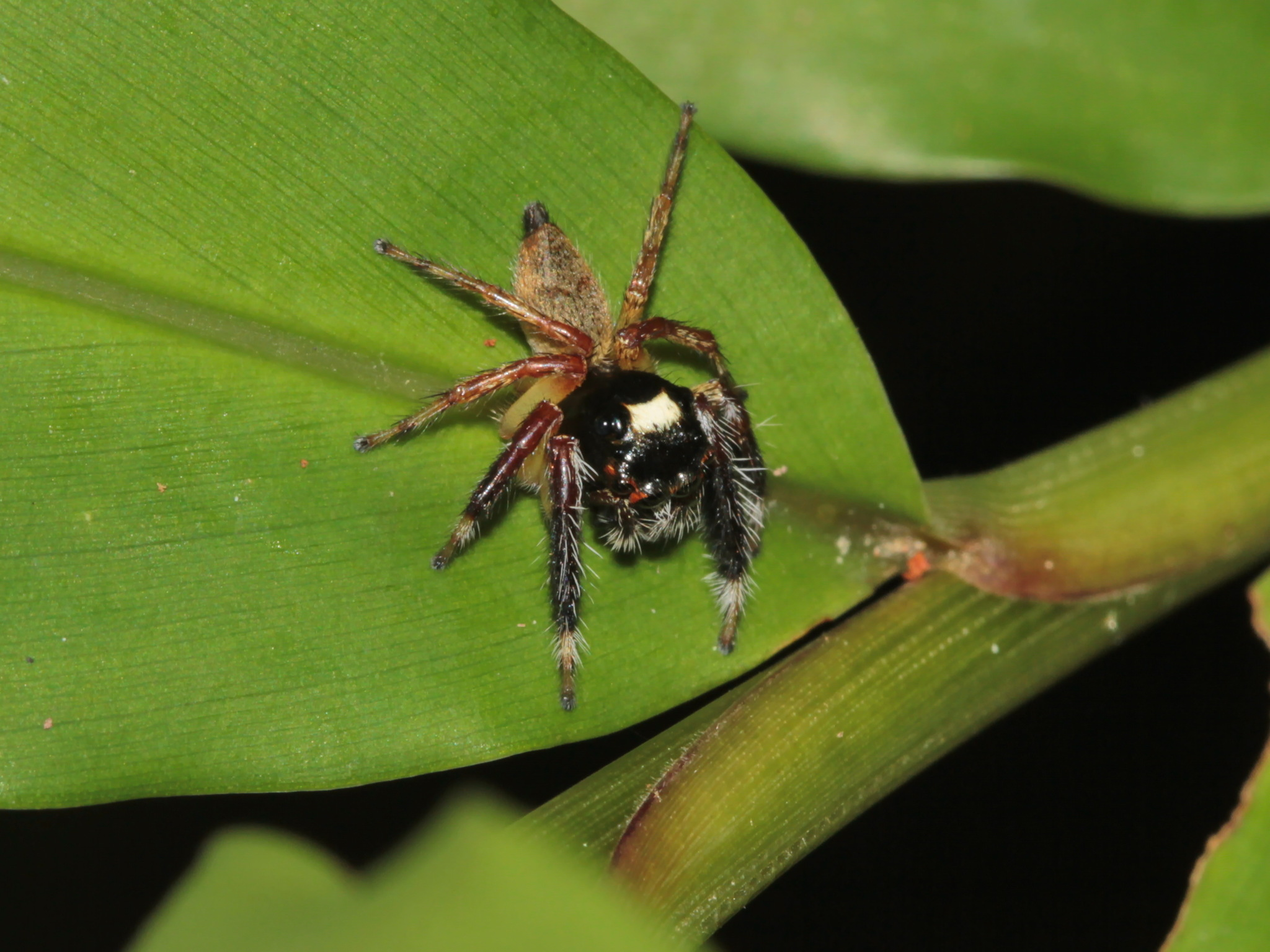
- from Thailand

Scientific classification
- Kingdom: Animalia
- Phylum: Arthropoda
- Subphylum: Chelicerata
- Class: Arachnida
- Order: Araneae
- Infraorder: Araneomorphae
- Family: Salticidae
- Genus: Pancorius
- Species: P. thorelli

Binomial name
- Pancorius thorelli (Simon, 1899)

Synonyms
- Hyllus thorelli Simon, 1899

= Pancorius thorelli =

Species of spider

Pancorius thorelli is a species of jumping spider in the genus Pancorius. It is found in Indonesia, specifically on the island of Sumatra.

The species is named after Tamerlan Thorell.

== Taxonomy ==
The species was originally described by Eugène Simon in 1899 as Hyllus thorelli based on a male specimen collected in Sumatra. In 1984, Jerzy Prószyński transferred the species to the genus Pancorius.

== Distribution ==
P. thorelli is endemic to Indonesia, where it has been recorded from Sumatra. Observations have also been made from Thailand, Malaysia and Borneo.

== Description ==
The original description by Simon describes a male specimen measuring 8-10 millimeters in length. The cephalothorax is brownish-chestnut to blackish in color with reddish-brown pubescence on both sides and extending to the eye region. There is a white hairy border that is quite broad. The abdomen is blackish with a very broad central white hairy stripe near the apex, marked with small black spots arranged in two rows above this stripe.

The species is noted as being unusual for the genus due to its third pair of legs being much longer than the fourth pair, a characteristic reminiscent of spiders in the genus Pseudamycus.
