= Nungia =

Scientific classification
- Kingdom: Animalia
- Phylum: Arthropoda
- Subphylum: Chelicerata
- Class: Arachnida
- Order: Araneae
- Infraorder: Araneomorphae
- Family: Salticidae
- Subfamily: Salticinae
- Genus: Nungia; Zabka, 1985

Diversity
- 6 species

Genus of spiders

Nungia is a genus of Asian jumping spiders containing 6 species, and was first described by Marek Michał Żabka in 1985.

As of November 2022, the World Spider Catalog accepted 6 species:

- Nungia epigynalis (Żabka, 1985) – China, Vietnam, Japan
- Nungia hatamensis (Thorell, 1881) – Malaysia, New Guinea
- Nungia modesta (Keyserling, 1883) – Australia (Queensland)
- Nungia papakula (Strand, 1911) – Indonesia (Aru Is.)
- Nungia tangi (Wang & Li, 2022) – China (Hainan)
- Nungia xiaolonghaensis (Cao & Li, 2016) – China
