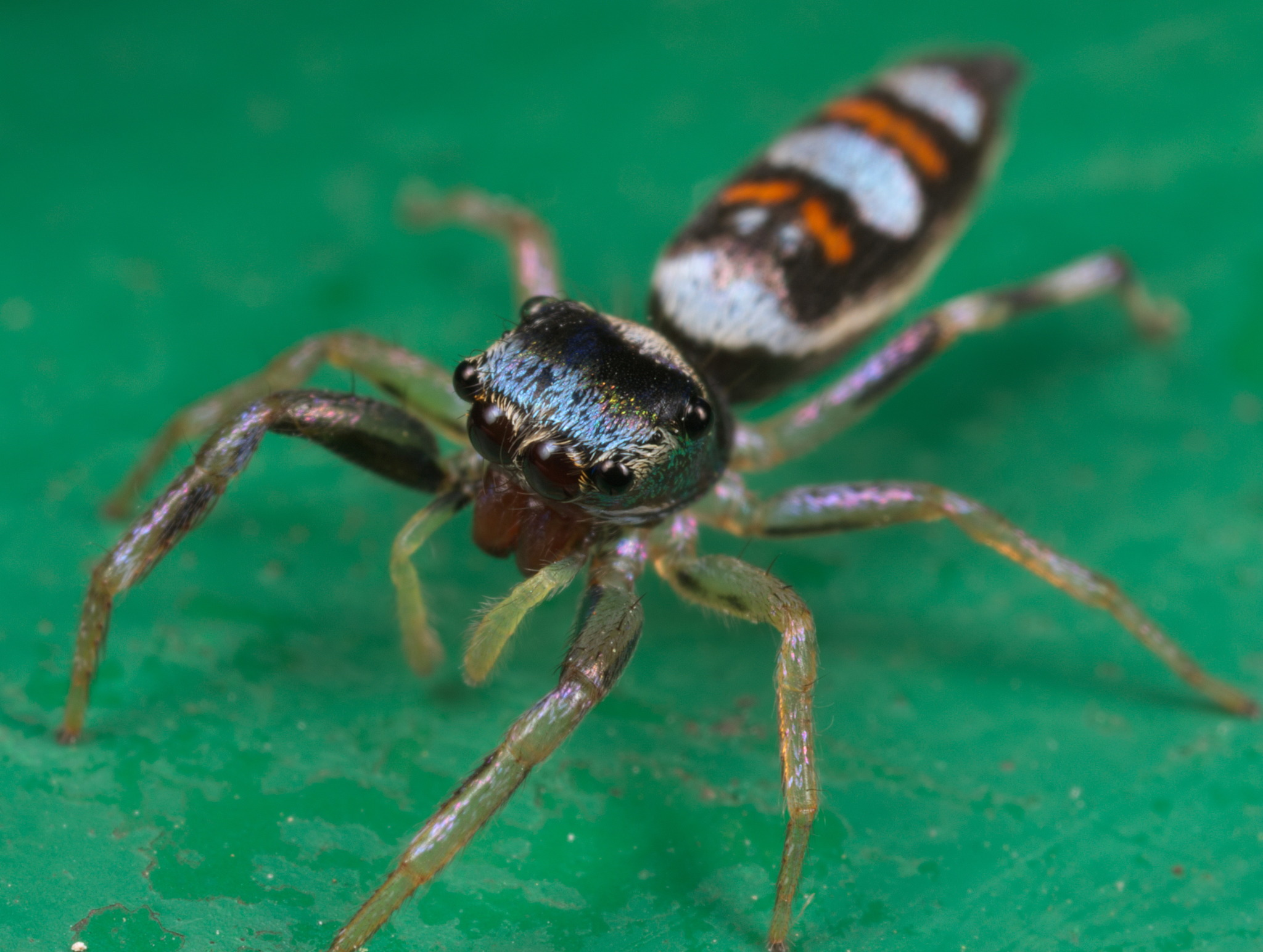
- Z. bulbus from Hong Kong

Scientific classification
- Kingdom: Animalia
- Phylum: Arthropoda
- Subphylum: Chelicerata
- Class: Arachnida
- Order: Araneae
- Infraorder: Araneomorphae
- Family: Salticidae
- Subfamily: Salticinae
- Genus: Zebraplatys; Zabka, 1992

Type species
- Z. fractivittata (Simon, 1909)

Species
- 5, see text

= Zebraplatys =

Genus of spiders

Zebraplatys is a genus of jumping spiders that was first described by Marek Michał Żabka in 1992.

== Species ==
As of September 2019 it contains five species, found in China, Hong Kong, Taiwan, New South Wales, Western Australia, and South Australia:

- Zebraplatys bulbus Peng, Tso & Li, 2002 – Taiwan
- Zebraplatys fractivittata (Simon, 1909) (type) – Australia (Western Australia)
- Zebraplatys harveyi Zabka, 1992 – Australia (South Australia to New South Wales)
- Zebraplatys keyserlingi Zabka, 1992 – Australia (Western Australia)
- Zebraplatys quinquecingulata (Simon, 1909) – Australia (Western Australia)
