= Philates =

Scientific classification
- Kingdom: Animalia
- Phylum: Arthropoda
- Subphylum: Chelicerata
- Class: Arachnida
- Order: Araneae
- Infraorder: Araneomorphae
- Family: Salticidae
- Subfamily: Salticinae
- Genus: Philates; Simon, 1900

Type species
- P. grammicus Simon, 1900

Species
- 10, see text

Genus of spiders

Philates is a genus of jumping spiders that was first described by Eugène Louis Simon in 1900.

== Species ==
As of August 2019 it contains ten species, found only in the Philippines, Indonesia, and Papua New Guinea:

- Philates chelifer (Simon, 1900) – Indonesia (Java, Borneo)
- Philates courti (Zabka, 1999) – New Guinea
- Philates grammicus Simon, 1900 (type) – Philippines, Indonesia
- Philates platnicki (Zabka, 1999) – New Guinea
- Philates proszynskii (Zabka, 1999) – New Guinea
- Philates rafalskii (Zabka, 1999) – New Guinea
- Philates szutsi Benjamin, 2004 – Borneo
- Philates thaleri Benjamin, 2004 – Borneo
- Philates variratae (Zabka, 1999) – New Guinea
- Philates zschokkei Benjamin, 2004 – Indonesia
