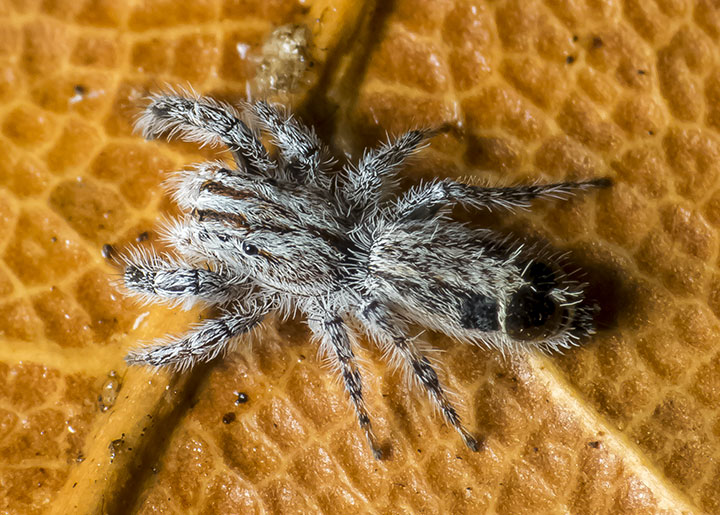
- Abracadabrella elegans (Elegant Fly Mimic) which is found on the eastern Australian coast from Cape York to around Sydney

Scientific classification
- Kingdom: Animalia
- Phylum: Arthropoda
- Subphylum: Chelicerata
- Class: Arachnida
- Order: Araneae
- Infraorder: Araneomorphae
- Family: Salticidae
- Subfamily: Salticinae
- Genus: Abracadabrella; Zabka, 1991

Type species
- Marptusa elegans L. Koch, 1879

Species
- See text

Diversity
- 3 species

= Abracadabrella =

Genus of spiders

Abracadabrella is a genus of spiders in the family Salticidae (jumping spiders) whose species appear to mimic flies.

This genus does not appear to be related to other described Salticidae genera. It has some similarities to the Afraflacilla - Pseudicius group but has no stridulatory organs.

The type species for the genus was first described by Ludwig Koch (1879) as Marptusa elegans, transferred to Ocrisiona by Eugène Simon (1901) then placed into the newly described genus, Abracadabrella by Marek Żabka (1991).

Specimens have been collected on or under Eucalyptus bark, or on vegetation. They are small to medium, flattish jumping spiders with large, bulging, black-shiny 'eyes' on the rear of the abdomen, apparently to mimic flies. It is in the unident group, with one retromarginal tooth on the chelicera, two on the promargin opposite. Leg I is the strongest, while leg IV the longest. These spiders have been observed walking backwards, enhancing the mimicry affect. They are found mostly in Queensland, especially warmer parts, on vegetation and under the bark of gum trees. Specimens have been sighted at Darwin NT, Townsville QLD, Wooloolga, Gosford and Grafton NSW. A western Queensland species from Birdsville and a South Australian species from Lewiston have been documented.

== Name ==
The genus name appears to be a play on the word Abracadabra but is cited by the author as being a random combination of letters, feminine in gender.

== Species ==
- Abracadabrella birdsville Żabka, 1991 – Queensland
- Abracadabrella elegans (L. Koch, 1879) – Queensland
- Abracadabrella lewiston Żabka, 1991 – South Australia
