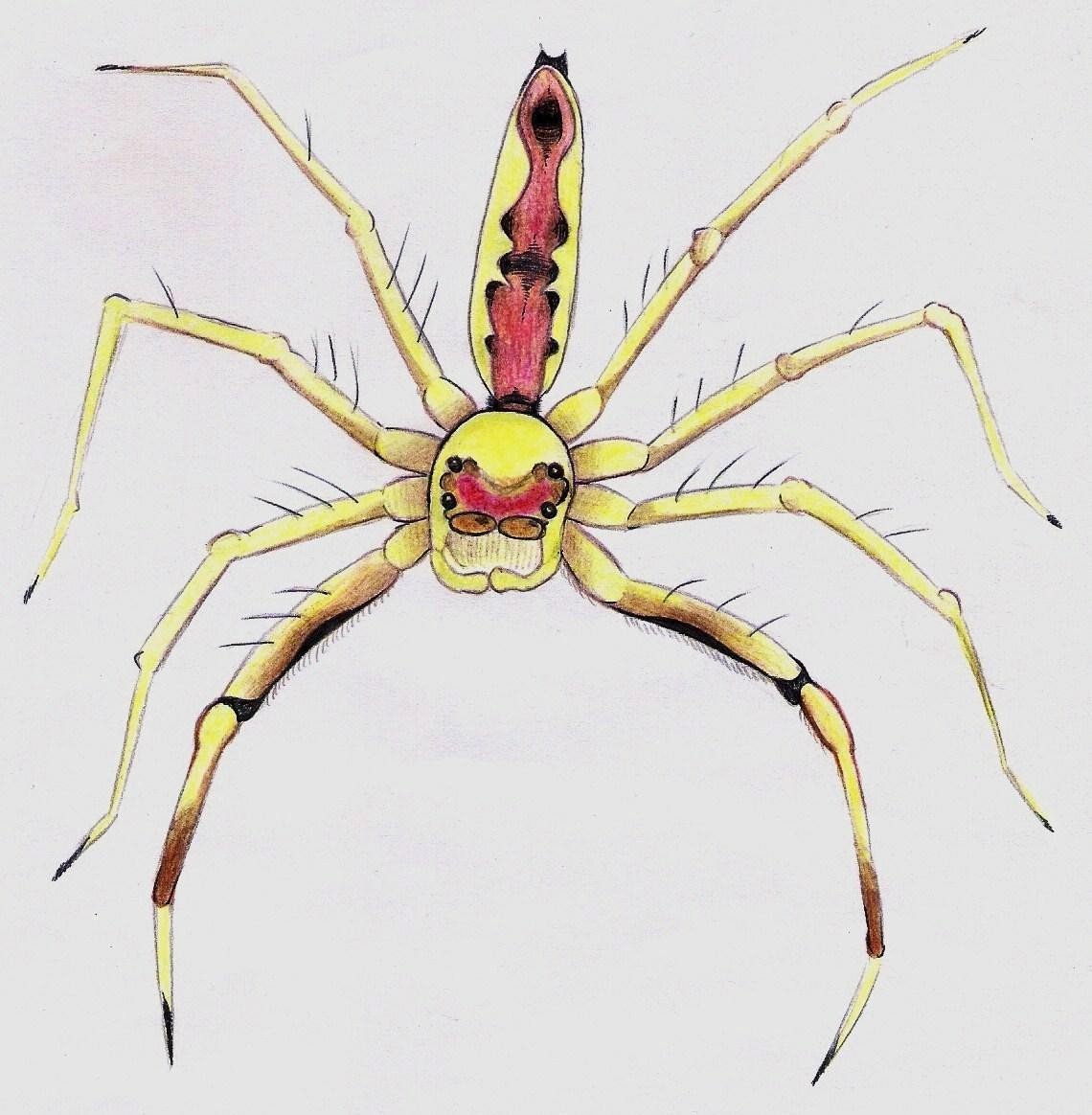
- Astilodes mariae

Scientific classification
- Kingdom: Animalia
- Phylum: Arthropoda
- Subphylum: Chelicerata
- Class: Arachnida
- Order: Araneae
- Infraorder: Araneomorphae
- Family: Salticidae
- Genus: Astilodes; Zabka, 2009
- Species: A. mariae

Binomial name
- Astilodes mariae Zabka, 2009

= Astilodes =

Genus of spiders

Astilodes is a monotypic genus of jumping spiders containing the single species, Astilodes mariae. It was first described by Marek Michał Żabka in 2009, and is only found in Queensland.
