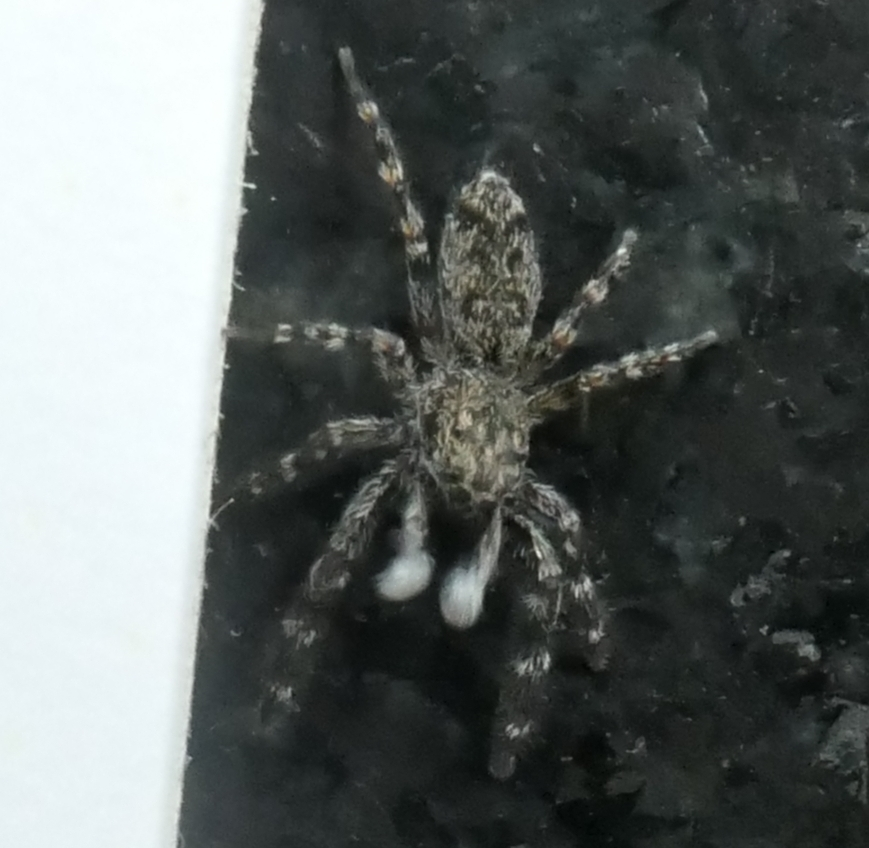

Conservation status
- Not Threatened (NZ TCS)

Scientific classification
- Kingdom: Animalia
- Phylum: Arthropoda
- Subphylum: Chelicerata
- Class: Arachnida
- Order: Araneae
- Infraorder: Araneomorphae
- Family: Salticidae
- Genus: Adoxotoma
- Species: A. forsteri

Binomial name
- Adoxotoma forsteri Żabka, 2004

= Adoxotoma forsteri =

Species of spider

Adoxotoma forsteri is a species of Salticidae that is endemic to New Zealand.

== Taxonomy ==
This species was described in 2004 by Marek Michał Żabka from male and female specimens. The species name refers to Ray Forster. The holotype is stored in Otago Museum.

== Description ==
This species is roughly 3.5mm in length. This species is black and brown with white hairs.

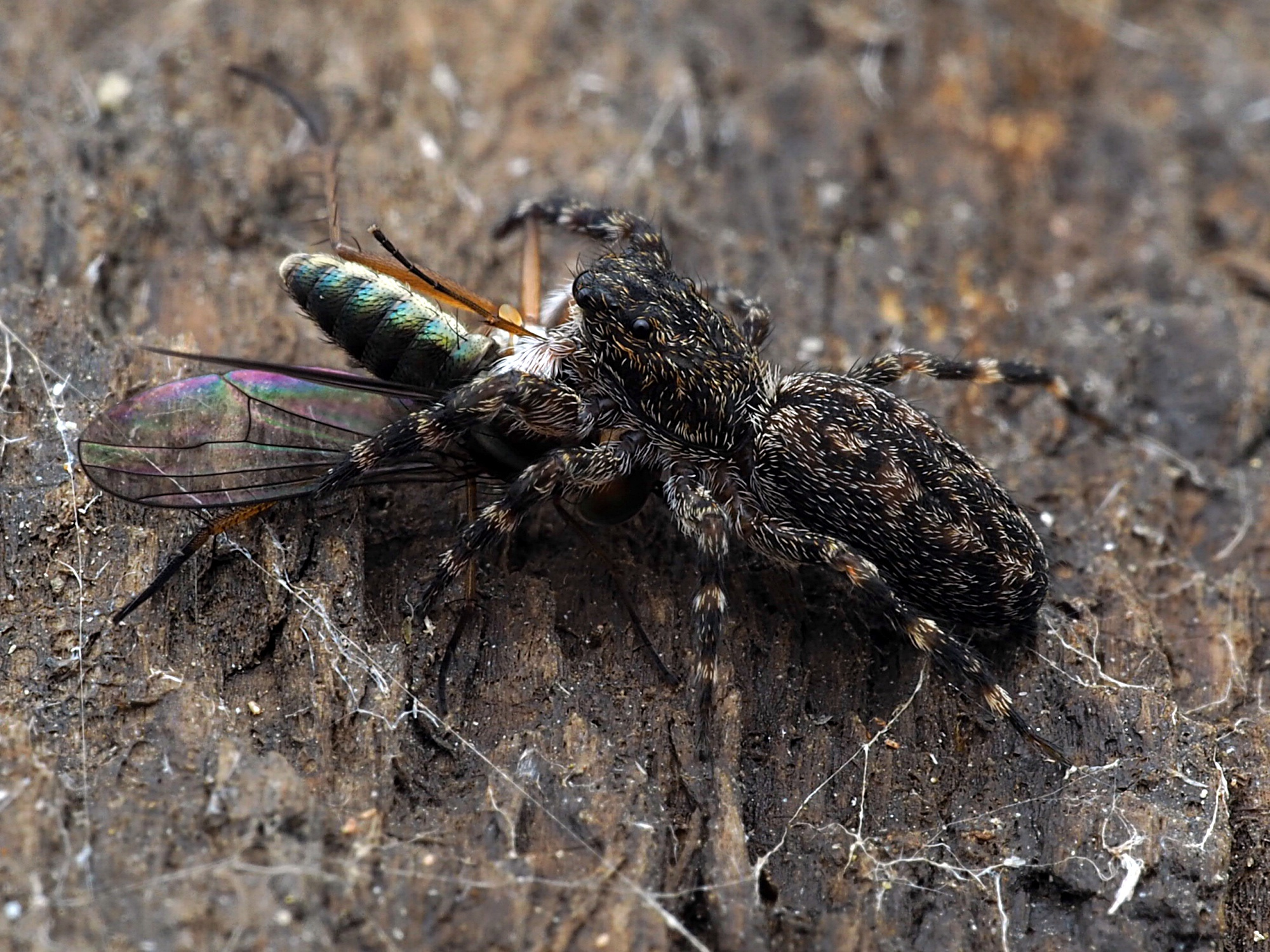
Adoxotoma forsteri eating a fly.

== Distribution ==
This species is known from scattered localities throughout New Zealand.

== Conservation status ==
Under the New Zealand Threat Classification System, this species is listed as "Not Threatened".
