= Sławomir Żukowski =

Polish actor (1958–2026)

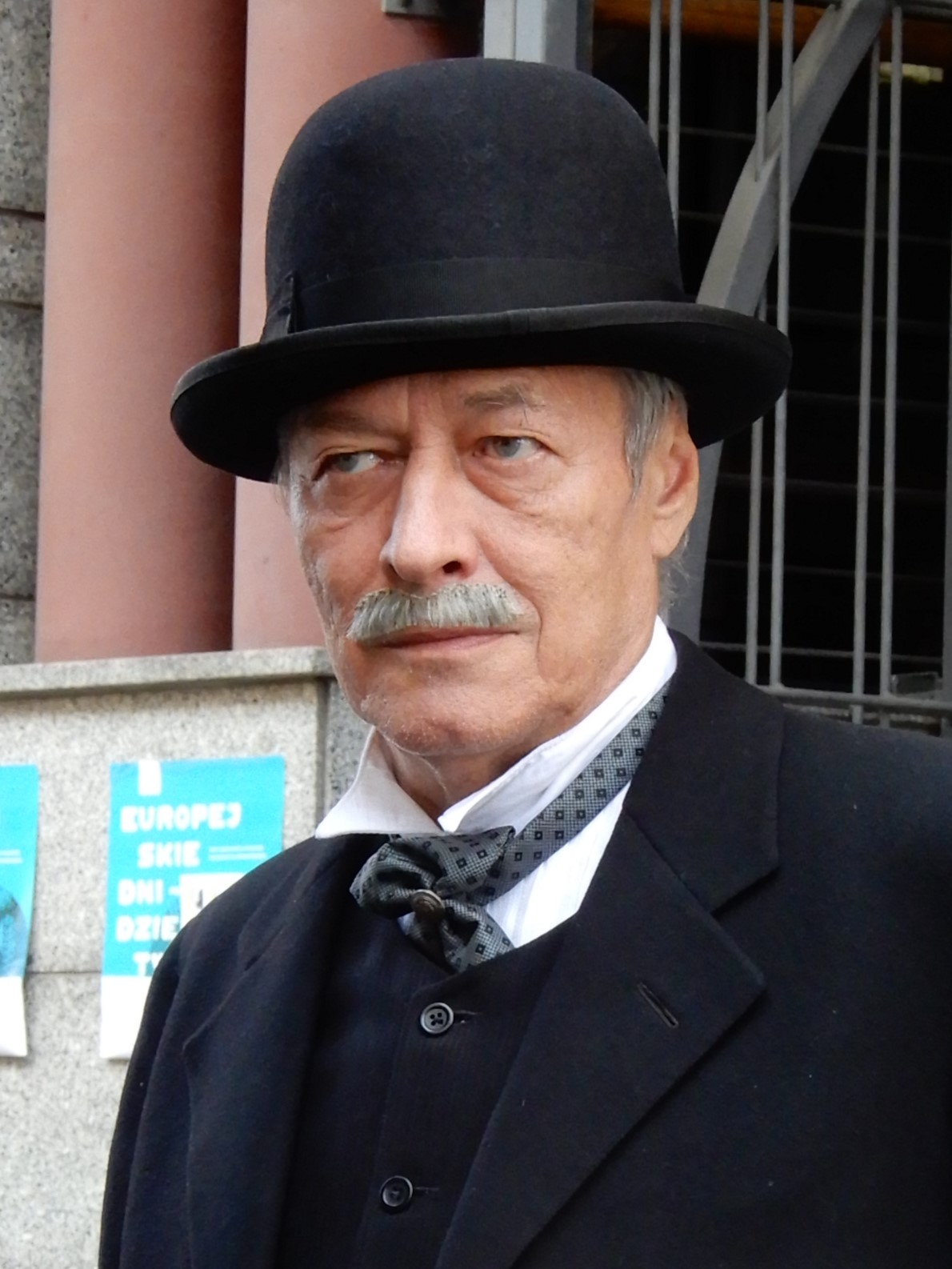
- Żukowski as Wojciech Korfanty during European Heritage Days 2020
- Born: 20 November 1958; Radom, Poland
- Died: 25 June 2026 (aged 67); Tychy, Poland
- Education: Siedlce University
- Occupation: Actor
- Years active: 1978–2026

Sławomir Żukowski (20 November 1958 – 25 June 2026) was a Polish theatre director, actor, screenwriter and scenographer. He was founder of BELFEgoR Theatre in Tychy.

== Life and career ==
A graduate of the State Secondary School of fine arts in Wrocław, Żukowski completed his internship at the Wrocław Polish Theatre in the painting studio, co-creating the set design for Henryk Tomaszewski's pantomime. After completing his studies, Żukowski began working as an art teacher at Primary School No. 22 in Tychy.

On 17 February 1986, Żukowski founded the amateur teachers' theatre "Belfer" at the ZNP Club in Tychy, which has been called the BELFEgoR Theatre since 1990.

During the 2nd Tychy Music Festival named after Rysiek Riedel (29–30 July 2000), Żukowski set a new Guinness World Record for painting a 10 m^{2} picture in the shortest time. The record breaking took place live, during a concert by the band Dżem.

Zukowski died in Tychy on 25 June 2026, at the age of 67.
