= Sondra (spider) =

Scientific classification
- Kingdom: Animalia
- Phylum: Arthropoda
- Subphylum: Chelicerata
- Class: Arachnida
- Order: Araneae
- Infraorder: Araneomorphae
- Family: Salticidae
- Subfamily: Salticinae
- Genus: Sondra; Wanless, 1988

Type species
- S. nepenthicola Wanless, 1988

Species
- 15, see text

Genus of spiders

Sondra is a genus of Australian jumping spiders that was first described by F. R. Wanless in 1988.

== Species ==
As of August 2019 it contains fifteen species, found in Western Australia, South Australia, Queensland, and New South Wales:

- Sondra aurea (L. Koch, 1880) – Australia (New South Wales)
- Sondra bickeli Zabka, 2002 – Australia (New South Wales)
- Sondra bifurcata Wanless, 1988 – Australia (Queensland)
- Sondra brindlei Zabka, 2002 – Australia (New South Wales)
- Sondra bulburin Wanless, 1988 – Australia (Queensland)
- Sondra convoluta Wanless, 1988 – Australia (Queensland)
- Sondra damocles Wanless, 1988 – Australia (Queensland)
- Sondra excepta Wanless, 1988 – Australia (Queensland)
- Sondra finlayensis Wanless, 1988 – Australia (Queensland)
- Sondra littoralis Wanless, 1988 – Australia (Queensland)
- Sondra nepenthicola Wanless, 1988 (type) – Australia (Queensland, New South Wales)
- Sondra raveni Wanless, 1988 – Australia (Queensland)
- Sondra samambrayi Zabka, 2002 – Australia (South Australia)
- Sondra tristicula (Simon, 1909) – Australia (Western Australia)
- Sondra variabilis Wanless, 1988 – Australia (Queensland)
