= Urogelides =

Scientific classification
- Kingdom: Animalia
- Phylum: Arthropoda
- Subphylum: Chelicerata
- Class: Arachnida
- Order: Araneae
- Infraorder: Araneomorphae
- Family: Salticidae
- Genus: Urogelides; Zabka, 2009
- Species: U. daviesae

Binomial name
- Urogelides daviesae Zabka, 2009

Genus of spiders

Urogelides is a genus of jumping spiders containing one described species, Urogelides daviesae, and other undescribed species. It was first described by Marek Michał Żabka in 2009, and is found in Queensland, Australia.

== Description ==
Urogelides are 2-3 mm long. The head has the shape of an elongate rectangle with slightly rounded sides and is slightly wider behind the posterior lateral eyes (when viewed from above). The carapace is low with a gently curved upper surface, being highest behind the posterior lateral eyes. Each chelicera has one large retromarginal tooth and two promarginal teeth. The abdomen is elongate-ovate, has light and dark stripes, and ends in long spinnerets and a long anal tubercle. The first pair of legs is slightly longer and stouter than the other pairs.

The pedipalp of the male has a short, thick embolus arising with a clockwise curve on the distal edge of the tegulum. The tegulum is blocky and has a proximal bulge. The palpal tibia has a bilobed apophysis, with the outer branch thumb-like and smoothly rounded while the inner branch is talon-like.

The epigyne of the female has two slit-like copulatory openings. These are connected to the insemination ducts, which lead medo-posteriorly to pear-shaped spermathecae near the epigyne's posterior edge. Leading off the sides of the spermathecae are large lateral chambers. Anterior to the copulatory openings is a hard-to-see median pouch.

== Ecology ==
These spiders occur in litter and on vegetation in dry open forests. They wave their spinnerets up and down while walking. Combined with their morphology, this suggests Urogelides may be mimics of springtails. The mimicry may be for luring prey (aggressive mimicry).

Females with egg sacs have been found in retreats between fallen leaves, the leaves being wedged in outer forks of Allocasuarina plants.
