= Abracadabrella lewiston =

Scientific classification
- Kingdom: Animalia
- Phylum: Arthropoda
- Subphylum: Chelicerata
- Class: Arachnida
- Order: Araneae
- Infraorder: Araneomorphae
- Family: Salticidae
- Genus: Abracadabrella
- Species: A. lewiston

Binomial name
- Abracadabrella lewiston Żabka, 1991
- Holotype site: female (SAMAN1988336) Two Wells, South Australia

Species of jumping spider

Abracadabrella lewiston is a species of jumping spider in the genus Abracadabrella. The species was first described in 1991 by Marek Żabka, and is known only from its type locality (Two Wells, Lewiston Park, SA), where it was found in the bark of fallen Eucalyptus trees.
