= Abracadabrella birdsville =

Scientific classification
- Kingdom: Animalia
- Phylum: Arthropoda
- Subphylum: Chelicerata
- Class: Arachnida
- Order: Araneae
- Infraorder: Araneomorphae
- Family: Salticidae
- Genus: Abracadabrella
- Species: A. birdsville

Binomial name
- Abracadabrella birdsville Żabka, 1991

Species of spider

Abracadabrella birdsville is a species of jumping spider in the genus Abracadabrella. The species was first described in 1991 by Marek Michał Żabka. These spiders are usually easily found in Queensland.
