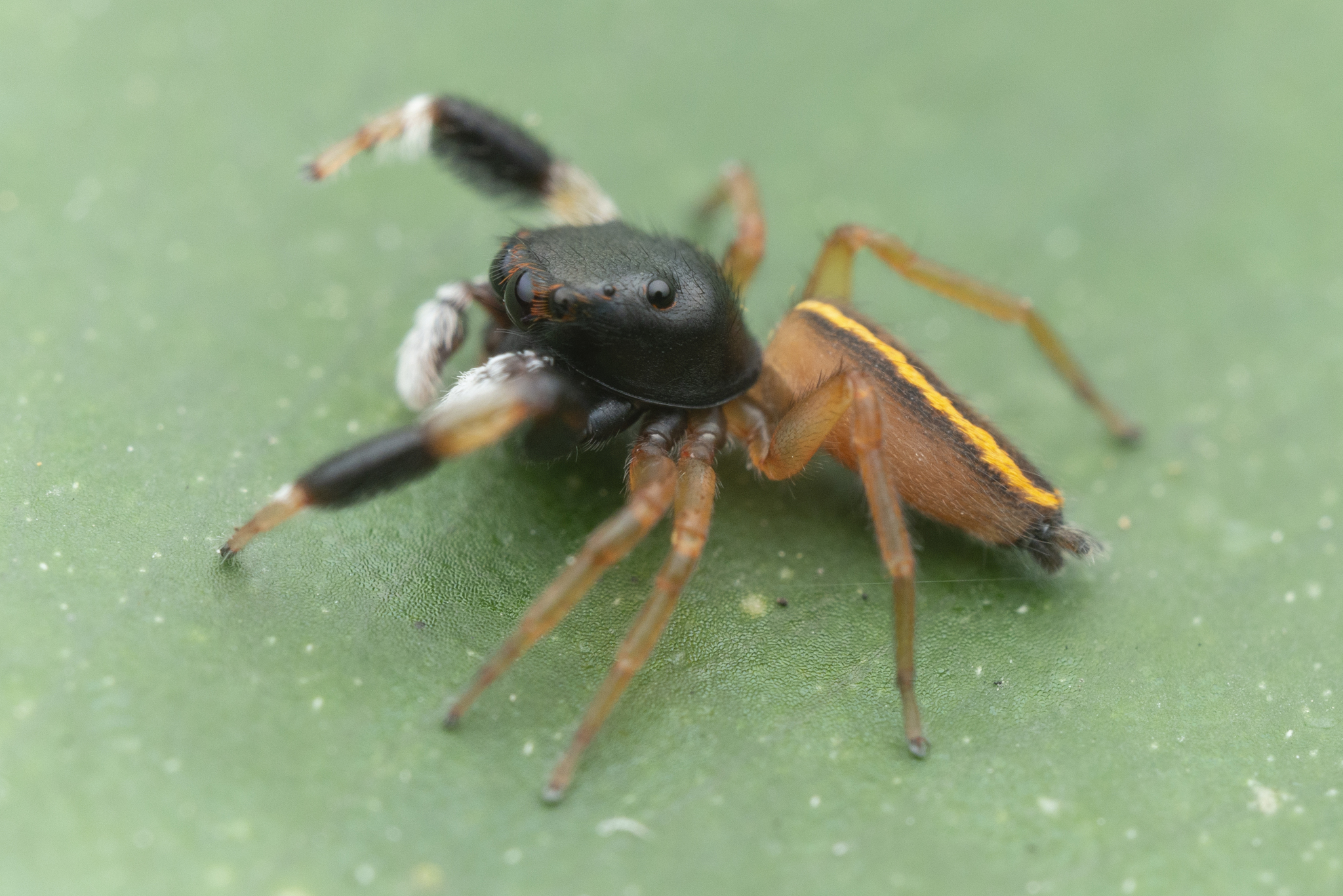
- from Hong Kong

Scientific classification
- Kingdom: Animalia
- Phylum: Arthropoda
- Subphylum: Chelicerata
- Class: Arachnida
- Order: Araneae
- Infraorder: Araneomorphae
- Family: Salticidae
- Genus: Nungia
- Species: N. epigynalis

Binomial name
- Nungia epigynalis Zabka, 1985

= Nungia epigynalis =

Species of spider

Nungia epigynalis was first described by Marek Michał Żabka in 1985 from a single 6 millimetres (0.24 in) long female, although males have subsequently been found. The name is derived from the Nùng people of Vietnam and China. The species name is derived from "epigyne".

Females have a light brown thorax, with a greyish-yellow opisthosoma and longitudinal rows of grey spots. Its legs are yellow, except for the stronger first pair, which are light brown except for the distal segments. They are only found in Asia.
