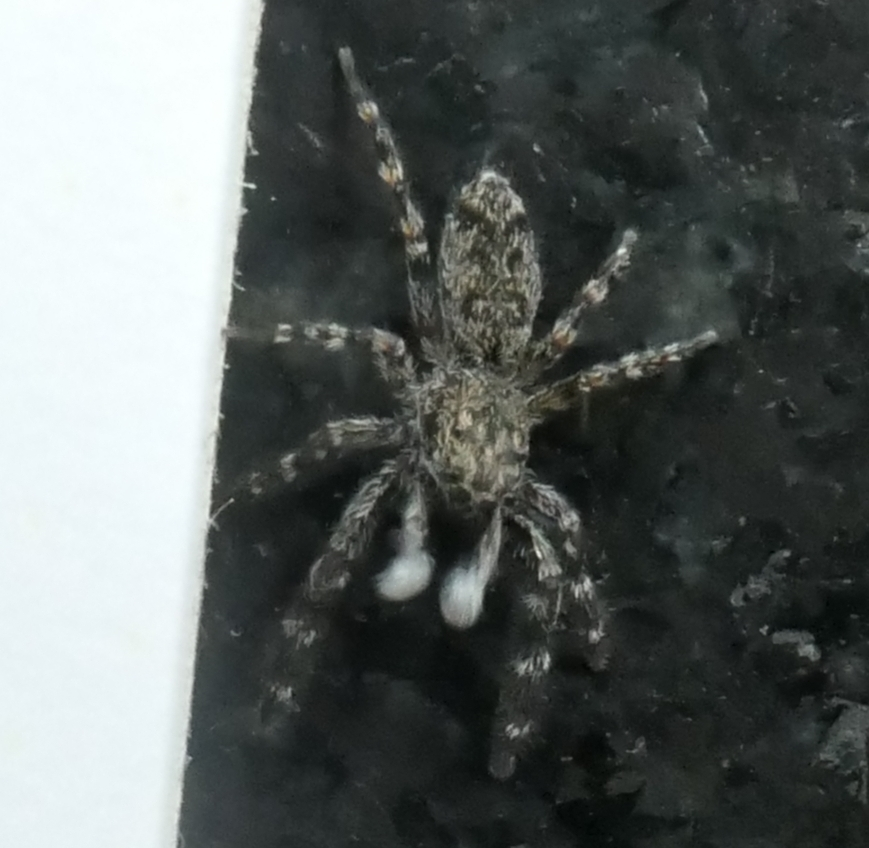
- Adoxotoma forsteri

Scientific classification
- Kingdom: Animalia
- Phylum: Arthropoda
- Subphylum: Chelicerata
- Class: Arachnida
- Order: Araneae
- Infraorder: Araneomorphae
- Family: Salticidae
- Subfamily: Salticinae
- Genus: Adoxotoma; Simon, 1909

Type species
- A. nigroolivacea Simon, 1909

Species
- 10, see text

= Adoxotoma =

Genus of spiders

Adoxotoma is a genus of South Pacific jumping spiders that was first described by Eugène Louis Simon in 1909.

== Species ==
As of June 2019 it contains ten species, found only in New Zealand and Australia:

- Adoxotoma bargo Zabka, 2001 – Australia (New South Wales)
- Adoxotoma chionopogon Simon, 1909 – Australia (Western Australia)
- Adoxotoma embolica Gardzińska & Zabka, 2010 – Australia (Western Australia)
- Adoxotoma forsteri Zabka, 2004 – New Zealand
- Adoxotoma hannae Zabka, 2001 – Australia (New South Wales)
- Adoxotoma justyniae Zabka, 2001 – Australia (New South Wales)
- Adoxotoma nigroolivacea Simon, 1909 (type) – Australia (Western Australia)
- Adoxotoma nitida Gardzińska & Zabka, 2010 – Australia (Western Australia)
- Adoxotoma nodosa (L. Koch, 1879) – Australia (Queensland)
- Adoxotoma sexmaculata Gardzińska & Zabka, 2010 – Australia (Western Australia)
