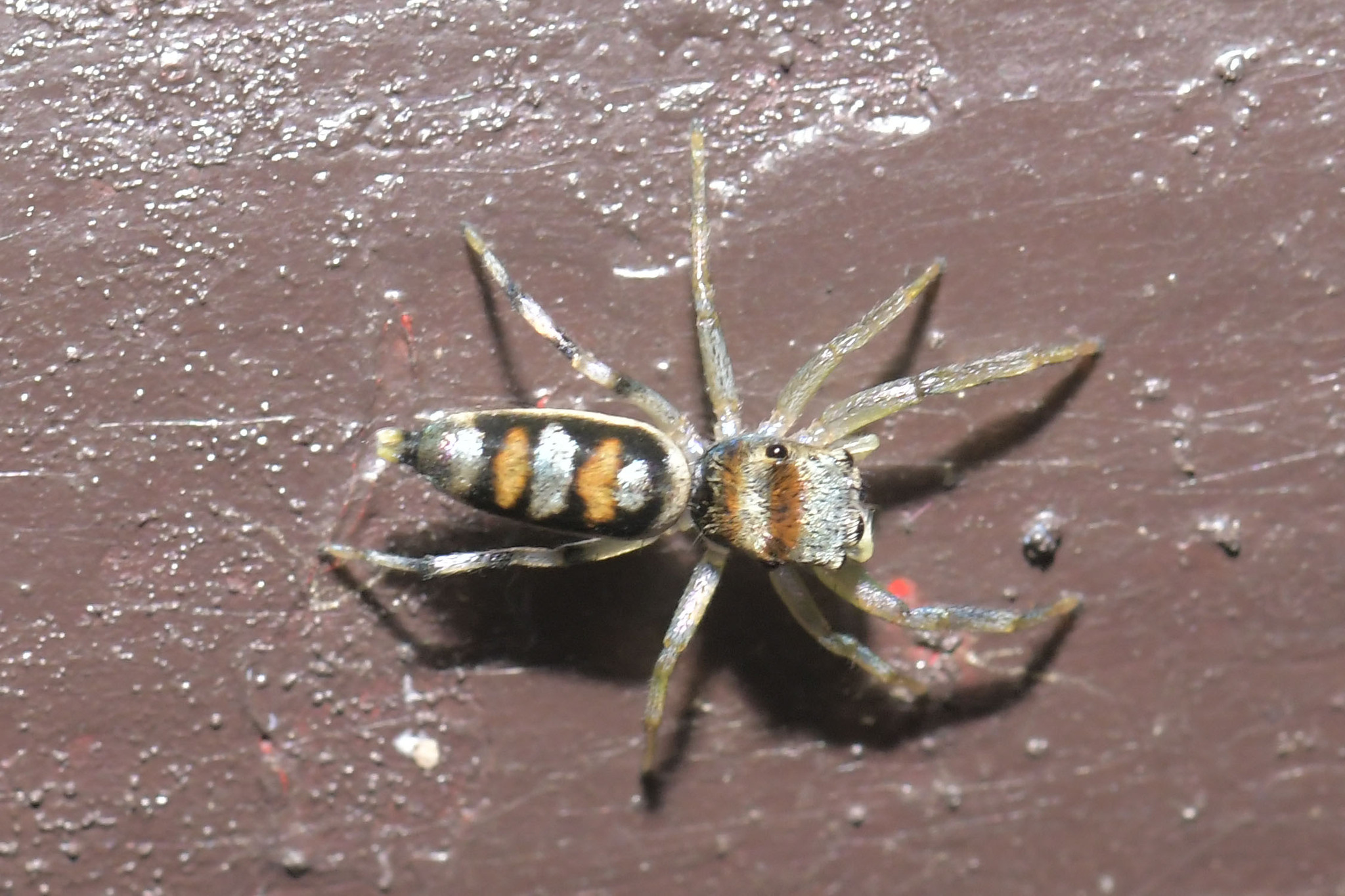
- from Taiwan

Scientific classification
- Kingdom: Animalia
- Phylum: Arthropoda
- Subphylum: Chelicerata
- Class: Arachnida
- Order: Araneae
- Infraorder: Araneomorphae
- Family: Salticidae
- Genus: Zebraplatys
- Species: Z. bulbus

Binomial name
- Zebraplatys bulbus Peng, Tso & Li, 2002

= Zebraplatys bulbus =

Species of spider

Zebraplatys bulbus is a species of jumping spider.

== Appearance ==
The species has a very flat body, the carapace is dark to blackish brown.

== Name ==
The specific name is derived from the spherical spermatheca of the vulva.

== Distribution ==
Zebraplatys bulbus is known from China, Hong Kong and Taiwan. All other described Zebraplatys species are from Australia.

== Literature ==
- Peng, Xian-Jin; Tso, I-Min & Li, Shu-Qiang (2002): Five new and four newly recorded species of jumping spiders from Taiwan (Araneae: Salticidae). Zoological Studies 41(1): 1-12. PDF
- Platnick, Norman I. (2007): The world spider catalog, version 8.0. American Museum of Natural History.
