= Orientattus bicuspidatus =

Scientific classification
- Kingdom: Animalia
- Phylum: Arthropoda
- Subphylum: Chelicerata
- Class: Arachnida
- Order: Araneae
- Infraorder: Araneomorphae
- Family: Salticidae
- Genus: Orientattus
- Species: O. bicuspidatus

Binomial name
- Orientattus bicuspidatus (Peng & Li, 2003)
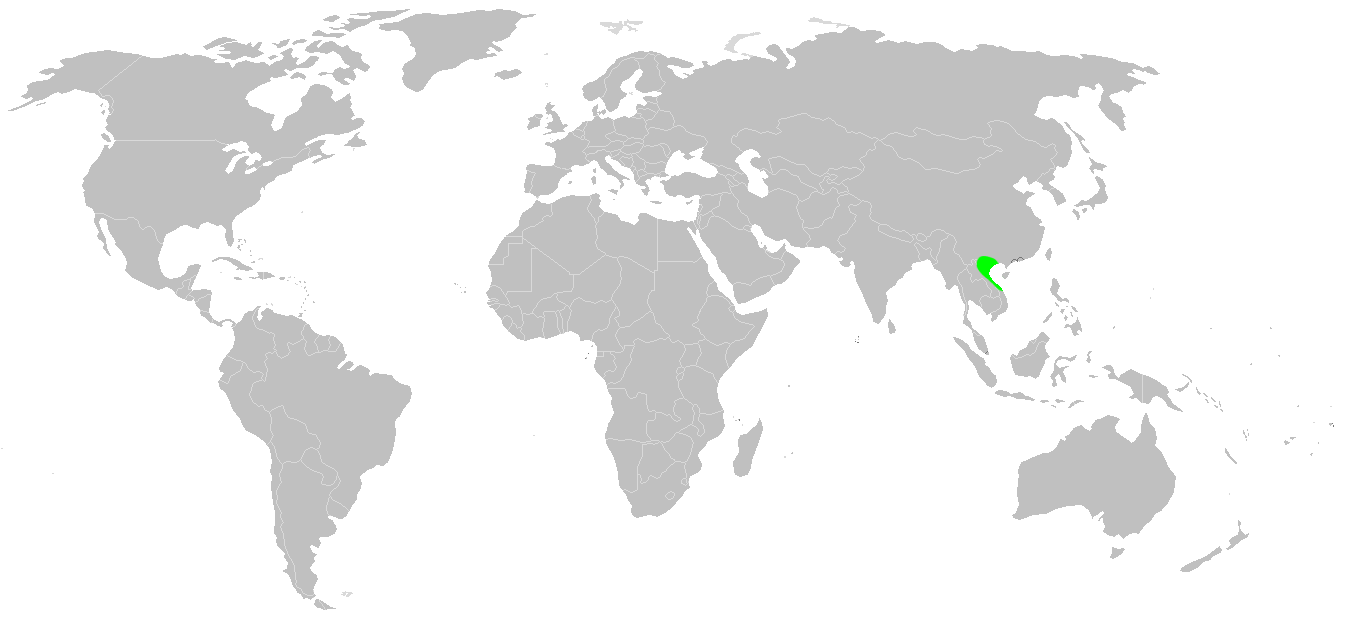

Synonyms
- Evarcha bicuspidata Peng & Li, 2003; Evawes bicuspidata (Peng & Li, 2003)

Species of spider

Orientattus bicuspidatus, synonym Evarcha bicuspidata, is a jumping spider found only in Vietnam. It was originally placed in the genus Evarcha, but was transferred to Orientattus in 2020.

The spider is 3.6 mm long. Males are dark brown, with a darker area around the eyes. They are covered with dark brown and white hairs. Two pairs of yellowish brown transverse bands are seen on the thoracic area. The legs are dark brown with yellowish brown rings.

== Name ==
The species name is derived from Latin, bi "two" and cuspidata "sharp ended", referring to the two-pronged retrolateral tibial apophysis, now considered a feature of the genus Orientattus.
