= Schenkelia ibadanensis =

Scientific classification
- Kingdom: Animalia
- Phylum: Arthropoda
- Subphylum: Chelicerata
- Class: Arachnida
- Order: Araneae
- Infraorder: Araneomorphae
- Family: Salticidae
- Genus: Schenkelia
- Species: S. ibadanensis

Binomial name
- Schenkelia ibadanensis Wesołowska & Russell-Smith, 2011

Species of spider

Schenkelia ibadanensis is a jumping spider species that lives in Nigeria. The species is named after the Nigerian city Ibadan.
