= Abracadabrella elegans =

Scientific classification
- Kingdom: Animalia
- Phylum: Arthropoda
- Subphylum: Chelicerata
- Class: Arachnida
- Order: Araneae
- Infraorder: Araneomorphae
- Family: Salticidae
- Genus: Abracadabrella
- Species: A. elegans

Binomial name
- Abracadabrella elegans L Koch, 1879

Species of spider

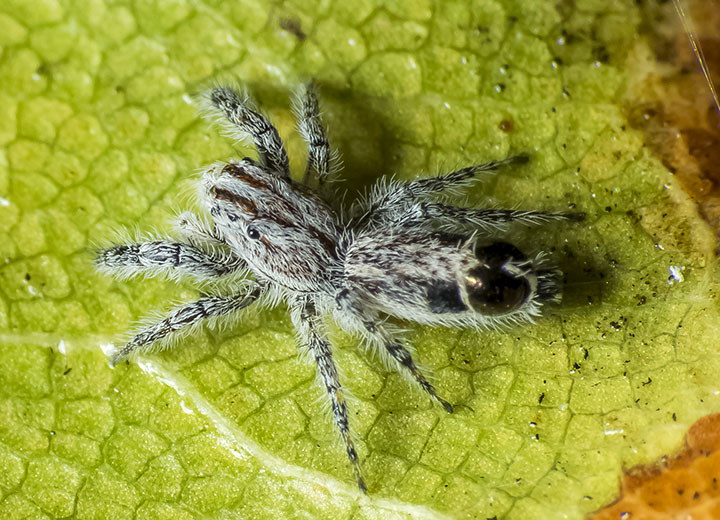
Abracadabrella elegans, Townsville 2012, body length 3.8mm.

Abracadabrella elegans is a species of jumping spider in the genus Abracadabrella. Its common name is Elegant Fly Mimic. It is common in coastal Eastern Australia, mostly Queensland. It appears to mimic a large fly with two black raised, rounded mounds on the rear of the abdomen, which look like eyes, and its spinnerets which resemble a fly's mouthparts. It walks backwards apparently to enhance the mimicry. Abracadabrella spp. are found on or under bark or on foliage from coastal north Queensland south to at least the central coast NSW.

It was first named Marptusa elegans by L. Koch in 1879 when he described the female, then changed to Ocrisiona elegans by Simon in 1901. The genus name Abracadabrella was created by Zabka in 1991 when he also described the male.

Abracadabrella gallery

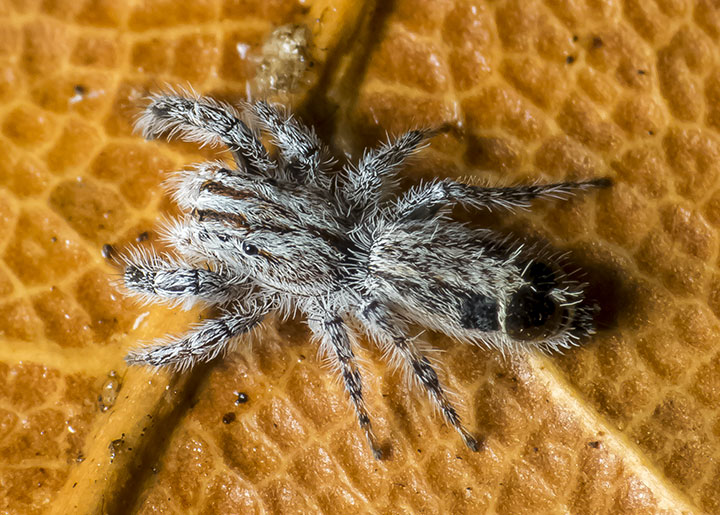
Abracadabrella elegans (Elegant Fly Mimic) from Townsville QLD an Australian Jumping Spider. Male, body length 3.8mm

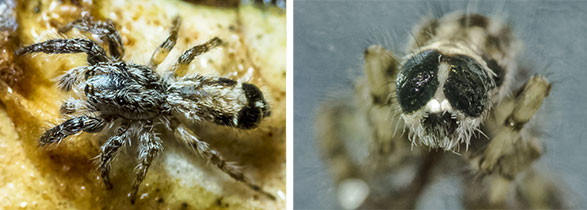
Abracadabrella elegans (Elegant Fly Mimic) from Grafton NSW an Australian Jumping Spider. Male, body length 3.8 mm Composite picture showing spider from above and a view of the eyes from rear

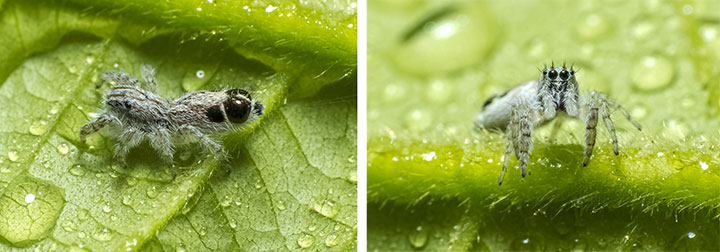
Abracadabrella elegans (Elegant Fly Mimic) from Townsville QLD an Australian Jumping Spider. Female, body length 4 mm Composite image showing spider side on and facing

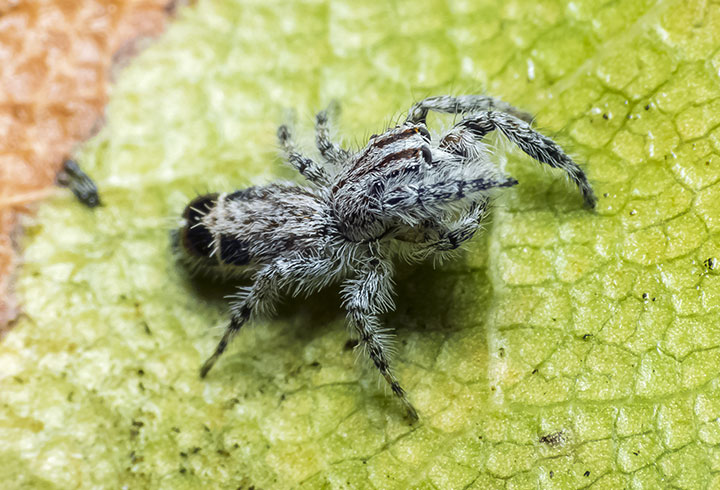
Abracadabrella elegans (Elegant Fly Mimic) from Townsville QLD an Australian Jumping Spider. Male, body length 3.8 mm
