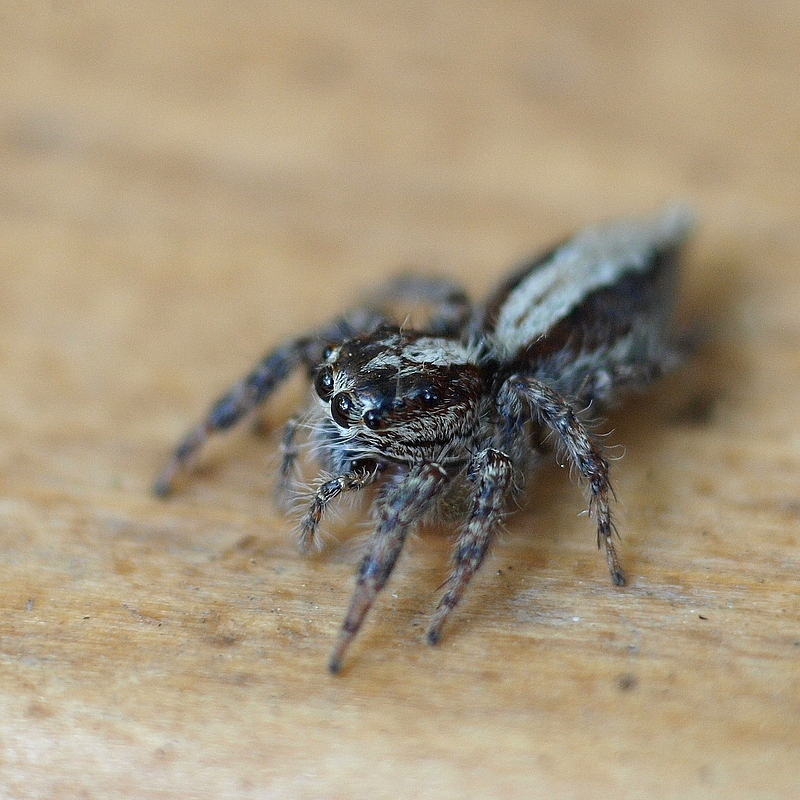
- Pancorius crassipes

Scientific classification
- Kingdom: Animalia
- Phylum: Arthropoda
- Subphylum: Chelicerata
- Class: Arachnida
- Order: Araneae
- Infraorder: Araneomorphae
- Family: Salticidae
- Subfamily: Salticinae
- Genus: Pancorius; Simon, 1902

Type species
- P. dentichelis (Simon, 1899)

Species
- 41, see text

Synonyms
- Orissania Prószyński, 1992

= Pancorius =

Genus of spiders

Pancorius is a genus of Asian jumping spiders that was first described by Eugène Louis Simon in 1902. They are similar to Hyllus.

== Description ==
Pancorius, or at least its Vietnamese species, are rather big, thickset and densely haired jumping spiders. The male palpal organ has a simple structure, while the female epigyne has two pockets and their internal structures consist of 2-3 vast chambers.

== Habitat ==
Pancorius have been collected from various habitats including a roadside wall with dense vegetation, open forest, tropical rainforest and jungle.

== Diet ==
One species, P. changricus, has been reported to feed on various flies (hover flies, black flies, cluster flies), booklice and thrips.

== Species ==
As of August 2023 it contains the following species, found throughout southern Asia, with one palaearctic species (P. crassipes):

- Pancorius alboclypeus Kanesharatnam & Benjamin, 2021 – Sri Lanka
- Pancorius altus Kanesharatnam & Benjamin, 2021 – Sri Lanka
- Pancorius animosus Peckham & Peckham, 1907 – Borneo
- Pancorius armatus Jastrzebski, 2011 – Nepal
- Pancorius athukoralai Kanesharatnam & Benjamin, 2021 – Sri Lanka
- Pancorius borneensis Simon, 1902 – Borneo
- Pancorius cadus Jastrzebski, 2011 – Nepal
- Pancorius candidus Wang & Wang, 2020 – China
- Pancorius changricus Zabka, 1990 – Bhutan
- Pancorius cheni Peng & Li, 2008 – China
- Pancorius crassipes (Karsch, 1881) – Eastern and South-eastern Asia, Poland (?)
- Pancorius crinitus Logunov & Jäger, 2015 – Vietnam
- Pancorius curtus (Simon, 1877) – Philippines
- Pancorius dabanis (Hogg, 1922) – India
- Pancorius daitaricus (Prószyński, 1992) – India
- Pancorius darjeelingianus Prószyński, 1992 – India
- Pancorius dentichelis (Simon, 1899) (type) – Indonesia (Sumatra)
- Pancorius fasciatus Peckham & Peckham, 1907 – Borneo
- Pancorius goulufengensis Peng, Yin, Yan & Kim, 1998 – China
- Pancorius guiyang Yang, Gu & Yu, 2023 – China
- Pancorius hainanensis Song & Chai, 1991 – China
- Pancorius kaskiae Zabka, 1990 – Nepal
- Pancorius kohi Zhang, Song & Li, 2003 – Singapore
- Pancorius latus Cao & Li, 2016 – China
- Pancorius lui Gan, Mi & Wang, 2022 – China
- Pancorius magniformis Zabka, 1990 – Bhutan
- Pancorius magnus Zabka, 1985 – India, Nepal, Vietnam, Taiwan
- Pancorius naevius Simon, 1902 – Indonesia (Java, Sumatra)
- Pancorius nagaland Caleb, 2019 – India
- Pancorius nahang Logunov, 2021 – Vietnam
- Pancorius petoti Prószyński & Deeleman-Reinhold, 2013 – Borneo
- Pancorius protervus (Simon, 1902) – Malaysia
- Pancorius pseudomagnus Logunov, 2021 – Vietnam
- Pancorius relucens (Simon, 1901) – China (Hong Kong)
- Pancorius scoparius Simon, 1902 – Indonesia (Java)
- Pancorius submontanus Prószyński, 1992 – India, Japan
- Pancorius tagorei Prószyński, 1992 – India
- Pancorius taiwanensis Bao & Peng, 2002 – Taiwan
- Pancorius thorelli (Simon, 1899) – Indonesia (Sumatra)
- Pancorius urnus Jastrzebski, 2011 – Nepal
- Pancorius wangdicus Zabka, 1990 – Bhutan
- Pancorius wesolowskae Wang & Wang, 2020 – China
