= Pancorius guiyang =

Guiyang jumping spider

Scientific classification
- Kingdom: Animalia
- Phylum: Arthropoda
- Subphylum: Chelicerata
- Class: Arachnida
- Order: Araneae
- Infraorder: Araneomorphae
- Family: Salticidae
- Genus: Pancorius
- Species: P. guiyang

Binomial name
- Pancorius guiyang Yang, Gu & Yu, 2023

Species of jumping spider

Pancorius guiyang, the Guiyang jumping spider, is a species of jumping spider native to China. The species was first described in 2023, after being discovered inside a bamboo forest in Guiyang.

== Description ==
Pancorius guiyang females measure 9.72 mm in total length, while males are smaller, measuring around 7.87 mm. The carapace of females measure 4.27 mm long and 3.08 mm wide, while those of males measure 4.02 mm long and 2.88 mm wide.

Generally, the carapace is black while legs are yellow. The abdomen of male P. guiyang have red patches and are covered in white hairs; in contrast, the abdomen of female P. guiyang have yellowish-white patterns and are sparsely covered in red hairs.
