= Pancorius taiwanensis =

Scientific classification
- Kingdom: Animalia
- Phylum: Arthropoda
- Subphylum: Chelicerata
- Class: Arachnida
- Order: Araneae
- Infraorder: Araneomorphae
- Family: Salticidae
- Genus: Pancorius
- Species: P. taiwanensis

Binomial name
- Pancorius taiwanensis Bao & Peng, 2002

Species of spider

Pancorius taiwanensis is a species of jumping spiders found only in Taiwan. It is a tiny spider with a total length (excluding legs) of only 2.25 millimetres (0.089 in). The densely hairy carapace is dark brown with a large pale, roughly triangular patch centrally. The legs are dark brown with large, prominent spines. The oval abdomen is grey with darker and lighter striations with paler patches on each side at the front.

This species can only be distinguished from the similar Pancorius magnus by study of the genitalia.
