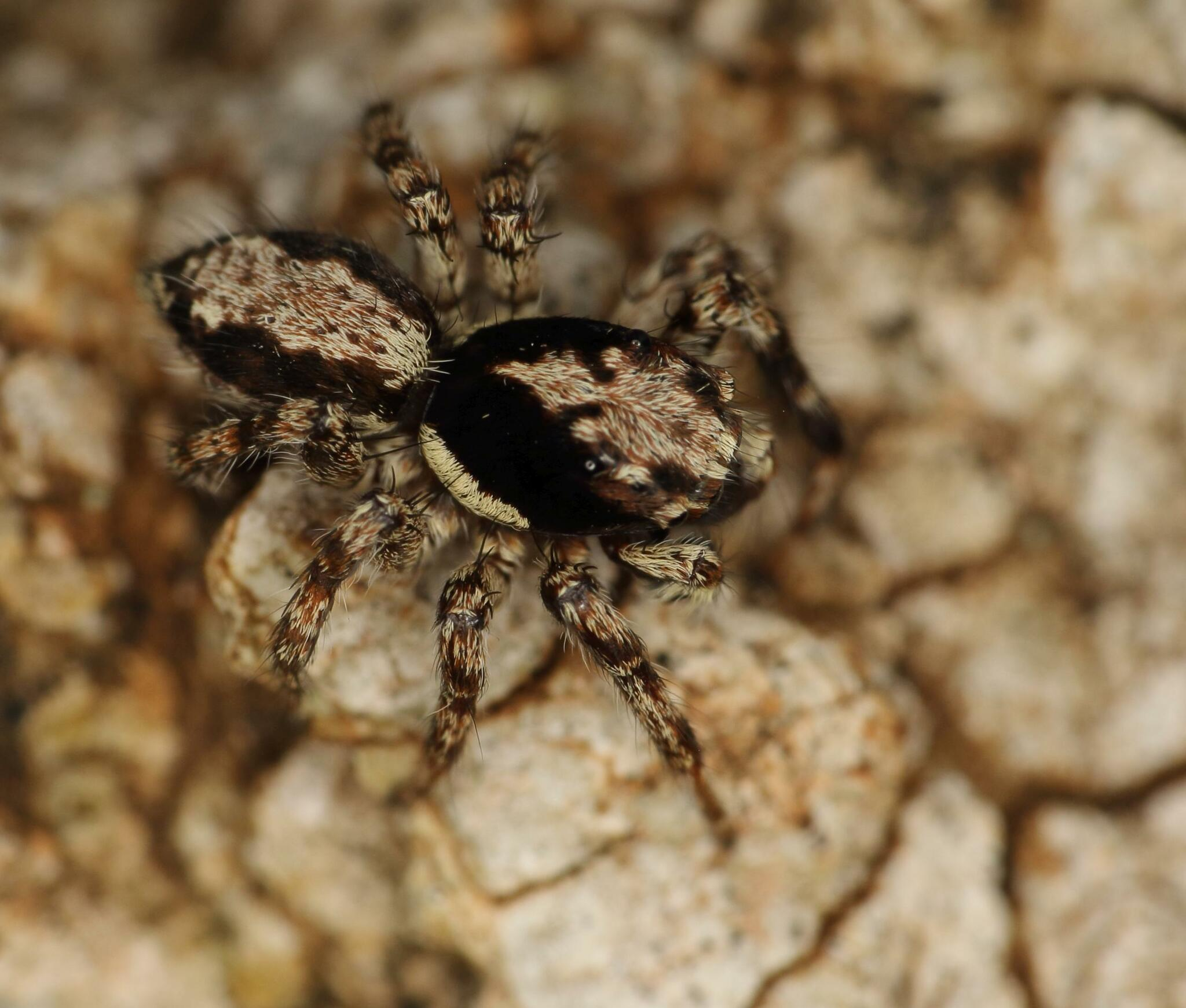
- S. modesta
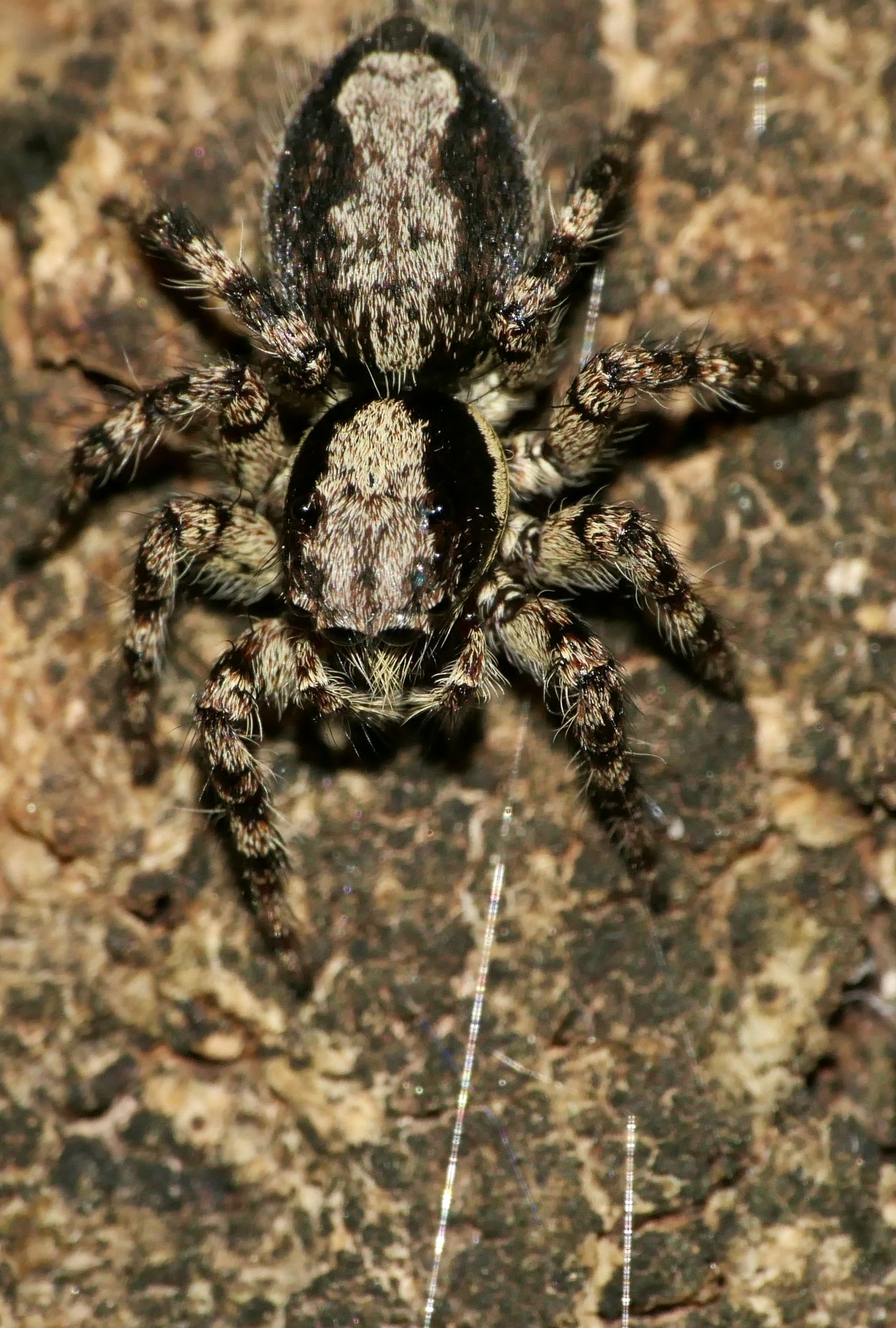
- S. modesta

Scientific classification
- Kingdom: Animalia
- Phylum: Arthropoda
- Subphylum: Chelicerata
- Class: Arachnida
- Order: Araneae
- Infraorder: Araneomorphae
- Family: Salticidae
- Subfamily: Salticinae
- Genus: Schenkelia; Lessert, 1927

Type species
- S. modesta Lessert, 1927

Species
- 5, see text

= Schenkelia =

Genus of spiders

Schenkelia is a genus of African jumping spiders, first described by Roger de Lessert in 1927.

The genus is named after Swiss arachnologist Ehrenfried Schenkel-Haas.

== Species ==
As of October 2025, this genus includes four species:

- Schenkelia benoiti Wanless & Clark, 1975 – Guinea, Ivory Coast
- Schenkelia ibadanensis Wesołowska & Russell-Smith, 2011 – Nigeria
- Schenkelia lesserti Berland & Millot, 1941 – Guinea
- Schenkelia modesta Lessert, 1927 – Guinea, Ivory Coast, Nigeria, Cameroon, DR Congo, Uganda, Kenya, Tanzania, Zimbabwe, South Africa (type species)
