= Siedlce University =

Public university in Siedlce, Poland

- Uniwersytet w Siedlcach
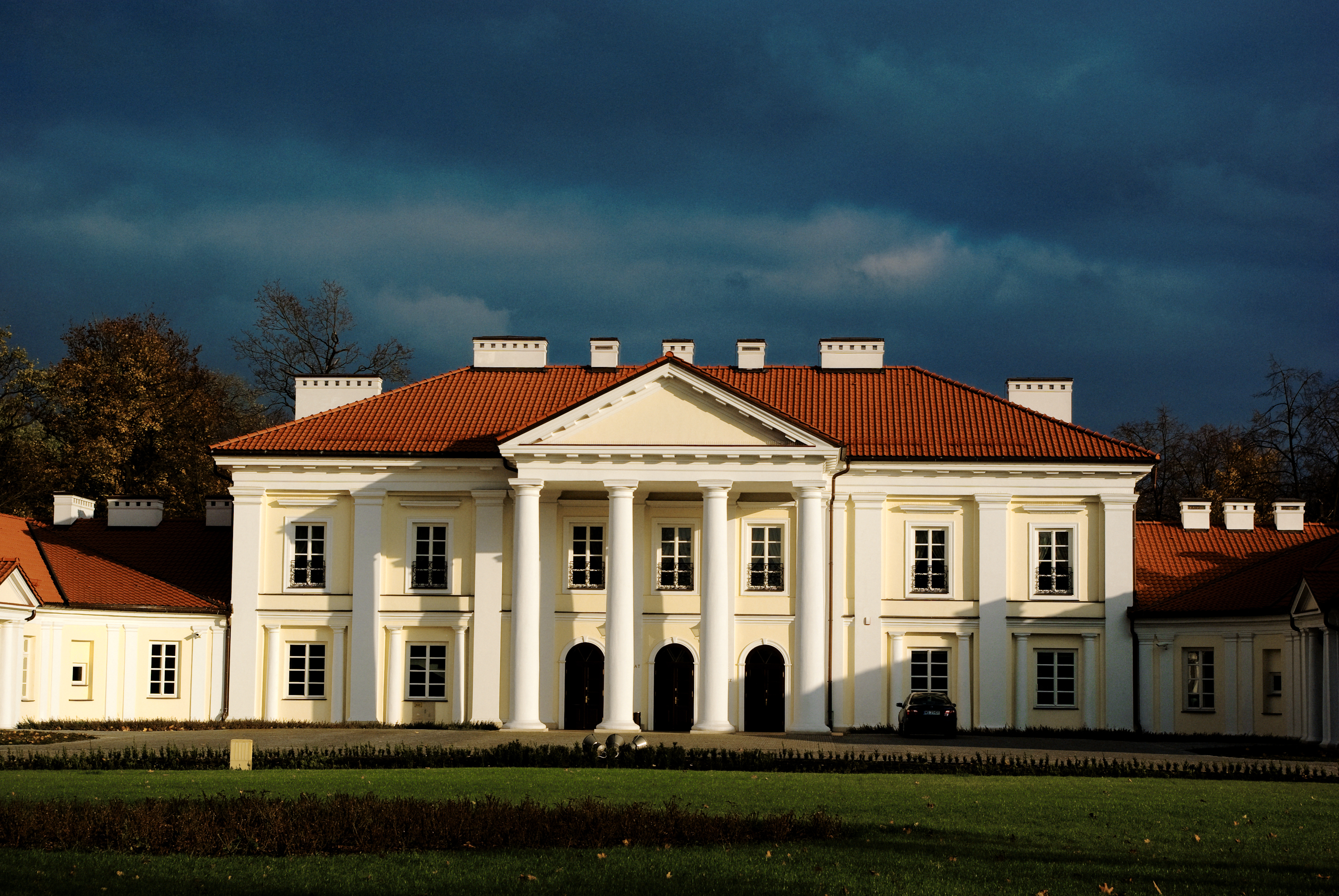
- Latin: Universitas Siedlecensis
- Type: Public
- Established: 1969
- Affiliations: Socrates-Erasmus Siedlce University (Poland)
- Rector: Professor Mirosław Minkina
- Students: 4,397 (12.2023)
- Location: Konarskiego 2, Siedlce 08-110, Poland., Siedlce, Poland; 52°10′11″N 22°17′03″E
- Campus: Urban
- Website: www.uph.edu.pl

The Siedlce University (Polish: Uniwersytet w Siedlcach) is a higher-education institution in Siedlce, Poland. It was created on October 1, 2010, by the decision of Sejm signed by the President of the Republic of Poland, Bronisław Komorowski. The previous name of the university was 'Akademia Podlaska w Siedlcach', in English known officially as University of Podlasie.

== History ==
The institution officially began in 1969 with the establishment of the Higher Teacher Training College (Wyższa Szkoła Nauczycielska) in Siedlce. The college provided new cultural and social development opportunities and easier access to higher education for young people from the Podlasie and north-eastern Mazovian areas. It also laid the groundwork for developing a scientific center in Siedlce.

In 1974, the college was transformed into the Higher School of Pedagogy (Wyższa Szkoła Pedagogiczna). This change enhanced the school's status by granting authority to have programs for teachers at the master's degree level.

Further restructuring occurred in 1977 when the institution became the Agricultural and Pedagogical University (Wyższa Szkoła Rolniczo-Pedagogiczna). New, typically vocational fields of study were offered in engineering, master's, and master's engineering levels alongside the existing teacher training programs. The university encountered political complexities of the time, including student strikes in 1980 and challenges during martial law. A controversial decision was made in 1984 to adopt the name Georgi Dimitrov, a figure in the communist movement. This allowed the university to maintain operations, though this selection was reversed in 1993 when the Sejm, at the request of the university authorities, removed the communist patron from its name. In 1992, the university became the first institution in Poland to experiment with inclusive education for individuals with disabilities.

In 1999, the institution achieved another milestone and was renamed Akademia Podlaska (University of Podlasie). It comprised three faculties (Chemical-Mathematical, Agricultural, and Humanities), and it held doctoral rights in four fields, with habilitation rights in one. The university offered 10 fields of study and 16 specializations, reflecting its growing academic profile. The Faculty of Management was established in 2000, further broadening the institution's offerings.

By 2010, the university's educational offerings had expanded to include 20 first-cycle (bachelor's) and 14 second-cycle (master's) fields of study, along with approximately 30 postgraduate programs. This growth resulted from the development of its scientific and research staff and a response to the region's demand for personnel. The historic 18th-century Ogiński Palace became the seat of the university administration in 2007.

The most significant transformation occurred on October 1, 2010, when, by decision of the Sejm and signed by the President of the Republic of Poland, Bronisław Komorowski, Akademia Podlaska was granted full university status and renamed Uniwersytet Przyrodniczo-Humanistyczny w Siedlcach (Siedlce University of Natural Sciences and Humanities). This new name reflected its comprehensive academic profile, encompassing natural sciences and humanities.

In 2023, the university underwent a further simplification of its name, becoming Uniwersytet w Siedlcach (Siedlce University).

== Academics ==
The Siedlce University offers a wide range of bachelor's and master's degree programs, including some in English. It is organized into four faculties: Natural Sciences, Humanities, Exact Sciences, Law and Economics Studies. The university is eligible to grant doctoral degrees in agronomy, biology, chemistry, history, safety science and zoology. It actively participates in international educational and research projects, hosting visiting professors and engaging in cultural exchange.

The university was the first in Poland to introduce an 'inclusive' higher education system in the 1990s.
