= Jerzy Prószyński =

Polish arachnologist (born 1935)

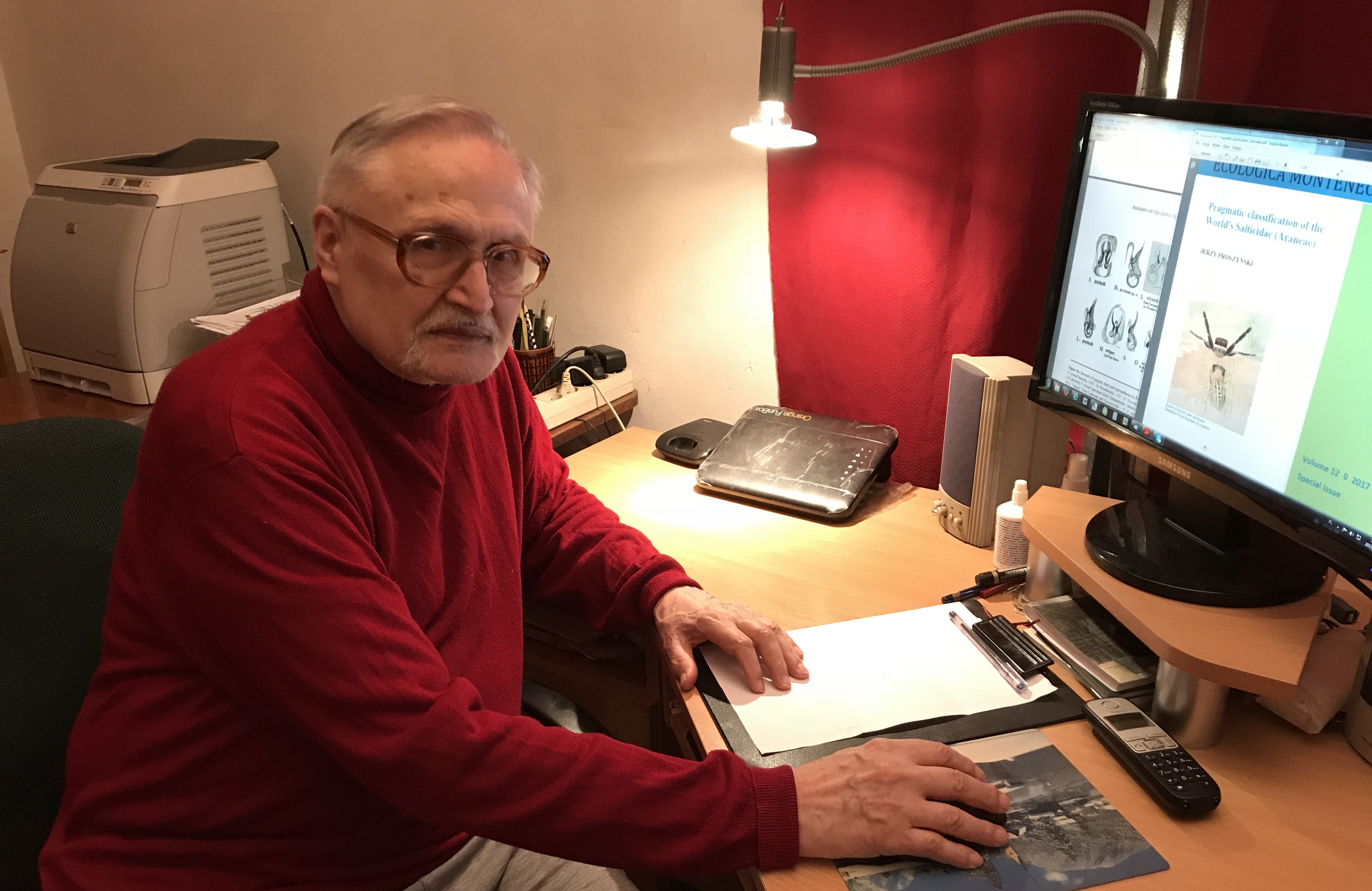
- Prószyński in 2017
- Born: 1935 (age 90–91); Warsaw, Poland
- Education: University of Warsaw; Adam Mickiewicz University in Poznań
- Spouse: Ekaterina Andreeva
- Scientific career
- Fields: Arachnology, particularly Salticidae
- Workplaces: Siedlce University of Natural Sciences and Humanities; Institute of Zoology of the Polish Academy of Sciences
- Author abbrev. (zoology): Prószyński

Jerzy Prószyński (born 1935) is a Polish arachnologist specializing in systematics of jumping spiders (family Salticidae). He is a graduate of the University of Warsaw, a long-term employee of the Siedlce University of Natural Sciences and Humanities and the Institute of Zoology of the Polish Academy of Sciences in Warsaw.

== Biography ==
In 1957, Prószyński completed his biological studies at the University of Warsaw. During his studies he was employed at the Institute of Zoology of the Polish Academy of Sciences in Warsaw, where he conducted research on spiders in the Kampinos Forest. Between 1963 and 1967, he lectured on zoology at the University of Ghana. In 1966 he obtained his Ph.D. at the Adam Mickiewicz University in Poznań. A year later he was given the opportunity to pursue a postdoctoral fellowship at Harvard University, but he was refused a passport.

In 1972, Prószyński was employed at the Higher School of Education in Siedlce (later the Siedlce University of Natural Sciences and Humanities), where he headed up the newly created Faculty of Biology.

In 1992, Prószyński was re-employed at the Institute of Zoology of the Polish Academy of Sciences in Warsaw.

== Scientific achievements ==
Since 1960, Prószyński's scientific activity has focused on the taxonomy, systematics and biogeography of jumping spiders. He is the author of several dozen scientific publications and academic textbooks and of an online database of the Salticidae of the world. As of October 2025, the World Spider Catalog listed 51 genus names and 221 species names or synonyms of which he is either a co-author or the sole author.

In 2010, Prószyński received the Pierre Bonnet Award for outstanding achievements in the field of arachnology.
