= Marek Michał Żabka =

Polish arachnologist (born 1955)

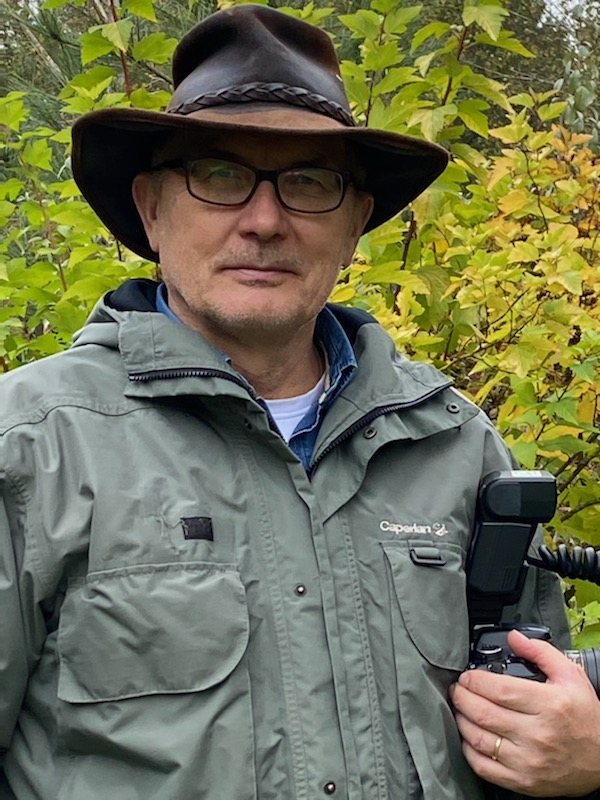
- Marek Żabka in 2020
- Born: 1955 (age 70–71)
- Education: Siedlce University of Agriculture and Pedagogy (Wyższa Szkoła Rolniczo-Pedagogiczna); Adam Mickiewicz University in Poznań
- Scientific career
- Fields: Arachnology
- Workplaces: Siedlce University of Natural Sciences and Humanities
- Author abbrev. (zoology): Żabka

Marek Michał Żabka (born 1955) is a Polish arachnologist. His main research area is the spider family Salticidae (jumping spiders), especially their systematics and biogeography. He has produced nearly 80 scientific publications, popular science articles and a book. The World Spider Catalog lists 25 genus names or synonyms and 237 species names or synonyms of which he is either the sole author or a co-author. Nine jumping spider species and one ant spider species have been given the specific name zabkai.

He received a master's degree in biology in 1978 from the Higher School of Agriculture and Pedagogy (Wyższa Szkoła Rolniczo-Pedagogiczna) in Siedlce – now the Siedlce University of Natural Sciences and Humanities. He then worked there, first as an assistant and then as adjunct professor. In 1984, he was awarded a PhD in biological sciences by the Department of Earth Sciences and Biology at the Adam Mickiewicz University in Poznań under the supervision of Jerzy Prószyński. He became a full professor at the Siedlce University of Natural Sciences and Humanities in 2006, and served as the head of the Department of Zoology and as the director of the Institute of Biology. He had various internships abroad, including at the Queensland Museum, the Australian Museum, the Humboldt University of Berlin and the University of Papua New Guinea.

== See also ==
- Category:Taxa named by Marek Michał Żabka
