= Thiratoscirtus mastigophorus =

Scientific classification
- Kingdom: Animalia
- Phylum: Arthropoda
- Subphylum: Chelicerata
- Class: Arachnida
- Order: Araneae
- Infraorder: Araneomorphae
- Family: Salticidae
- Genus: Thiratoscirtus
- Species: T. mastigophorus

Binomial name
- Thiratoscirtus mastigophorus Wiśniewski & Wesołowska, 2013

Species of jumping spider

Thiratoscirtus mastigophorus is a species of jumping spider, a member of the family Salticidae, that lives in the forests of the Democratic Republic of the Congo. A member of the genus Thiratoscirtus, it is a small spider, with a cephalothorax that is typically between 1.8 and 1.9 mm long and an abdomen that is 1.7 and 2.2 mm in length. The female is larger than the male. It is generally brown on top with a darker eye field and light brown or greyish-brown underneath. The spider has brownish legs. Although some have yellow patches. The front pair of legs are longer, stouter and darker than the others. In many of its physical attributes, it is similar to other species in the genus. However, compared to Thiratoscirtus bipaniculus and Thiratoscirtus kalisia, with which it has many similarities, the spider can be identified by the structure of its copulatory organs. The male is particularly distinctive as it has a long whip-like embolus that springs from the base of the palpal bulb and follows an unusual path to end near the top of the cymbium. The shape of the embolus is referenced in the species name, which is derived from Greek words meaning 'whip' and 'one bearing a whip'. The species was first described in 2013.

== Taxonomy ==
Thiratoscirtus mastigophorus is a species of jumping spider, a member of the family Salticidae, that was first described by the arachnologists Konrad Wiśniewski and Wanda Wesołowska in 2013. The holotype is stored at the Royal Museum of Central Africa in Tervuren, Belgium. It was one of over 500 species described by Wesołowska during her career, making her one of the most prolific in the field. It has a name derived from two Greek words, mastig, which can be translated 'whip, lash or scourge' and phooros, which can be translated as 'one bearing a whip'. This relates to the male spider's embolus, part of its copulatory organs.

Wiśniewski and Wesołowska allocated the spider to the genus Thiratoscirtus, first circumscribed in 1909 by Eugène Simon. The genus is very diverse and contains many monophyletic groups. Phylogenetic analysis has shown that the genus is related to the genera Alfenus, Bacelarella, Longarenus and Malloneta. It is likely to have diverged between 16.3 and 18.7 million years ago. The genus is closely related to Nimbarus. In 2012, Mellissa Bodner and Wayne Maddison proposed a subfamily Thiratoscirtinae for the genus and its related genera. This overlapped with a group of genera named Thiratoscirtines after the genus, created by Jerzy Prószyński in 2017. Thiratoscirtus is a member of the subtribe Thiratoscirtina in the tribe Aelurillini. Maddison allocated the tribe to the subclade Simonida in the clade Saltafresia in the clade Salticoida.

== Description ==
Thiratoscirtus mastigophorus is a small spider with distinctive physical features. The spider's body is divided into two main parts: an ovoid forward section or cephalothorax and, to the rear of that, an oval abdomen. Males of this species have a cephalothorax measuring typically 1.9 mm (0.07 in) in length and 1.5 mm (0.06 in) in width. The carapace, the hard upper part of the cephalothorax, is high with a slight slope down the back. It is generally brown with a v-shaped marking on the top. The spider's eye field is dark brown with a black area around the eyes themselves. Small fawn scales encircle some of the eyes. White hairs form thin streaks on the edges of the carapace and the underside of the cephalothorax, or sternum, is light brown. The spider's face, known as the clypeus, is low.

The spider has stout chelicerae that are short and brown. Its other mouthparts are similar in colour, tending to dark brown to yellowish fringes to the maxillae. The male's abdomen is an elongated ovoid that measures typically 1.7 mm (0.07 in) in length and 1.2 mm (0.05 in) in width. The upperside is mainly brownish with a light band running down its middle that breaks up into chevrons towards the back. There are two stripes along the sides while the underside is greyish-brown. The spider's spinnerets are yellowish with some parts darker than others. Its legs are brownish with yellowish patches visible on some examples. The front pair of legs are darker, longer, stouter, and armed with noticeable spines. Its pedipalps, sensory organs near the mouth, are yellow.

The female is generally similar to the male. Its carapace is slightly shorter, being 1.8 mm (0.07 in) long and 1.5 mm (0.06 in) wide, and darker. The eye field is more uniform and darker with streaks of white hair to the back. The abdomen is larger than the male, typically measuring 2.2 mm (0.09 in) in length and 1.7 mm (0.07 in) in width. It also has a distinctively different design. The top is covered in a mosaic of small brown and yellowish patches, which make an uneven pattern, and a series of chevrons to the rear.

The spider is best distinguished from related species by its copulatory organs. The male's long whip-like embolus, referenced in the specific name, is a clear determining feature. It sprouts from the bottom of the spider's palpal bulb, circles around the bottom and sides to curve and follow the line of the cymbium nearly to its end. Its palpal bulb is small and round with a pronounced lobe sticking out of its side. Its cymbium is narrow and has small hairs at its top. It has a relatively small palpal tibia that has a slightly curved protrusion, or tibial apophysis.

The female has a long epigyne with a noticeable depression in the middle to the front. Behind this, there is a structure than shows significant sclerotization, as does the v-shaped edge at the very back of the epigyne. Two copulatory openings can be found at the back of the depression, which lead to short thick insemination ducts and large spherical spermathecae, or receptacles. Compared to other species, the central depression of the epigyne, although similar to Thiratoscirtus bipaniculus and Thiratoscirtus kalisia, is distinctive. Thiratoscirtus mastigophorus also has shorter, wider insemination ducts.

== Distribution and habitat ==
Thiratoscirtus spiders generally live in Africa and are particularly common in the forests of Central and West Africa. Thiratoscirtus mastigophorus is endemic to the Democratic Republic of Congo. The male holotype was found near Butembo in 1975 in suspended soil. Other specimens have been found nearby. Female paratypes have also been seen in other parts of Kivu. It inhabits forest environments, where it is associated with epiphytic plants, at altitudes of between 1,700 and 1,750 m (5,580 and 5,740 ft) above sea level. The species lives amongst epiphytic plants.
