= Thiratoscirtus harpago =

Scientific classification
- Kingdom: Animalia
- Phylum: Arthropoda
- Subphylum: Chelicerata
- Class: Arachnida
- Order: Araneae
- Infraorder: Araneomorphae
- Family: Salticidae
- Genus: Thiratoscirtus
- Species: T. harpago

Binomial name
- Thiratoscirtus harpago Wesołowska & Russell-Smith, 2011

Species of spider

Thiratoscirtus harpago is a species of jumping spider in the genus Thiratoscirtus that lives in Nigeria. The species was first described in 2011 by Wanda Wesołowska and Russell-Smith. Only the male has been identified. It is a medium-sized spider, with a cephalothorax that is typically 3.9 mm long and an abdomen that is 2.7 mm in length, both oval in shape. The carapace is generally dark brown and the abdomen dark greyish-fawn on top. The clypeus, or face, has a triangular marking of white hairs. The mouthparts include large chelicerae and a short fang. Its copulatory organs are unusual, including the a very small palpal bulb enclosed in a cymbium that is shaped like a half-moon and a hook at the end of the embolus, which is recalled in the species name, a Latin word that can be translated "harpoon".

== Taxonomy ==
Thiratoscirtus harpago is a species of jumping spider that was first described by Wanda Wesołowska and Russell-Smith in 2011. They allocated the spider to the genus Thiratoscirtusfirst circumscribed in 1909 by Eugène Simon. The genus is very diverse and contains many monophyletic groups.

Thiratoscirtus is a member of the subtribe Thiratoscirtina in the tribe Aelurillini. The genus is closely related to Nimbarus. In 2012, Mellissa Bodner and Maddison proposed a subfamily Thiratoscirtinae for the genus and its related genera. This overlapped with a group of genera named Thiratoscirtines after the genus, created by Jerzy Prószyński in 2017. Phylogenetic analysis has shown that the genus is related to the genera Alfenus, Bacelarella, Longarenus and Malloneta. It is likely to have diverged between 16.3 and 18.7 million years ago. Wayne Maddison allocated the tribe to the subclade Simonida in the clade Saltafresia in the clade Salticoida. The species is named after a Latin word that can be translated "harpoon" and recalls the shape of the spider's embolus.

== Description ==
Thiratoscirtus harpago is a medium-sized spider with unique physical features. The spider's body is divided into two main parts: a cephalothorax and an abdomen. Males of this species have a cephalothorax measuring typically 3.9 mm (0.15 in) in length and 2.9 mm (0.11 in) in width. The hard upper part of the cephalothorax, or carapace, is a moderately high oval that slopes to the back. It is generally dark brown with a covering of very short brown hairs. The spider's eye field is short with reddish-fawn hairs and longer bristles present near the eyes themselves.

The spider's face, known as the clypeus, is brown with triangular marking formed of white hairs. The mouthparts include very large chelicerae, with a short fang that has a wide base and a single tooth, and maxillae that are characterised by two wing-shaped blobs similar to Thiratoscirtus yorubanus. Its abdomen is an oval that is typically 2.7 mm (0.11 in) in length and 2 mm (0.08 in) in width. The upper part is a dark greyish-fawn oval and the underside grey with a darker band across the middle. There is a scattering of brown bristles on its surface. The spider's legs are generally brown with brown hairs and spines. The front two pairs of legs are darker than the others.

The spider has distinctive copulatory organs. The male has lhairy pedipalps, sensory organs near the mouth, and a clump of brown hairs in the palpal tibia. The tibia has a curvy protrusions, or tibial apophyses. The cymbium is narrow and long, shaped like a half-moon and enclosing a very small rounded palpal bulb. The bulb has a very large bulge at the bottom and a long thin embolus at the top, which hooks around the top of the bulb and extends into the cymbium. It most closely resembles the related Thiratoscirtus tenuis, but differs in the shape of palpal bulb. The female has not been described.

== Distribution and habitat ==
Thiratoscirtus spiders generally live in Africa and are particularly common in the forests of Central and West Africa. Thiratoscirtus harpago is endemic to Nigeria. The holotype was found in Ibadan, in 1974 living in forest near a river amongst fallow bush.
