= Thiratoscirtus efik =

Scientific classification
- Kingdom: Animalia
- Phylum: Arthropoda
- Subphylum: Chelicerata
- Class: Arachnida
- Order: Araneae
- Infraorder: Araneomorphae
- Family: Salticidae
- Genus: Thiratoscirtus
- Species: T. efik

Binomial name
- Thiratoscirtus efik Wesołowska & Edwards, 2012

Species of spider

Thiratoscirtus efik is a species of jumping spider in the genus Thiratoscirtus that lives in Nigeria. The species was first described in 2012 by Wanda Wesołowska and Glavis Edwards. The spider is named for the Efik people that live near where it was first found. It is a medium-sized spider, with a cephalothorax that is between 2.4 and 2.5 mm long and an abdomen that is 2.2 mm in length, both oval in shape. It is generally brown, apart from its abdomen, which is brownish-grey, with a covering of fine hairs. The male has pedipalps that are similar to the related Thiratoscirtus elgonensis and Thiratoscirtus obudu but differ in details, including the size of the spike on the palpal tibia known as the tibial apophysis.

== Taxonomy ==
Thiratoscirtus efik is a species of jumping spider that was first described by Wanda Wesołowska and Glavis Edwards in 2012. One of over 500 different species identified by Wesołowska in her career, it is named for the Efik people who live in the area where it was first found. They allocated the spider to the genus Thiratoscirtus, first circumscribed in 1909 by Eugène Simon. The genus is very diverse and contains many monophyletic groups.

Thiratoscirtus is a member of the subtribe Thiratoscirtina in the tribe Aelurillini. The genus is closely related to Nimbarus. In 2012, Mellissa Bodner and Wayne Maddison proposed a subfamily Thiratoscirtinae for the genus and its related genera. This overlapped with a group of genera named Thiratoscirtines after the genus, created by Jerzy Prószyński in 2017. Phylogenetic analysis has shown that the genus is related to the genera Alfenus, Bacelarella, Longarenus and Malloneta. It is likely to have diverged between 16.3 and 18.7 million years ago. Maddison allocated the tribe to the subclade Simonida in the clade Saltafresia in the clade Salticoida.

== Description ==
Thiratoscirtus efik is a medium-sized spider. The spider's body is divided into two main parts:a cephalothorax and an abdomen. The cephalothorax measures typically between 2.4 and 2.5 mm (0.09 and 0.10 in) in length and 2 mm (0.08 in) in width. The carapace, the hard upper part of the cephalothorax, is a broad oval that is high with a sloping rear. It is generally brown and covered in fine colourless hairs with black rings and long bristles around its eyes. The sternum, the underside of the cephalothorax, is brown. Its face, or clypeus, is very low. Its mouthparts are brown, with a triangular lobe on the outside of the maxillae, and its chelicerae have two teeth at the front and one at the back.

The spider's abdomen is a small oval that measures typically 2.2 mm (0.09 in) long and between 1.1 and 1.4 mm (0.04 and 0.06 in) wide. It is brownish-grey and covered in fine hairs, with few brown bristles at its edges. The spider's spinnerets are greyish and its legs are dark brown with pronounced spines scattered on the first pair. The pedipalps, sensory organs near the mouth, are small and covered in long dense dark hairs. The male copulatory organs include a rounded hairy cymbium that surrounds the smaller palpal bulb, which has a noticeable bulge on its top accompanied by a fine embolus that curves up towards the edge of the cymbium. There is a very small spike on its palpal tibia, or tibial apophysis, which ends in a curved point. The pedipalp is very similar to the related Thiratoscirtus obudu, but the embolus is longer and the tibial apophysis is thinner. In comparison, the embolus and tibial apophysis are smaller than those Thiratoscirtus elgonensis. The female has not been described.

== Distribution ==
Thiratoscirtus spiders generally live in Africa and are particularly common in the forests of Central and West Africa. Thiratoscirtus efik is endemic to Nigeria. The female holotype was found outside Calabar in Cross River State near the road at the edge of rainforest.
