= Thiratoscirtus procerus =

Scientific classification
- Kingdom: Animalia
- Phylum: Arthropoda
- Subphylum: Chelicerata
- Class: Arachnida
- Order: Araneae
- Infraorder: Araneomorphae
- Family: Salticidae
- Genus: Thiratoscirtus
- Species: T. procerus

Binomial name
- Thiratoscirtus procerus Wesołowska & Edwards, 2012

Species of spider

Thiratoscirtus procerus is a species of jumping spider in the genus Thiratoscirtus that lives in Nigeria. The species was first described in 2012 by Wanda Wesołowska and Glavis Edwards. It is a medium-sized spider with a slender body, which is recalled in the name, that is more reminiscent of a spider in the genus Brancus. It has a cephalothorax that is between 3.2 and 3.3 mm long and a larger abdomen that is between 4.4 and 5.6 mm in length, both oval in shape. The top of the cephalothorax, or carapace, is yellowish-orange and the bottom, or sternum, is yellow. The top of the abdomen is yellowish was an orange pattern and the bottom is yellowish-white. The spider's legs are also yellow. They are long and thin and have very long brown spines. The female has copulatory organs that are typical for the genus. The male has not been described.

== Taxonomy ==
Thiratoscirtus procerus is a species of jumping spider that was first described by Wanda Wesołowska and Glavis Edwards in 2012. It is one of over 500 different species identified by Wesołowska in her career, making her the most prolific author in the discipline since Eugène Simon, who first circumscribed the genus Thiratoscirtus in 1909. Although it has a body shape that is more similar to members of the genus Brancus than Thiratoscirtus, they allocated the spider to the latter on the basis of the similarity of the female copulatory organs to others in the genus, particularly the spine on the tarsus of the pedipalp, sensory organs near the mouth.

Thiratoscirtus is very diverse and contains many monophyletic groups. It is a member of the subtribe Thiratoscirtina in the tribe Aelurillini. The genus is closely related to Nimbarus. In 2012, Mellissa Bodner and Maddison proposed a subfamily Thiratoscirtinae for the genus and its related genera. This overlapped with a group of genera named Thiratoscirtines after the genus, created by Jerzy Prószyński in 2017. Phylogenetic analysis has shown that the genus is related to the genera Alfenus, Bacelarella, Longarenus and Malloneta. It is likely to have diverged between 16.3 and 18.7 million years ago. Wayne Maddison allocated the tribe to the subclade Simonida in the clade Saltafresia in the clade Salticoida.

== Description ==
Thiratoscirtus procerus is a medium-sized spider with an elongated, slender body. The spider's body is divided into two main parts: a cephalothorax and an abdomen. Females of this species have a cephalothorax that is between 3.2 and 3.3 mm (0.13 and 0.13 in) long and 2.3 and 2.4 mm (0.09 and 0.09 in) wide. The carapace, the hard upper part of the cephalothorax, is a yellowish-orange oval. The spider's eye field is lighter with dark rings and dense fawn hairs near the eyes themselves. The underside of the cephalothorax, or sternum, is yellow. The spider's face, or clypeus, is orange and low. Its mouthparts are yellow, and its chelicerae are light brown with two teeth at the front and one at the back.

The spider's abdomen is larger than the cephalothorax and measures between 4.4 and 5.6 mm (0.17 and 0.22 in) in length and 1.5 and 1.8 mm (0.06 and 0.07 in) in width. It is similarly dark underneath, with a few lighter markings. The top of the abdomen is distinctive and yellowish with a pattern of two thin lines and four spots formed of orange hairs, the remainder covered in light hairs. The underside is yellowish-white with a clump of dark hairs visible to the back. The spider's spinnerets are long and pale. It has long, thin, yellow legs that have very long brown spines and pale hairs. There is also a spine on the pedipalp. The female copulatory organs include an external epigyne that is oval with a large shallow depression in the middle that is split in two by a ridge. There are two copulatory openings near the back of the epigyne that lead to relatively short insemination ducts that have slight sclerotization near their entrance. The ducts lead to thin tube-like spermathecae, or receptacles. These are placed closer to the back of the epigyne than the otherwise similar Thiratoscirtus gambari. The male has not been described.

== Distribution ==
Thiratoscirtus spiders generally live in Africa and are particularly common in the forests of Central and West Africa. Thiratoscirtus procerus is endemic to Nigeria. The female holotype was found near Calabar in Cross River State near a temporary stream.
