= Thiratoscirtus atakpa =

Scientific classification
- Kingdom: Animalia
- Phylum: Arthropoda
- Subphylum: Chelicerata
- Class: Arachnida
- Order: Araneae
- Infraorder: Araneomorphae
- Family: Salticidae
- Genus: Thiratoscirtus
- Species: T. atakpa

Binomial name
- Thiratoscirtus atakpa Wesołowska & Edwards, 2012

Species of spider

Thiratoscirtus atakpa is a species of jumping spider in the genus Thiratoscirtus that lives in Nigeria. The species was first described in 2012 by Wanda Wesołowska and Glavis Edwards and named for an old name for Calabar, the city near where it was first found. Only the female has been described. It is a medium-sized spider, with a cephalothorax that is typically 2.6 mm long and an abdomen that is 2.5 mm in length, both oval in shape. It is generally dark brown, apart from its abdomen, which is brownish-grey. This abdomen helps distinguish it from the otherwise similar Thiratoscirtus vilis. The position of the copulatory openings, in the middle of the spider's epigyne, is also distinctive.

== Taxonomy ==
Thiratoscirtus atakpa is a species of jumping spider that was first described by Wanda Wesołowska and Glavis Edwards in 2012. One of over 500 different species identified by Wesołowska in her career, it is named for an older name for the city of Calabar in the Efik language. They allocated the spider to the genus Thiratoscirtus, first circumscribed in 1909 by Eugène Simon. The genus is very diverse and contains many monophyletic groups.

Thiratoscirtus is a member of the subtribe Thiratoscirtina in the tribe Aelurillini. The genus is closely related to Nimbarus. In 2012, Mellissa Bodner and Maddison proposed a subfamily Thiratoscirtinae for the genus and its related genera. This overlapped with a group of genera named Thiratoscirtines after the genus, created by Jerzy Prószyński in 2017. Phylogenetic analysis has shown that the genus is related to the genera Alfenus, Bacelarella, Longarenus and Malloneta. It is likely to have diverged between 16.3 and 18.7 million years ago. Wayne Maddison allocated the tribe to the subclade Simonida in the clade Saltafresia in the clade Salticoida.

== Description ==
Thiratoscirtus atakpa is a medium-sized spider. The spider's body is divided into two main parts:a cephalothorax and an abdomen. Females of this species have a cephalothorax measuring typically 2.6 mm (0.1 in) in length and 2.1 mm (0.08 in) in width. The carapace, the hard upper part of the cephalothorax, is oval and high. It is generally dark brown with a black area around its eyes, the bottom of which has some white hairs. The underside of the cephalothorax, or sternum, is also dark brown. White hairs can also be found on the spider's face, known as the clypeus, which is low and also dark. Its mouthparts are dark brown, and its chelicerae have two teeth at the front and one at the back.

The spider's abdomen is an oval that measures typically 2.5 mm (0.1 in) long and 2 mm (0.08 in) wide. It is similarly dark underneath, with a few lighter markings. The top of the abdomen is distinctive, being brownish-grey and covered in translucent hairs, with few brown bristles scattered on its surface. The spider's spinnerets are dark grey and its legs are brown and very spiny. The pedipalps, sensory organs near the mouth, are brown. The female copulatory organs include an external epigyne that has a small central depression. There are two copulatory openings in the middle of the epigyne that lead to insemination ducts that have slight sclerotization. It is the positioning of the ducts, as well as the darker abdomen, that enables the species to be differentiated from the otherwise similar Thiratoscirtus vilis. The ducts lead to thin tube-like spermathecae, or receptacles, and accessory glands. The male has not been described.

== Distribution ==
Thiratoscirtus spiders generally live in Africa and are particularly common in the forests of Central and West Africa. Thiratoscirtus atakpa is endemic to Nigeria. The female holotype was found near Calabar in Cross River State.
