= Thiratoscirtus tenuis =

Scientific classification
- Kingdom: Animalia
- Phylum: Arthropoda
- Subphylum: Chelicerata
- Class: Arachnida
- Order: Araneae
- Infraorder: Araneomorphae
- Family: Salticidae
- Genus: Thiratoscirtus
- Species: T. tenuis

Binomial name
- Thiratoscirtus tenuis Wesołowska & Wiśniewski, 2023

Species of jumping spider

Thiratoscirtus tenuis is a species of jumping spider in the genus Thiratoscirtus that lives in Angola, Burundi, Mozambique and Uganda. It was first described in 2023 by Wanda Wesołowska and Konrad Wiśniewski. A medium-sized spider, it has a cephalothorax that is ranges from 3.3 and 3.6 mm long and an abdomen that is between 3 and 3.6 mm long. The cephalothorax is generally dark yellow to dark brown apart from its black rings around the spider's eyes. The abdomen is yellowish-brown to dark brown on top and generally yellowish underneath. The spider has long legs. The male has an unusually-shaped palpal bulb that has a bulge on top and a distinctive narrow cymbium. It is the shape of the cymbium that is recalled in the species name, which is the Latin word for narrow. The female has not been described.

== Taxonomy and etymology ==
Thiratoscirtus tenuis is a species of jumping spider, a member of the family Salticidae, that was first described by the arachnologists Wanda Wesołowska and Konrad Wiśniewski in 2023. One of over 500 different species identified by Wesołowska in her career, it has a species name that is a Latin word that can be translated "narrow" and relates to the shape of the cymbium. Although they considered that the species may be the same as Quadrica lamboji, they allocated the spider to the genus Thiratoscirtus, Thiratoscirtus had been first circumscribed in 1909 by Eugène Simon. The genus is very diverse and contains many monophyletic groups.

Thiratoscirtus is a member of the subtribe Thiratoscirtina in the tribe Aelurillini. The genus is closely related to Nimbarus. Wayne Maddison allocated the tribe to the subclade Simonida in the clade Saltafresia in the clade Salticoida. In 2016, Mellissa Bodner and Maddison proposed a subfamily Thiratoscirtinae for the genus and its related genera. This overlapped with a group of genera named Thiratoscirtines after the genus, created by Jerzy Prószyński in 2017. Phylogenetic analysis has shown that the genus is related to the genera Alfenus, Bacelarella, Longarenus and Malloneta. It is likely to have diverged between 16.3 and 18.7 million years ago.

== Description ==
Thiratoscirtus tenuis is a medium-sized spider. The spider's body is divided into two main parts: a cephalothorax and an abdomen. The male has a cephalothorax that measures between 3.3 and 3.6 mm (0.13 and 0.14 in) in length and 3 and 3.1 mm (0.12 and 0.12 in) in width. The carapace, the hard upper part of the cephalothorax, is a moderately high oval with a clear hump, or fovea, in the middle and a gentle slope towards the back. The majority of the carapace is yellowish-brown to dark brown and covered in short brown hairs. There are black rings around the spider's eyes along with white hairds and long bristles. The sternum, the underside of the cephalothorax, is dark yellow to brown. Its face, or clypeus, is low with a scattering of long bristles visible. Its mouthparts are also dark yellow to brown; the chelicerae have a short fang, two teeth at the front and a single large tooth at the back.

The spider's abdomen is narrower than the cephalothorax, measuring between 3 and 3 mm (0.12 in) long and 1.9 and 2.1 mm (0.07 and 0.08 in) wide. It is a generally yellowish-brown to dark brown on top, with a lighter band down the middle near the very rear. and covered in delicate hairs. The underside is generally yellowish apart from a wide grey streak. It is marked with a scattering of small black speckles on both the top and bottom. The spider's legs are distinctly long and mainly yellowish-brown with dense hairs and spines. The pedipalps, sensory organs near the mouth, are yellow with a dense covering of long brown hairs.

Thiratoscirtus tenuis has unusual copulatory organs that distinguish the species from others in the genus. On the male, these include a long, curved, narrow and hairy cymbum that surrounds an unusually small palpal bulb. The bulb has a membranous bulge projecting from the top. A long curved projection, or embolus, extends from its side and branches out to follow the curve of the cymblum. apophysis. The small palpal tibia has a single curved spike, or tibial apophysis, and clumps of long hairs. The shape of the palpal bulb, and particularly its noticeable bulge, is characteristic of the species. The shape of the palpal bulb is somewhat similar to the related Thiratoscirtus oberleuthneri, although that species has a membranous substance that surrounds its embolus, a feature that distinguishes that spider. The long narrow cymbium is similar to Thiratoscirtus harpago, but that spider has a very different, more round palpal bulb. The female has not been described.

== Distribution ==
Thiratoscirtus spiders generally live in Africa and are particularly common in the forests of Central and West Africa. Thiratoscirtus tenuis lives in Angola, Burundi, Mozambique and Uganda. The holotype was found near Tete In Mozambique. It may also be found in Gabon and is likely to have a wide species distribution across Africa.
