= Thiratoscirtus oberleuthneri =

Scientific classification
- Kingdom: Animalia
- Phylum: Arthropoda
- Subphylum: Chelicerata
- Class: Arachnida
- Order: Araneae
- Infraorder: Araneomorphae
- Family: Salticidae
- Genus: Thiratoscirtus
- Species: T. oberleuthneri

Binomial name
- Thiratoscirtus oberleuthneri Seiter & Wesołowska, 2015

Species of spider

Thiratoscirtus oberleuthneri is a species of jumping spider in the genus Thiratoscirtus that lives in the rainforests of Gabon. It was first described in 2015 by Michael Seiter and Wanda Wesołowska. A medium-sized spider, it has a cephalothorax that is typically 3.3 mm long and an abdomen that is 3.4 mm long. The cephalothorax is generally brown apart from its darker eye field. The area around the eyes is black. The eye field is large, taking up nearly a half of the carapace, the hard upper part of the cephalothorax. The abdomen is also black on top but dark grey underneath. The spider has yellow stripes on its legs. The male has an unusually-shaped palpal bulb that has a membranous substance surrounding the embolus that projects from the top. The embolus is also accompanied by a large terminal apophysis, or spike. The female has not been described.

== Taxonomy ==
Thiratoscirtus oberleuthneri is a species of jumping spider, a member of the family Salticidae, that was first described by the arachnologists Michael Seiter and Wanda Wesołowska in 2015. One of over 500 different species identified by Wesołowska in her career, it is named for Aanton Oberleuthner who was involved in the discovery of the holotype. They allocated the spider to the genus Thiratoscirtus, which had been first circumscribed in 1909 by Eugène Simon. The genus is very diverse and contains many monophyletic groups.

Thiratoscirtus is a member of the subtribe Thiratoscirtina in the tribe Aelurillini. The genus is closely related to Nimbarus. Wayne Maddison allocated the tribe to the subclade Simonida in the clade Saltafresia in the clade Salticoida. In 2016, Mellissa Bodner and Maddison proposed a subfamily Thiratoscirtinae for the genus and its related genera. This overlapped with a group of genera named Thiratoscirtines after the genus, created by Jerzy Prószyński in 2017. Phylogenetic analysis has shown that the genus is related to the genera Alfenus, Bacelarella, Longarenus and Malloneta. It is likely to have diverged between 16.3 and 18.7 million years ago.

== Description ==
Thiratoscirtus oberleuthneri is a medium-sized spider. The spider's body is divided into two main parts: a cephalothorax and an abdomen. The male has a cephalothorax that measures typically 3.3 mm (0.13 in) in length and 2.6 mm (0.10 in) in width. The carapace, the hard upper part of the cephalothorax, is a moderately high oval with a clear furrow in the middle, or sulciform fovea, which forms the centre of a series of small marks that radiate outwards. The majority of the carapace is occupied by the spider's thorax, which is light brown with darker edges and covered with fine light hairs. The remainder is a large dark brown eye field, which takes up nearly a half of the carapace. The area near the eyes is black. The sternum, the underside of the cephalothorax, is light brown with dark edges. Its face, or clypeus, is low and brown. Its mouthparts are also brown, with large chelicerae with two teeth at the front and a single tooth at the back.

The spider's abdomen is narrower than the cephalothorax, measuring typically 3.4 mm (0.13 in) long and 1.8 mm (0.07 in) wide. It is a generally black and covered in dense brown short hairs. It is marked with a mosaic of long dots on the top and crossed by a serrated yellowish-white stripe, with a few brown bristles visible on the front edge. The underside is dark grey with a pattern of light dots that form four lines. The spider's spinnerets are black. The spider's legs are mainly brown with yellow stripes and brown hairs. The pedipalps, sensory organs near the mouth, are dark brown with a covering of dense long brown hairs.

Thiratoscirtus oberleuthneri has unusual copulatory organs that distinguish the species from others in the genus. On the male, these include a narrow cymbium that surrounds an unusually-shaped palpal bulb. The bulb is wider than it is high and has a noticeable curved projection, or embolus, that extends from its top. The embolus is surrounded by a membranous substance and is accompanied by a long spike-like protrusion called a terminal apophysis. Its palpal tibia is small with a long single slightly curved spike, or tibial apophysis, extending from one side and a clump of long hairs on the other. The shape of the tibial apophysis is unique to the species. The shape of the palpal bulb is somewhat similar to the related Thiratoscirtus tenuis, although that species lacks the membrane-like feature that distinguishes this spider. The female has not been described.

== Distribution and habitat ==
Thiratoscirtus spiders generally live in Africa and are particularly common in the forests of Central and West Africa. Thiratoscirtus oberleuthneri is endemic to Gabon. The holotype was found near Midzic at an altitude of 329 m (1,079 ft) above sea level living near a river. The holotype was found living under leaves. No other examples have been seen in the wild. The spider was found living in lowland rainforest, where there is high humidity and temperatures of 33 °C (91 °F).
