= Pochyta tendicula =

Scientific classification
- Kingdom: Animalia
- Phylum: Arthropoda
- Subphylum: Chelicerata
- Class: Arachnida
- Order: Araneae
- Infraorder: Araneomorphae
- Family: Salticidae
- Genus: Pochyta
- Species: P. tendicula

Binomial name
- Pochyta tendicula Wesołowska & Szűts, 2021

Species of jumping spider

Pochyta tendicula is a species of jumping spider in the genus Pochyta that lives in Gabon. A small spider, it was first described in 2021 by Wanda Wesołowska and Tamás Szűts. It has a light brown oval cephalothorax that is typically 2.4 mm long and has eyes that are surrounded by dark rings. It has an ovoid abdomen, typically 2.2 mm long, that is generally greyish-beige on top and grey underneath. Its front pair of legs are longer than the others and marked with long spines. The male has distinctive copulatory organs, with a long embolus that projects from a small palpal bulb, and a small curved spike in the palpal tibia called a retrolateral tibial apophysis. The female has not been described.

== Taxonomy and etymology ==
Pochyta tendicula is a species of jumping spider, a member of the family Salticidae, that was first described by the arachnologists Wanda Wesołowska and Tamás Szűts in 2021. It is one of over 500 different species identified by Wesołowska in her career. The species name is the Latin word for a loop and refers to the shape of the male copulatory organs.

They allocated the spider to the genus Pochyta, which had been erected by Eugène Simon in 1901. Pochyta is a member of the subtribe Thiratoscirtina in the tribe Aelurillini. Wayne Maddison allocated the tribe to the subclade Simonida in the clade Saltafresia in the clade Salticoida. In 2016, Mellissa Bodner and Maddison proposed a subfamily Thiratoscirtinae for the genus and its related genera. The genus is also a member of a group of genera named Thiratoscirtines by Jerzy Prószyński in 2017. Phylogenetic analysis has shown that the genus is related to the genera Alfenus, Bacelarella, Longarenus and Malloneta. The genus is distinguished by the spines on its legs. It is likely to have diverged between 16.3 and 18.7 million years ago.

== Description ==
Pochyta tendicula is a small spider with a body that is divided into two main parts: an oval cephalothorax and a thinner abdomen. The male has a cephalothorax that has a typical length of 2.4 mm (0.09 in) and width of 1.9 mm (0.07 in). The carapace, the hard upper part of the cephalothorax, is high and generally light brown with darker edges. It is covered in short colourless hairs, apart from the fovea, or central depression, which has a few white hairs on it. It has black rings around its eyes and there are some long bristles and fawn hairs between some of them. The sternum, the underside of the cephalothorax, is light brown. Its mouthparts are brown with whitish tips and its chelicerae are large with two teeth to the front and one to the back.

The spider's abdomen is an ovoid that measures typically 2.2 mm (0.09 in) long and 1.3 mm (0.05 in) wide. The upper side is greyish-beige with a scattering of brown bristles and a pattern of round grey patches in the middle and white chevrons to the rear. The underside is generally grey. The spiders's spinnerets are greyish, Its legs are yellowish-brown with brown hairs and spines. The front pair of legs are longer than the others and have very long spines that are characteristic of the genus. The pedipalps, sensory organs near the mouth, are hairy, brown and slender.

Pochyta tendicula has distinctive copulatory organs. The male has a relatively large cymbium that nearly encloses a noticeably smaller palpal bulb. The bulb has a bulbous section that leads to a long embolus that projects out to the side, curls in a loop over the top of the bulb and then extends outwards following the profile of the cymbium. The palpal tibia is small and has a small retrolateral tibial apophysis, or curved spike that projects towards the cymbium. The shape of palpal organ enables the species to be distinguished from the related Pochyta fastibilis. The female has not been described.

== Distribution ==
Pochyta spiders generally live in Western equatorial Africa and are particularly common in area around the Gulf of Guinea. Pochyta tendicula is endemic to Gabon. The holotype was found in the Waka National Park in 2007 at an altitude of 420 m (1,380 ft) above sea level.
