= Pochyta lucida =

Scientific classification
- Kingdom: Animalia
- Phylum: Arthropoda
- Subphylum: Chelicerata
- Class: Arachnida
- Order: Araneae
- Infraorder: Araneomorphae
- Family: Salticidae
- Genus: Pochyta
- Species: P. lucida

Binomial name
- Pochyta lucida Wesołowska & Szűts, 2021

Species of jumping spider

Pochyta lucida is a species of jumping spider in the genus Pochyta that lives in Gabon. A small spider, it was first described in 2021 by Wanda Wesołowska and Tamás Szűts. It has an oval cephalothorax that is 2.3 mm long and an ovoid abdomen that is 2.8 mm long. It is generally light, with a yellow carapace and greyish-beige abdomen, which is recalled in the species name, which can be translated "light". The spider's eye field is orange and there are dark rings around the eyes themselves. It has yellow legs, the front pair having extremely long spines as is typical for the genus. The female has distinctive copulatory organs, with a noticeable ridge in the middle of its epigyne and short insemination ducts. The male has not been described.

== Taxonomy and etymology ==
Pochyta lucida is a species of jumping spider, a member of the family Salticidae, that was first described by the arachnologists Wanda Wesołowska and Tamás Szűts in 2021. It is one of over 500 different species identified by Wesołowska in her career. The species is named for a Latin word that can be translated "light" and relates to its colouration.

They allocated the spider to the genus Pochyta, which had been erected by Eugène Simon in 1901. Pochyta is a member of the subtribe Thiratoscirtina in the tribe Aelurillini. Wayne Maddison allocated the tribe to the subclade Simonida in the clade Saltafresia in the clade Salticoida. The species forms a clade with Pochyta equatorialis, Pochyta pulchra and Pochyta spinosa. In 2016, Mellissa Bodner and Maddison proposed a subfamily Thiratoscirtinae for the genus and its related genera. The genus is also a member of a group of genera named Thiratoscirtines by Jerzy Prószyński in 2017. Phylogenetic analysis has shown that the genus is related to the genera Alfenus, Bacelarella, Longarenus and Malloneta. The genus is distinguished by the spines on its legs. It is likely to have diverged between 16.3 and 18.7 million years ago.

== Description ==
Pochyta lucida is a small spider with a body that is divided into two main parts: an oval cephalothorax and a thinner abdomen. The female has a cephalothorax that has a length of typically 2.3 mm (0.09 in) and width of 1.7 mm (0.07 in). The carapace, the hard upper part of the cephalothorax, is high with a slope to the rear. It is generally yellow and covered in very fine hairs. The spider's eye field is orange and there are dark rings around the eyes themselves, which are particularly large and set on tubicles. There are long bristles near the eyes. The sternum, the underside of the cephalothorax, is light yellow, as are the spider's mouthparts.

The male spider's abdomen is a narrow ovoid that measures typically 2.8 mm (0.11 in) in length and 1.9 mm (0.07 in) in width. The upper side is greyish-beige with whitish pattern that consists of a serrated streak down the middle and long patches on the sides. It has no hairs. The underside is light grey. The spiders's spinnerets are light yellow. It has yellow legs. The first pair each have a single very long spine on the patella, eight extremely long spines on the tibia and six more on the metatarsus. These long spines are characteristic of the genus. The pedipalps, sensory organs near the mouth, also have a spine on their tarsus.

Pochyta lucida has distinctive copulatory organs. The female epigyne, the external part of the copulatory organs, is small and delicate. There is a shallow depression in the middle that is divided by a bulging ridge. There are two copulatory openings in the middle that lead to short insemination ducts that curve towards the spermathecae, or receptacles. The tongue-like ridge in the middle of the epigyne helps to distinguish the species from others in the genus. The male has not been described.

== Distribution and habitat ==
Pochyta spiders generally live in Western equatorial Africa and are particularly common in area around the Gulf of Guinea. Pochyta lucida is endemic to Gabon. The holotype was found near Tchimbélé in the Crystal Mountains in 2007 at an altitude of 600 m (2,000 ft) above sea level. The species lives in forests.
