= Thiratoscirtus elgonensis =

Scientific classification
- Kingdom: Animalia
- Phylum: Arthropoda
- Subphylum: Chelicerata
- Class: Arachnida
- Order: Araneae
- Infraorder: Araneomorphae
- Family: Salticidae
- Genus: Thiratoscirtus
- Species: T. elgonensis

Binomial name
- Thiratoscirtus elgonensis Dawidowicz & Wesołowska, 2016

Species of spider

Thiratoscirtus elgonensis is a species of jumping spider that lives in Kenya and Uganda. First described in 2016 by the arachnologists Angelika Dawidowicz and Wanda Wesołowska, it has only been found on Mount Elgon, after which it is named. A member of the genus Thiratoscirtus, it lives in bushes and moss, including members of the genera Acanthus and Dendrosenecio. It is a medium-sized spider, with a cephalothorax that is between 1.8 and 2.7 mm long and an abdomen that is between 2.0 and 2.8 mm in length, both oval in shape. It is generally brown with a central lighter streak running down both the carapace, the hard upper part of the cephalothorax, and the top of the abdomen until it ends in a series of chevrons. The area around its eyes is black and its face, or clypeus, is light brown. The male has pedipalps that are similar to the related Thiratoscirtus efik but differs in details, including the size of the spike on the palpal tibia known as the tibial apophysis. The female has a distinctive epigyne with a heart-shaped depression and wide insemination ducts.

== Taxonomy ==
Thiratoscirtus elgonensis is a species of jumping spider, a member of the family Salticidae, that was first described by the arachnologists Angelika Dawidowicz and Wanda Wesołowska in 2016. One of over 500 different species identified by Wesołowska in her career, it is named for the Mount Elgon, where it was first found. They allocated the spider to the genus Thiratoscirtus, first circumscribed in 1909 by Eugène Simon. The genus contains a diverse range of species that are part of many monophyletic groups.

Thiratoscirtus is a member of the subtribe Thiratoscirtina in the tribe Aelurillini. The genus is closely related to Nimbarus. Wayne Maddison allocated the tribe to the subclade Simonida in the clade Saltafresia in the clade Salticoida. In 2016, Mellissa Bodner and Maddison proposed a subfamily Thiratoscirtinae for the genus and its related genera. This overlapped with a group of genera named Thiratoscirtines after the genus, created by Jerzy Prószyński in 2017. Phylogenetic analysis has shown that the genus is related to the genera Alfenus, Bacelarella, Longarenus and Malloneta. It is likely to have diverged between 16.3 and 18.7 million years ago.

== Description ==
Thiratoscirtus elgonensis is a medium-sized spider with a body that is divided, like other jumping spiders, into two main parts: a forward section known as a cephalothorax and, behind that, an abdomen. The male has a cephalothorax that measures typically between 2.0 and 2.5 mm (0.08 and 0.10 in) in length and 1.6 and 1.9 mm (0.06 and 0.07 in) in width. Its carapace, the hard upper part of the cephalothorax, is a moderately high oval that is generally brown and covered in brown hair. It is marked with a light band across the middle and white streaks formed by hairs on the sides. There is a furrow-like depression in the centre of carapace. A black field surrounds the spider's eyes that is covered in black hairs, with a few longer brown bristles visible particularly around the forward eyes. The spider's sternum, the underside of its cephalothorax, is brown. Its face, or clypeus, is low and light brown with light hairs. Its mouthparts are brown, with paler tips on its labium and maxillae while its chelicerae are marked by having a single tooth at the back.

The male spider's abdomen is a small oval that measures between 2.1 and 2.7 mm (0.08 and 0.11 in) long and between 1.4 and 1.8 mm (0.06 and 0.07 in) wide. It is a generally brown oval with a pattern of yellowish chevrons towards the rear. The chevrons are covered in yellowish hairs, the remainder of the abdomen with brown hairs. The sides are whitish and the underside yellowish and marked with brown markings. The spider's spinnerets are light brown, as are its legs. Its legs have long thin brown hairs and a single spine.

The spider's pedipalps, sensory organs near the mouth, are small and covered in long dense hairs. The male copulatory organs include a rounded hairy cymbium that surrounds the smaller bean-like palpal bulb. A relatively long embolus extends from the middle of the bulb and curves around towards the top of its cymbium but finishes in a point before it reaches that point. Its palpal tibia is small and has a small single slightly curved spike, or tibial apophysis, extending from one side and a clump of long hairs on the other. Its pedipalp is very similar to the related Thiratoscirtus efik, but its embolus is longer and its tibial apophysis is larger.

The female is similar to the male in size with a cephalothorax that is measures typically between 1.8 and 2.7 mm (0.07 and 0.11 in) in length and a similar range of widths. Its carapace is generally lighter but has a similar pattern, with a lighter streak running down the middle. Between 2.0 and 2.5 mm long and between 1.5 mm (0.06 in) and 2.0 wide, its abdomen is brown with a single light irregularly-shaped streak running down the middle, finishing in a pattern of chevrons towards the rear. Its legs are a similar brown to the majority of the body.

The female's copulatory organs are distinctive with an epigyne that is particularly unusual and helps distinguish the species from others in the genus. It has a depression in the middle that is heart-shaped and is accompanied by two fissured insemination openings. There is also a single spine evident on its palpal tarsus. The openings lead via wide insemination ducts to two spermathecae, or receptacles, that have strong sclerotization, each with two chambers. The first chamber is curved and the second spherical.

== Distribution and habitat ==
Thiratoscirtus spiders generally live in Africa and are particularly common in the forests of Central and West Africa. Thiratoscirtus elgonensis lives in Kenya and Uganda. It has only been found on Mount Elgon. This is reflected in the specific name. The fact that the species, along with a number of other spiders including Belippo elgonensis, has a species distribution that is limited to the one mountain led to Dawidowicz and Wesołowska speculating that the area acts as a "centre of endemism".

The spider thrives in high altitudes. The holotype was at an altitude of 2,000 m (6,600 ft) above sea level, while others have been found as high as 3,580 m (11,750 ft). It is generally found living in vegetation. Some spiders live in moss underneath trees of genera like Alchemilla and Erica. Others live amongst bushes like Acanthus amongst forests of bamboo. One example was found on the giant groundsel Dendrosenecio johnstonii. Others have been seen living near the Sasa river.
