= Thiratoscirtus vilis =

Scientific classification
- Kingdom: Animalia
- Phylum: Arthropoda
- Subphylum: Chelicerata
- Class: Arachnida
- Order: Araneae
- Infraorder: Araneomorphae
- Family: Salticidae
- Genus: Thiratoscirtus
- Species: T. vilis

Binomial name
- Thiratoscirtus vilis Wesołowska & Russell-Smith, 2011

Species of spider

Thiratoscirtus vilis is a species of jumping spider in the genus Thiratoscirtus that lives in Nigeria. The species was first described in 2011 by Wanda Wesołowska and Russell-Smith. The holotype was found at an altitude of 1,900 m (6,200 ft) above sea level. on Obudu Plateau, Cross River State. Only the female has been described. It is a medium-sized spider, with a cephalothorax that is typically 3.4 mm long and an abdomen that is 3.5 mm in length, both oval in shape. The mouthparts include robust chelicerae and a short fang. It can be distinguished from other spiders in the genus by its copulatory organs, particularly the heart-shaped depression in the middle of the epigyne.

== Taxonomy ==
Thiratoscirtus vilis is a species of jumping spider that was first described by Wanda Wesołowska and Russell-Smith in 2011. They allocated the spider to the genus Thiratoscirtus, first circumscribed in 1909 by Eugène Simon. The genus is very diverse and contains many monophyletic groups.

Thiratoscirtus is a member of the subtribe Thiratoscirtina in the tribe Aelurillini. The genus is closely related to Nimbarus. In 2012, Mellissa Bodner and Maddison proposed a subfamily Thiratoscirtinae for the genus and its related genera. This overlapped with a group of genera named Thiratoscirtines after the genus, created by Jerzy Prószyński in 2017. Phylogenetic analysis has shown that the genus is related to the genera Alfenus, Bacelarella, Longarenus and Malloneta. It is likely to have diverged between 16.3 and 18.7 million years ago. Wayne Maddison allocated the tribe to the subclade Simonida in the clade Saltafresia in the clade Salticoida. The species is named for a Latin word that can be translated "paltry".

== Description ==
Thiratoscirtus vilis is a medium-sized spider with unique physical features. The spider's body is divided into two main parts: a cephalothorax and an abdomen, both which are ovals of a similar size. Females of this species have a cephalothorax measuring typically 3.4 mm (0.13 in) in length and 2.6 mm (0.10 in) in width. The hard upper part of the cephalothorax, or carapace, is a moderately high oval. It is generally brown with a covering of delicate hairs, interspersed with brown bristles. It has a pronounced depression in the centre of the carapace, or fovea, that is lighter. The spider's eye field dark with a scattering of long bristles near the eyes and black rings around the eyes themselves. The underside of the cephalothorax, or sternum, is a yellowish-orange.

The spider's face, known as the clypeus, is low and yellow. The mouthparts include thick dark brown chelicerae, with a short fang and a single tooth. The labium and maxillae are brownish with lighter ends. Its abdomen is typically 3.5 mm (0.14 in) in length and 2.5 mm (0.10 in) in width. The upper part is dark yellow with a covering of colorless hairs and scattering of longer bristles. There is a mosaic of dark grey patches on its surface. The lower part is light yellow. The spider's spinnerets are yellow and its legs are light brown with darker brown hairs.

The spider has distinctive copulatory organs. The female has a long spine on its pedipalp. The epigyne is elongated with a V-shaped edge at the very rear that shows strong signs of sclerotization. There are also two clumps of hair on the sides of the epigyne and a large depression shaped like a heart in the middle that is divided into two by a narrow ridge. The gonopores are placed in the pocket at the back. The two copulatory openings are relatively small and lead to slightly sclerotized insemination ducts and relatively small spermathecae, or receptacles, and large accessory glands. It resembles the related Thiratoscirtus bipaniculus, but differs in the shape of the epigynal depression. The male has not been described.

== Distribution ==
Thiratoscirtus spiders generally live in Africa and are particularly common in the forests of Central and West Africa. Thiratoscirtus vilis is endemic to Nigeria. The holotype was found on Obudu Plateau, Cross River State, in 1974 at an altitude of 1,900 m (6,200 ft) above sea level.
