= Quadrica lamboji =

Scientific classification
- Kingdom: Animalia
- Phylum: Arthropoda
- Subphylum: Chelicerata
- Class: Arachnida
- Order: Araneae
- Infraorder: Araneomorphae
- Family: Salticidae
- Genus: Quadrica
- Species: Q. lamboji

Binomial name
- Quadrica lamboji (Seiter & Wesołowska, 2015)

Synonyms
- Thiratoscirtus lamboji Seiter & Wesołowska, 2015

Species of jumping spider

Quadrica lamboji is the species of jumping spider in the monotypic genus Quadrica that lives in Angola, Gabon and Mozambique. It was originally known as Thiratoscirtus lamboji but was renamed in 2023. The spider often lives in forested areas, but has been found in sandy area near to rainforests where it is exposed to very high temperatures. It is a small spider with a carapace and abdomen that are each typically 2.6 mm (0.10 in) long. It is generally greyish-brown on top, with a black eye field, yellow fovea and lighter serrated streak running down the middle. It has red and reddish-fawn hairs near its eyes. It has yellow legs and pedipalps, the front legs being dark than the rest. The four spines on its pedipalp are recalled in its generic name. The female's copulatory organs have two oval depressions at the front of the epigyne and small spermathecae. The male has not been described but Wanda Wesołowska and Konrad Wiśniewski think that the spider known as Thiratoscirtus tenuis may be the male for this species.

== Taxonomy and etymology ==
Quadrica lamboji is a species of jumping spider, a member of the family Salticidae, that was first described by Michael Seiter and Wanda Wesołowska in 2015. One of over 500 different species identified by Wesołowska in her career, they allocated the spider to the genus Thiratoscirtus, first circumscribed in 1909 by Eugène Simon.

Thiratoscirtus is a member of the subtribe Thiratoscirtina in the tribe Aelurillini. The genus is closely related to Nimbarus. Wayne Maddison allocated the tribe to the subclade Simonida in the clade Saltafresia in the clade Salticoida. In 2016, Mellissa Bodner and Maddison proposed a subfamily Thiratoscirtinae for the genus and its related genera. This overlapped with a group of genera named Thiratoscirtines after the genus, created by Jerzy Prószyński in 2017. Phylogenetic analysis has shown that the genus is related to the genera Alfenus, Bacelarella, Longarenus and Malloneta. It is likely to have diverged between 16.3 and 18.7 million years ago.

Thiratoscirtus is recognised as very diverse and contains many monophyletic groups. In 2023, Wesołowska and Konrad Wiśniewski recognised that the genus contained a number of unrelated species. Particularly, they identified that Thiratoscirtus lamboji had four spines on the female pedipalp, unlike all other members of the genus that usually only have one. They therefore moved the spider to a new genus Quadrica, for which it is the type species. The new genus name is derived from the Latin word for four, recalling the number of spines. The specific name is in honour of Anton Lamboj, who assisted in the expedition to find the holotype.

== Description ==
Quadrica lamboji is a small spider that has a rounded cephalothorax and a larger slightly-swollen oval abdomen. Its cephalothorax measures typically 2.6 mm (0.10 in) in length, 1.8 mm (0.071 in) in width and 1.4 mm (0.055 in) in height. The female's carapace, the hard upper side of the cephalothorax, is oval and high with a furrow-like yellow fovea. It has a black eye field, behind which it slopes dramatically, and a yellow streak down the middle to the back of the carapace. It is otherwise greyish-brown. The entire carapace is covered in short light hairs, more densely towards the front, and there are large patches of red and reddish-fawn hairs around the eyes. The spider's face, or clypeus, is moderately high and dark. Its sternum, or underside of the cephalothorax, is yellow. The spider's mouthparts, including its labium and maxillae, are generally brown. Its chelicerae are blackish with a single large tooth to the back and two teeth to the front.

The spider's abdomen is a that is the similar length to the carapace but wider, typically 2.2 mm (0.087 in) wide. It is greyish-brown on top with a broad serrated lighter stripe running down the middle and yellow sides that have grey markings. The underside of the abdomen is whitish-yellow. The topside is covered in short brown hairs. The spider has light spinnerets. Its front legs are dark yellow, the remainder being lighter, all having a hint of grey in some segments. There are many leg spines. The spider's pedipalps are also yellow, and have three visible spines.

The spider's copulatory organs are unusual. Its epigyne, the external and most visible of its copulatory organs, is large and has two oval depressions near the front that are partially plugged by a waxy secretion. The edges of the depressions show strong signs of sclerotization, as does the back of the epigyne. There is an oval convex shape towards the wall at the back of the epigyne. There are two copulatory openings that lead to long looping insemination ducts. The spermathecae, or receptacles, are small.

The male has not been identified. However, Wesołowska and Wiśniewski considered that the specimen of Thiratoscirtus tenuis described in 2023 may be the male for the species. The two species share similarities, both in distribution and morphology.

== Distribution and habitat ==
The holotype for Quadrica lamboji was found 122 km (76 mi) south of Makokou, Gabon at an altitude of 500 m (1,600 ft) above sea level in 2011. The species has also been found in Angola and Mozambique. In the second of these countries, it is restricted to Tete Province. The spider was initially found in a sandy area near to a secondary lowland rainforest where it was exposed to very high temperatures. Other examples were found in forested areas near rivers.
