= Pochyta maddisoni =

Scientific classification
- Kingdom: Animalia
- Phylum: Arthropoda
- Subphylum: Chelicerata
- Class: Arachnida
- Order: Araneae
- Infraorder: Araneomorphae
- Family: Salticidae
- Genus: Pochyta
- Species: P. maddisoni

Binomial name
- Pochyta maddisoni Wesołowska & Szűts, 2021

Species of jumping spider

Pochyta maddisoni is a species of jumping spider in the genus Pochyta that lives in Gabon. A small spider, it was first described in 2021 by Wanda Wesołowska and Tamás Szűts. It has an oval cephalothorax that is between 2.1 and 2.9 mm long and an ovoid abdomen, between 2.3 and 2.9 mm long. It has eyes that are surrounded by dark rings, particularly the female. The female is lighter than the male, with the top of the cephalothorax and abdomen being yellow along with its legs. The male has a dark brown carapace and yellowish-grey abdomen. Its front pair of legs are darker than the others and marked with long spines. All the spider's have yellow spinnerets. The spider has distinctive copulatory organs, with the male having a broad spade-like appendage on the palpal tibia called a tibial apophysis and the female a large pocket on its epigyne.

== Taxonomy and etymology ==
Pochyta maddisoni is a species of jumping spider, a member of the family Salticidae, that was first described by the arachnologists Wanda Wesołowska and Tamás Szűts in 2021. It is one of over 500 different species identified by Wesołowska in her career. The species is named for the arachnologist Wayne Maddison.

The spider is allocated to the genus Pochyta, which had been erected by Eugène Simon in 1901. Pochyta is a member of the subtribe Thiratoscirtina in the tribe Aelurillini. Wayne Maddison allocated the tribe to the subclade Simonida in the clade Saltafresia in the clade Salticoida. The species forms a clade with Pochyta equatorialis, Pochyta pulchra and Pochyta spinosa. In 2016, Mellissa Bodner and Maddison proposed a subfamily Thiratoscirtinae for the genus and its related genera. The genus is also a member of a group of genera named Thiratoscirtines by Jerzy Prószyński in 2017. Phylogenetic analysis has shown that the genus is related to the genera Alfenus, Bacelarella, Longarenus and Malloneta. It is likely to have diverged from them between 16.3 and 18.7 million years ago. The genus is distinguished by the spines on its legs.

== Description ==
Pochyta maddisoni is a small spider with a body that is divided into two main parts: an oval cephalothorax and a thinner abdomen. The male has a cephalothorax that has a length of between 2.4 and 2.9 mm (0.09 and 0.11 in) and width of between 1.7 and 2.1 mm (0.07 and 0.08 in). The carapace, the hard upper part of the cephalothorax, is very high with a sharp slope to the rear. It is generally dark brown apart from the fovea, or central depression, which is slightly lighter. There is a scattering of bristles and hairs on it. Some of the spider's eyes have dark rings around them while others are surrounded by white and reddish-orange hairs. The sternum, the underside of the cephalothorax, is light brown. Its mouthparts are brown while its chelicerae are wide with a large fang that has two smaller spikes near its root and two separate teeth both to the front and to the back.

The male spider's abdomen is a narrow ovoid that measures between 2.3 mm (0.09 in) and 2.9 mm in length and between 1.2 and 1.5 mm (0.05 and 0.06 in) in width. The upper side is yellowish-grey, with a lighter patch in the middle and darker areas towards the sides. The underside is grey. The spiders's spinnerets are long and yellow, as are the majority of its legs apart from the first pair, which have brown sections. They also have very long spines that are characteristic of the genus. The pedipalps, sensory organs near the mouth, are hairy and brown.

Pochyta maddisoni has distinctive copulatory organs. The male has a relatively large cymbium that nearly encloses a noticeably smaller palpal bulb. The bulb is bean-shaped and has a long embolus that projects out of the side that points upwards and curls around to into the cymbium. The palpal tibia is long and has a noticeable mound on the side and a very wide protrusion or tibial apophysis. It is the wide shovel-like shape of the tibial apophysis that enables the species to be distinguished from others in the genus.

The female spider is smaller than the male with a cephalothorax that has a length of between 2.1 and 2.2 mm (0.09 in) and width of between 1.6 mm (0.06 in) and 1.7 mm and an abdomen that has a length between 2.4 and 2.5 mm (0.10 in) and a width of between 1.6 and 1.7 mm. It is also lighter. The carapace is light yellow with a fawn eye field. The eyes have similar dark rings, but the rings are more plentiful. There are a few light hairs on the eye field and white hairs around some of the eyes. The mouthparts are yellowish. The upperside of the abdomen is yellow and marked with dark pattern that combines two wiggly lines along the middle and darker patches on the rear. All the legs are yellow. They have brown spines some of which are very long, including one on the palpal tarsus.

The female's copulatory organs are also distinctive. The epigyne, the external part of the copulatory organs, is similar to the related Pochyta equatorialis but has a wide depression towards the rear. At the back of the depression is a pocket that contains two copulatory openings. These lead into insemination ducts that are wide at their opening and narrow towards the spermathecae, or receptacles. It is the presence of the pocket that is particularly useful in identifying the species.

== Distribution and habitat ==
Pochyta spiders generally live in Western equatorial Africa and are particularly common in area around the Gulf of Guinea. Pochyta maddisoni is endemic to Gabon. The holotype was found near Tchimbélé in the Crystal Mountains in 2007 at an altitude of 550 m (1,800 ft) above sea level. Other specimens have been found across the country in areas like Waka National Park. The species lives in forests, particularly being found in areas near rivers and streams.
