= Thiratoscirtus alveolus =

Scientific classification
- Kingdom: Animalia
- Phylum: Arthropoda
- Subphylum: Chelicerata
- Class: Arachnida
- Order: Araneae
- Infraorder: Araneomorphae
- Family: Salticidae
- Genus: Thiratoscirtus
- Species: T. alveolus

Binomial name
- Thiratoscirtus alveolus Wesołowska & Russell-Smith, 2011

Species of spider

Thiratoscirtus alveolus is a species of jumping spider in the genus Thiratoscirtus that lives in Nigeria. The species was first described in 2011 by Wanda Wesołowska and Russell-Smith. The holotype was found on Obudu Plateau, Cross River State at an altitude of 1,900 m (6,200 ft) above sea level. The spider is medium-sized, with a cephalothorax that is typically 2.8 mm long and an abdomen that is 2.8 mm in length. The body of the female is generally brown with a covering of delicate hairs. The mouthparts include powerful chelicerae with teeth that have multiple points and a short fang. It can be distinguished from other spiders in the genus by its copulatory organs, particularly the presence of two long and deep parallel troughs in the epigyne that lead to the gonopores. These are recalled in the name for the species, which can be translated "trough".

== Taxonomy ==
Thiratoscirtus alveolus is a species of jumping spider that was first described by Wanda Wesołowska and Russell-Smith in 2011. They allocated the spider to the genus Thiratoscirtus, first circumscribed in 1909 by Eugène Simon. The position of the species in the genus is tentative. The genus is very diverse and contains many monophyletic groups.

Thiratoscirtus is a member of the subtribe Thiratoscirtina in the tribe Aelurillini. The genus is closely related to Nimbarus. In 2012, Mellissa Bodner and Maddison proposed a subfamlly Thiratoscirtinae for the genus and its related genera. This overlapped with a group of genera named Thiratoscirtines after the genus, created by Jerzy Prószyński in 2017. Phylogenetic analysis has shown that the genus is related to the genera Alfenus, Bacelarella, Longarenus and Malloneta. It is likely to have diverged between 16.3 and 18.7 million years ago. Wayne Maddison allocated the tribe to the subclade Simonida in the clade Saltafresia in the clade Salticoida. The species is named for a Latin word that can be translated "trough".

== Description ==
Thiratoscirtus alveolus is a medium-sized spider with unique physical features. The spider's body is divided into two main parts: the cephalothorax, which is a broad oval, and the abdomen, which is more rounded. Females of this species have a cephalothorax measuring typically 2.8 mm (0.11 in) in length and 2.2 mm (0.09 in) in width. The carapace, the hard upper part of the cephalothorax, is moderately high with a sharp slope to the rear. It is generally brown and covered in delicate short hairs. The spider's eye field is lighter with a few long bristles visible near the eyes themselves. The spider's face, known as the clypeus, is very low and brown. The underside of the cephalothorax, or sternum, is also brown. The mouthparts are distinctive. The chelicerae are powerful, with teeth that have multiple points and a short fang. The labium and maxilae are also brown.

The female's abdomen has a pattern of dense brownish spots forming a mosaic on its top and a plain yellowish underside, although tinted grey, and is covered in delicate hairs similar to the carapace apart from the front edge, which has a dense patch of long brown bristles. It is typically 2.6 mm (0.10 in) in length and 1.9 mm (0.07 in) in width. The spider's spinnerets are light and its legs are light brown, with spines being present on the front pair. The pedipalps, sensory organs near the mouth, have a pronounced spine. It has distinctive copulatory organs, with an epigyne that has v-shaped edge to the very back and a large double pocket in the epigastric furrow. There are two long and deep parallel troughs leading to the gonopores. It is these troughs that most distinguish the species from others in the genus, and are recalled in the species name. The two copulatory openings lead to short insemination ducts and simple accessory glands and spermathecae, or receptacles. The male has not been described.

== Distribution and habitat ==
Thiratoscirtus spiders generally live in Africa and are particularly common in the forests of Central and West Africa. Thiratoscirtus alveolus is endemic to Nigeria. The holotype was found on Obudu Plateau, Cross River State, in 1974 at an altitude of 1,900 m (6,200 ft) above sea level.
