= Thiratoscirtus minimus =

Scientific classification
- Kingdom: Animalia
- Phylum: Arthropoda
- Subphylum: Chelicerata
- Class: Arachnida
- Order: Araneae
- Infraorder: Araneomorphae
- Family: Salticidae
- Genus: Thiratoscirtus
- Species: T. minimus

Binomial name
- Thiratoscirtus minimus Dawidowicz & Wesołowska, 2016

Species of jumping spider

Thiratoscirtus minimus is a species of jumping spider in the genus Thiratoscirtus that lives in Kenya. The species was first described in 2016 by Angelika Dawidowicz and Wanda Wesołowska. It is a medium-sized spider, with a cephalothorax] and an abdomen both typically 1.7 mm in length, although radically different in shape. The spider's carapace is oval and generally brown while its abdomen a narrower greyish-brown ovoid. The area around its eyes is black. It has yellow legs that are marked with grey rings and have multiple spines. The male has pedipalps that are similar to the related Thiratoscirtus gambari but has a smaller palpal tibia, which is recalled in the species name, which means "tiny".

== Taxonomy ==
Thiratoscirtus minimus is a species of jumping spider, a member of the family Salticidae, that was first described by the arachnologists Angelika Dawidowicz and Wanda Wesołowska in 2016. One of over 500 different species identified by Wesołowska in her career, it is named with a Latin word that means "tiny" and relates to the small size of its papal tibia. They allocated the spider to the genus Thiratoscirtus, first circumscribed in 1909 by Eugène Simon. The genus is very diverse and contains many monophyletic groups.

Thiratoscirtus is a member of the subtribe Thiratoscirtina in the tribe Aelurillini. The genus is closely related to Nimbarus. Wayne Maddison allocated the tribe to the subclade Simonida in the clade Saltafresia in the clade Salticoida. In 2016, Mellissa Bodner and Maddison proposed a subfamily Thiratoscirtinae for the genus and its related genera. This overlapped with a group of genera named Thiratoscirtines after the genus, created by Jerzy Prószyński in 2017. Phylogenetic analysis has shown that the genus is related to the genera Alfenus, Bacelarella, Longarenus and Malloneta. It is likely to have diverged between 16.3 and 18.7 million years ago.

== Description ==
Thiratoscirtus minimus is a medium-sized spider. The spider's body is divided into two main parts: a round cephalothorax and a smaller ovoid abdomen. The male has a cephalothorax that measures typically 1.7 mm (0.07 in) in length and 1.4 mm (0.06 in) in width. The carapace, the hard upper part of the cephalothorax, is high with a strong slope to the rear. It is generally brown and covered in colourless hair. It is marked with a light streak and has a furrow-like depression in the middle. A black field surrounds the eyes, with a few short brown bristles visible particularly to the front. The sternum, the underside of the cephalothorax, is brownish. Its clypeus is low with long white hairs. Its mouthparts are generally light brown, with paler tips on the labium and maxillae, while chelicerae are brown with two teeth to the front and a single tooth at the back.

The spider's abdomen is the same length as the carapace but significantly narrower, being typically 1.1 mm (0.04 in) wide. It is a generally greyish-brown with a light serrated streak across the middle, and is covered in light hairs that are denser to the front. The underside is yellowish, as are thee spider's spinnerets. Its legs are genera;;y yellow with grey rings marking off some the segments. The legs have long white and brown hairs and a multiple brown spines.

The pedipalps, sensory organs near the mouth, are light brown and covered in dense light brown hairs. The male copulatory organs include a rounded hairy cymbium that surrounds the smaller irregularly-shaped palpal bulb. A long thin embolus extends from the near the bottom of the bulb and curves around towards th top of the cymbium but finishes in a point before it reaches that point. Its palpal tibia is small and hairy, and has a very small single slightly curved spike, or tibial apophysis. The pedipalp is very similar to the related Thiratoscirtus gambari, but the embolus starts at a different place on the palpal bulb and the tibia is smaller. The female has not been described.

== Distribution ==
Thiratoscirtus spiders generally live in Africa and are particularly common in the forests of Central and West Africa. Thiratoscirtus minimus is endemic to Kenya. It has only been seen in the Kakamega Forest. The holotype was found living at an altitude of 1,500 m (4,900 ft) above sea level.
