= Thiratoscirtus monstrum =

Scientific classification
- Kingdom: Animalia
- Phylum: Arthropoda
- Subphylum: Chelicerata
- Class: Arachnida
- Order: Araneae
- Infraorder: Araneomorphae
- Family: Salticidae
- Genus: Thiratoscirtus
- Species: T. monstrum

Binomial name
- Thiratoscirtus monstrum Wesołowska & Russell-Smith, 2011

Species of spider

Thiratoscirtus monstrum is a species of jumping spider in the genus Thiratoscirtus that lives in Nigeria. The species was first described in 2011 by Wanda Wesołowska and Russell-Smith. Only the female has been described. It is a medium-sized spider, with a wider cephalothorax that is typically between 3.4 and 3.6 mm long and an abdomen that is 2.6 and 3.5 mm in length, both oval in shape. It is generally dark brown and grey on top and yellow and orange underneath, apart from its legs, which are light yellow. It has particularly unusual copulatory organs that enable it to be distinguished from other spiders in the genus, particularly the design of its epigyne, which is recalled in the species name. The epigyne looks like a large triangle and has a triangular depression in its middle. It has a single copulatory opening and gonopore, one insemination duct and small tube-like spermathecae, or receptacles.

== Taxonomy ==
Thiratoscirtus monstrum is a species of jumping spider that was first described by Wanda Wesołowska and Russell-Smith in 2011. They allocated the spider to the genus Thiratoscirtus, first circumscribed in 1909 by Eugène Simon. The genus is very diverse and contains many monophyletic groups.

Thiratoscirtus is a member of the subtribe Thiratoscirtina in the tribe Aelurillini. The genus is closely related to Nimbarus. In 2012, Mellissa Bodner and Maddison proposed a subfamily Thiratoscirtinae for the genus and its related genera. This overlapped with a group of genera named Thiratoscirtines after the genus, created by Jerzy Prószyński in 2017. Phylogenetic analysis has shown that the genus is related to the genera Alfenus, Bacelarella, Longarenus and Malloneta. It is likely to have diverged between 16.3 and 18.7 million years ago. Wayne Maddison allocated the tribe to the subclade Simonida in the clade Saltafresia in the clade Salticoida. The species is named for the structure on the female epigyne.

== Description ==
Thiratoscirtus monstrum is a medium-sized spider with unique physical features. The spider's body is divided into two main parts: the cephalothorax, which is ovoid, and the abdomen, which is a long and thin oval. Females of this species have a cephalothorax measuring between 3.4 and 3.4 mm (0.13 and 0.13 in) in length and typically 2.6 mm (0.10 in) in width. The carapace, the hard upper part of the cephalothorax, is oval and of medium height with a sharp slope to the rear. It is generally brown and covered in brown hairs. The spider's eyes differ in size, with some of them in the front row being larger than those in the back row. The eyes are surrounded in black or dark brown rings and have close by long bristles, and occasionally white hairs. The underside of the cephalothorax, or sternum, is yellow.

The spider's face, known as the clypeus, is light. It has mouthparts that include large yellow to brownish-orange chelicerae, which have a single tooth, and a yellow labium. Its abdomen is an ovoid that measures between 2.6 and 3.5 mm (0.10 and 0.14 in) in length and 2.1 and 2.8 mm (0.08 and 0.11 in) in width. The upperside is greyish with a light streak down the middle and a covering of brown hairs. There are long brown bristles on the front part. The underside is a contrasting yellow with a few grey spots. The spider's spinnerets are yellow and its legs are light yellow, with brown spines on the first pair. The pedipalps, sensory organs near the mouth, have a pronounced spine.

The spider has particularly unusual copulatory organs. The female's epigyne is larger than most other species in the genus and triangular with a triangular depression in the middle. The internal organs are particularly characteristic. The spider has a single copulatory opening and single gonopore, leading down an initially-wide insemination duct to small tube-like spermathecae, or receptacles, that are formed of loops. The accessory glands are small. The male has not been described.

== Distribution ==
Thiratoscirtus spiders generally live in Africa and are particularly common in the forests of Central and West Africa. Thiratoscirtus monstrum is endemic to Nigeria. The female holotype was found near Ibadan, in 1974 in an area of the forest near a river. Other examples have been found nearby, including the Gambari Forest Reserve.
