= Pochyta aurantiaca =

Scientific classification
- Kingdom: Animalia
- Phylum: Arthropoda
- Subphylum: Chelicerata
- Class: Arachnida
- Order: Araneae
- Infraorder: Araneomorphae
- Family: Salticidae
- Genus: Pochyta
- Species: P. aurantiaca

Binomial name
- Pochyta aurantiaca Wesołowska & Szűts, 2021

Species of jumping spider

Pochyta aurantiaca is a species of jumping spider in the genus Pochyta that lives in Gabon. A small spider, it was first described in 2021 by Wanda Wesołowska and Tamás Szűts. It has an oval cephalothorax that is between 1.8 and 2.8 mm long and an ovoid abdomen, between 1.8 and 2.4 mm long. The female is lighter than the male and has a narrower abdomen. The spider has a generally yellow to light brown carapace and a yellowish abdomen, but the female specimens have patterns that can include black, reddish-orange and reddish patches. All the spiders have light yellow spinnerets. The front pair of legs are longer than the others and have brown spines. The spider has unique copulatory organs, with the male having a clump of long dense hairs around its small projection on the palpal tibia, called a tibial apophysis, and the female having sclerotized hoods around the copulatory openings on its epigyne.

== Taxonomy and etymology ==
Pochyta aurantiaca is a species of jumping spider, a member of the family Salticidae, that was first described by the arachnologists Wanda Wesołowska and Tamás Szűts in 2021. It is one of over 500 different species identified by Wesołowska in her career. The species is named for the Latin word for orange.

The spider is allocated to the genus Pochyta, which had been erected by Eugène Simon in 1901. The species holds a basal position within the genus. Pochyta is a member of the subtribe Thiratoscirtina in the tribe Aelurillini. Wayne Maddison allocated the tribe to the subclade Simonida in the clade Saltafresia in the clade Salticoida. In 2016, Mellissa Bodner and Maddison proposed a subfamily Thiratoscirtinae for the genus and its related genera. The genus is also a member of a group of genera named Thiratoscirtines by Jerzy Prószyński in 2017. Phylogenetic analysis has shown that the genus is related to the genera Alfenus, Bacelarella, Longarenus and Malloneta. It is likely to have diverged from them between 16.3 and 18.7 million years ago. The genus is distinguished by the spines on its legs.

== Description ==
Pochyta aurantiaca is a small spider with a body that is divided into two main parts: an oval, almost square, cephalothorax and a more rounded abdomen. The male has a cephalothorax that has a length of between 2 and 2.8 mm (0.08 and 0.11 in) and width of between 1.6 and 2.1 mm (0.06 and 0.08 in). The carapace, the hard upper part of the cephalothorax, is high and generally dark yellow to light brown apart from back, which is darker. It is covered in brown hairs and has a white streak running down it. The spider's eyes have black rings around them while others are surrounded by bright orange and white scales. The sternum, the underside of the cephalothorax, is yellow. Its mouthparts are light brown while there is only one tooth on the chelicerae and a short fang.

The male spider's abdomen is a narrow ovoid that measures between 1.9 and 2.4 mm (0.07 and 0.09 in) in length and between 1.2 and 1.5 mm (0.05 and 0.06 in) in width. The upper side is yellowish with long bristles on the front edge and a pattern of small dark marks on the sides, which are particularly pronounced towards the back of thee spider. The underside is light yellow, as are the spiders's spinnerets and the majority of its legs. The front legs are longer than the other and have nine brown spines on them. All the legs have brown hairs.

Pochyta aurantiaca has unique copulatory organs. The male has hairy pedipalps, sensory organs near the mouth. It has a relatively large cymbium and a flat oval palpal bulb. The palpal bulb finishes at the top with a short curved spike, or functional conductor, which runs alongside the thinner embolus. The palpal tibia has a noticeable wide and flat protrusion or tibial apophysis, which is surrounded by a dense clump of very long hairs. The combination of the shape of the tibial apophysis and the presence of that clump help distinguish the species from others in the genus.

The female spider is slightly smaller than the male with a cephalothorax that has a length of between1.8 mm (0.07 in) and 2 mm width of between 1.4 mm (0.06 in) and 1.6 mm and an abdomen that has a length between 1.8 and 2.2 mm (0.09 in) and a width of between 1.1 mm (0.04 in) and 1.6 mm. Externally, the shape is very different, with a closer similarity between the width of the cephalothorax and abdomen, while the male's abdomen is significantly narrower. The carapace is lighter and has light hairs. Some of the eyes white scales around them. Many the spiders found have a pattern of black and reddish-orange patches on the top of the abdomen. Some specimens have a light brown band running around the abdomen, which is dark brown, with yellow areas to the front and reddish areas to the back. The underside is dark grey with four lines formed of dots running down it. The spider's legs are mainly yellow with some brown parts.

The female's copulatory organs are also distinctive. It has single spine on its pedipalps.The epigyne, the external part of the copulatory organs has a heart-shaped depression towards the rear and signs of sclerotization. There are two copulatory openings that are hidden by semoi-circular sclerotized covers or hoods. These lead via short insemination ducts that are to small spermathecae, or receptacles. It is the presence of the hoods that is particularly useful in identifying the species.

== Distribution ==
Pochyta spiders generally live in Western equatorial Africa and are particularly common in area around the Gulf of Guinea. Pochyta aurantiaca is endemic to Gabon. The holotype was found in Waka National Park in 2007 at an altitude of 400 m (1,300 ft) above sea level. Other specimens have been found in the Crystal Mountains.

=== Bibliography ===
- Bodner, Melissa R.; Maddison, Wayne P. (2016). "The biogeography and age of salticid spider radiations (Araneae: Salticidae)". Molecular Phylogenetics and Evolution. 65 (1): 213–240. doi:10.1016/j.ympev.2012.06.005. PMID 22735169.
- Maddison, Wayne P. (2015). "A phylogenetic classification of jumping spiders (Araneae: Salticidae)". The Journal of Arachnology. 43 (3): 231–292. doi:10.1636/arac-43-03-231-292. S2CID 85680279.
- Prószyński, Jerzy (2017). "Pragmatic classification of the world's Salticidae (Araneae)". Ecologica Montenegrina. 12: 1–133. doi:10.37828/em.2017.12.1.
- Wesołowska, Wanda; Szűts, Tamás (2021). "A revision of the genus Pochyta Simon, with descriptions of new species (Araneae: Salticidae: Thiratoscirtina)". Zootaxa. 5052 (1): 1–41. doi:10.11646/zootaxa.5052.1.1.
- Wiśniewski, Konrad (2020). "Over 40 years with jumping spiders: on the 70th birthday of Wanda Wesołowska". Zootaxa. 4899 (1): 5–14. doi:10.11646/zootaxa.4899.1.3. PMID 33756825. S2CID 232337200.
