= Pochyta minuta =

Scientific classification
- Kingdom: Animalia
- Phylum: Arthropoda
- Subphylum: Chelicerata
- Class: Arachnida
- Order: Araneae
- Infraorder: Araneomorphae
- Family: Salticidae
- Genus: Pochyta
- Species: P. minuta

Binomial name
- Pochyta minuta Wesołowska & Szűts, 2021

Species of jumping spider

Pochyta minuta is a species of jumping spider in the genus Pochyta that lives in Nigeria. It was first described in 2021 by Wanda Wesołowska and Tamás Szűts. A small spider, it has a cephalothorax that is typically 2.3 mm long and an abdomen 2.66 mm long. The cephalothorax is generally yellow apart from its black rings around the spider's eyes and a grey v-shaped marking on the carapace, or hard top shell. The abdomen is greyish-brown on top with a herring-bone pattern to the rear. The spider has long legs long brown spines. The female has a small epigyne, which is recalled in the species name that means "tiny". Internally, the spider's copulatory organs are similar to the related Pochyta pulchra. The male has not been described.

== Taxonomy and etymology ==
Pochyta minuta is a species of jumping spider, a member of the family Salticidae, that was first described by the arachnologists Wanda Wesołowska and Tamás Szűts in 2021. It is one of over 500 different species identified by Wesołowska in her career. The species name is the Latin word for tiny and refers to the size of the female epigyne.

They allocated the spider to the genus Pochyta, which had been erected by Eugène Simon in 1901. Pochyta is a member of the subtribe Thiratoscirtina in the tribe Aelurillini. Wayne Maddison allocated the tribe to the subclade Simonida in the clade Saltafresia in the clade Salticoida. In 2016, Mellissa Bodner and Maddison proposed a subfamily Thiratoscirtinae for the genus and its related genera. The genus is also a member of a group of genera named Thiratoscirtines by Jerzy Prószyński in 2017. Phylogenetic analysis has shown that the genus is related to the genera Alfenus, Bacelarella, Longarenus and Malloneta. The genus is distinguished by the spines on its legs. It is likely to have diverged between 16.3 and 18.7 million years ago.

== Description ==
Pochyta minuta is a small spider with a body that is divided into two main parts: a cephalothorax and an abdomen. The female has a cephalothorax that has a typical length of 2.3 mm (0.09 in) and width of 1.6 mm (0.06 in). The carapace, the hard upper part of the cephalothorax, is high and generally yellowish but marked with a pattern formed of two grey lines that make a V-shape. There are black rings around the spider's eyes, some of which are surrounded by a scattering of white hairs. There are thin dark lines along the sides and the sternum, the underside of the cephalothorax, is light yellow. Its mouthparts are also light yellow.

The spider's abdomen is larger than the cephalothorax, measuring typically 2.6 mm (0.10 in) long and 1.9 mm (0.07 in) wide. The upper side has a mosaic of greyish-brown and a white herring-bone pattern to the rear. The underside is generally light. It is marked with a scattering of small brown hairs on the top. The spiders's spinnerets are light, Its legs are long, thin and whitish-yellow with brownish hairs and spines, particularly the seven pairs of very long spines on the front leg that are characteristic of the genus.

Pochyta minuta has distinctive copulatory organs. The female has a small epigyne, or external copulatory organ, that has a little evidence of sclerotization. There are two copulatoy openings that lead, via short insemination ducts, to bean-shaped receptacles or spermathecae. Although the internal structure of the epigyne is similar to the related Pochyta pulchra, externally the position of the copulatory openings, which are closer together in this species, and the flat epigyne, compared to the shallow depressions that can be found on the other species, help identification. The male has not been described.

== Distribution ==
Pochyta spiders generally live in Western equatorial Africa and are particularly common in area around the Gulf of Guinea. Pochyta minuta is endemic to Nigeria. The holotype was found 30 km (19 mi) north of Calabar in Cross River State in 1980.
