= Lictor perspicuus =

Scientific classification
- Kingdom: Animalia
- Phylum: Arthropoda
- Subphylum: Chelicerata
- Class: Arachnida
- Order: Araneae
- Infraorder: Araneomorphae
- Family: Salticidae
- Genus: Lictor
- Species: L. perspicuus

Binomial name
- Lictor perspicuus (Wiśniewski & Wesołowska, 2013)

Synonyms
- Thiratoscirtus perspicuus Wiśniewski & Wesołowska, 2013

Species of jumping spider

Lictor perspicuus is a species of jumping spider in the genus Lictor that lives in the Democratic Republic of the Congo and Ivory Coast. The species was first described in 2013 by Konrad Wiśniewski and Wanda Wesołowska. Initially allocated to the genus Thiratoscirtus, it was moved to its current status in 2023. The spider is small, with an ovoid cephalothorax that is between 2.4 and 3 mm (0.09 and 0.12 in) long and a longer, thinner abdomen that is between 2.3 and 3.6 mm (0.09 and 0.14 in) long. The spider's carapace, the hard upper part of the cephalothorax, has a clear depression, or fovea, in the middle. The abdomen has a pattern of light and dark patches and light chevrons, although this is less distinct on the female. It can be distinguished from other species in the genus by its unusual copulatory organs, particularly the male's semi-transparent embolus that is recalled in the species' name, which can be translated "transparent".

== Taxonomy and etymology ==
Lictor perspicuus is a species of jumping spider, a member of the family Salticidae, that was first described by the arachnologists Konrad Wiśniewski and Wanda Wesołowska in 2013. It was one of over 500 species identified by Wesołowska during her career, making her one of the most prolific authors in the field. They initially allocated the spider to the genus Thiratoscirtus, first circumscribed in 1909 by Eugène Simon.

The genus Thiratoscirtus is a member of the subtribe Thiratoscirtina in the tribe Aelurillini. Wayne Maddison allocated the tribe to the subclade Simonida in the clade Saltafresia in the clade Salticoida. In 2012, Mellissa Bodner and Maddison proposed a subfamily Thiratoscirtinae for the genus and its related genera. This overlapped with a group of genera named Thiratoscirtines after the genus, created by Jerzy Prószyński in 2017. Phylogenetic analysis has shown that the genus is related to the genera Alfenus, Bacelarella, Longarenus and Malloneta. It is likely to have diverged between 16.3 and 18.7 million years ago.

In 2023, Wesołowska and Konrad Wiśniewski circumscribed a new genus that they termed Lictor after the Roman civil servants that carried a bundle of rods on their shoulders. The rods recall the bristles on the male spider's palpal tibia. The new genus is also a member of the subtribe Thiratoscirtina. Thiratoscirtus perspicuus was one of five species moved to the genus at the time, of which four were from the genus Thiratoscirtus, based on some similarities in the structure of their copulatory organs. The species is named for a Latin word that can be translated "transparent" or "clear" and relates to the male's semi-transparent embolus.

== Description ==
Lictor perspicuus is a small spider with unique physical features, particularly of the copulatory organs. The spider's body is divided into two main parts: the cephalothorax, which is ovoid, and the abdomen, which is a long and thin oval. Males of this species have a cephalothorax measuring between 2.4 and 3 mm (0.09 and 0.12 in) in length and 2 and 2.5 mm (0.08 and 0.10 in) in width. The carapace, the hard upper part of the cephalothorax, is high and shaped between an oval and a rectangle with gentle slope to the rear. It is generally brown to yellow, marked with a maze of black lines and a light yellow band around the middle, and covered in white hairs. There is a clear fovea, or furrow in the middle of the carapace. The spider's eye field is darker with dark rings and white hairs around some of the eyes.It also has white hairs on its sides. The underside of the cephalothorax, or sternum, is yellow. There are white hairs on the spider's clypeus. The chelicerae are large and light brown to dark brown, while the remainder of the mouthparts, including the labium, are brownish.

The male spider's abdomen is an elongated oval that measures between 2.3 and 3.2 mm (0.09 and 0.13 in) in length and 1.5 mm (0.06 in) and 2 mm in width. The upperside is yellowish to dark grey with a pattern that combines a mosaic of light and dark patches in the middle with light chevrons at the rear. The underside is contrasting light with dark patches. Different specimen vary in the intensity of the colours on the abdomen, with some being almost dark brown while others are lighter. The back portion of the spider's spinnerets are darker than the front. The spider's legs are yellowish-brown to brown with a dense covering of leg hairs. The forward pair of legs are longer than the others and have brown spines. The pedipalps, sensory organs near the mouth, are brown with a dense covering of hairs.

The spider has particularly unusual copulatory organs. The male has long hairs on its palpal tibia, as well as a wide sharp spike known as a tibial apophysis that is shaped like an anvil. It has a hairy cymbium that enfolds much of the smaller palpal bulb. The bulb itself is rounded and shaped like a seed, with a cap-like protuberance at the top, out which a short partially-transparent embolus emanates. The existence of the cap combined with the short and semi-transparent nature of the embolus distinguish the species from others in the genus.

The female spider is similar in size to the male with a cephalothorax typically 2.4 long and 2.1 mm (0.08 in) wide. The carapace is similar to the male. Its abdomen is slightly larger than the male, measuring typically 3.6 mm (0.14 in) in length and 2.4 mm in width. The abdomen is lighter and less contrasting than on the male, and the legs are closer in length. The female also has thinner chelicerae and a single spine on the pedipalps that the male lacks. The female spider's epigyne, or external copulatory organ, is rounded with evidence of sclerotization on a protrusion on its back edge. There is a shallow depression in the middle that has two sclerotized pouch-like dips in its front rim. These contain copulatory openings that lead to thin, almost straight ducts that terminate in ovoid spermathecae, or receptacles.

== Distribution and habitat ==
Lictor spiders generally live in Africa and are particularly common in the forests of Central and West Africa. Lictor perspicuus lives in the Democratic Republic of the Congo and Ivory Coast. The male holotype was found on Mount Karisimbi in Democratic Republic of the Congo in 1970. The spider seems restricted to mountainous areas, particularly above an altitude of 3,500 m (11,500 ft) above sea level. It lives in tree-like plants, with some examples found living in Dendrosenecio erici-rosenii while others were seen in wild banana trees.
