= Pochyta konilokho =

Scientific classification
- Kingdom: Animalia
- Phylum: Arthropoda
- Subphylum: Chelicerata
- Class: Arachnida
- Order: Araneae
- Infraorder: Araneomorphae
- Family: Salticidae
- Genus: Pochyta
- Species: P. konilokho

Binomial name
- Pochyta konilokho Wesołowska & Szűts, 2021

Species of jumping spider

Pochyta konilokho is a species of jumping spider in the genus Pochyta that is endemic to Guinea. A small spider, it was first described in 2021 by Wanda Wesołowska and Tamás Szűts. It has a generally yellowish with a cephalothorax that is typically 2.1 mm long and an abdomen that is typically 1,8 mm long. The spider's spinnerets are also yellow as are its pedipalps. Its legs are lighter, a whitish-yellowish, and have brown hairs as well as the spines that are common on the legs of spiders in the genus. The spider is hard to distinguish from others in the genus. The male has distinctive copulatory organs, especially the shape of its tibial apophysis. The female has not been described.

== Taxonomy and etymology ==
Pochyta konilokho is a species of jumping spider, a member of the family Salticidae, that was first described by the arachnologists Wanda Wesołowska and Tamás Szűts in 2021. It is one of over 500 different species identified by Wesołowska in her career. The species is named for where it was first found.

They allocated the spider to the genus Pochyta, which had been erected by Eugène Simon in 1901. Pochyta is a member of the subtribe Thiratoscirtina in the tribe Aelurillini. Wayne Maddison allocated the tribe to the subclade Simonida in the clade Saltafresia in the clade Salticoida. In 2016, Mellissa Bodner and Maddison proposed a subfamily Thiratoscirtinae for the genus and its related genera. The genus is also a member of a group of genera named Thiratoscirtines by Jerzy Prószyński in 2017. Phylogenetic analysis has shown that the genus is related to the genera Alfenus, Bacelarella, Longarenus and Malloneta. It is likely to have diverged from them between 16.3 and 18.7 million years ago. The genus is distinguished by the spines on its legs.

== Description ==
Pochyta konilokho is a small spider with a body that is divided into two main parts: an oval cephalothorax and a thinner abdomen. The male has a cephalothorax that has a typical length of 2.1 mm (0.08 in) and width of 1.7 mm (0.07 in). The carapace, the hard upper part of the cephalothorax, is high with a long rear slope that starts just behind the spider's eye field. The carapace and eye field are generally yellow, but there is a pattern on the carapace consisting of two broad streaks running down the middle to form a V-shape and dark hairs on the slopes of the carapace. There are black rings around the spider's eyes, some of which are larger than others with long dark bristles on them.

The spider has a furrow-like fovea, or central depression, in the middle of the carapace. The sternum, the underside of the cephalothorax, is yellowish. The spider has a low clypeus with long dark bristles protruding forward. Its mouthparts are light brown and its chelicerae have two teeth to the front and one to the back.

The spider's abdomen is an elongated oval that measures typically 1.8 mm (0.07 in) long and 2 mm (0.08 in) wide. The upper side is yellowish like the carapace, although its underside is lighter. There are long dark bristles on the surface, particularly on the sides. The spinnerets are yellowish. Its legs are whitish-yellowish with brown hairs and spines. The front pair of legs are longer than the others and have very long spines that are characteristic of the genus. The pedipalps, sensory organs near the mouth, are yellow.

Pochyta konilokho has distinctive copulatory organs. The male has a relatively large tapering cymbium, which encloses the palpal bulb. The bulb is bean-like in shape with an embolus that projects out from the top of the palpal bulb and a noticeable bent curve in it as it passes over the top of the bulb. The palpal tibia is hairy and has a single short wide tibial apophysis, or curved spike, on the tibia itself. The spider can be distinguished from others in the genus mainly by close examination of the copulatory organs, especially the shape of the .tibial apophysis. The female has not been described.

== Distribution ==
Pochyta spiders generally live in Western equatorial Africa and are particularly common in area around the Gulf of Guinea. Pochyta konilokho is endemic to Guinea. The holotype was found in the Konilokho forest in 2007 at an altitude of 476 m (1,562 ft) above sea level.
