= Thiratoscirtus =

Scientific classification
- Kingdom: Animalia
- Phylum: Arthropoda
- Subphylum: Chelicerata
- Class: Arachnida
- Order: Araneae
- Infraorder: Araneomorphae
- Family: Salticidae
- Subfamily: Salticinae
- Genus: Thiratoscirtus; Simon, 1886

Type species
- T. patagonicus Simon, 1886

Species
- 26, see text

Genus of spiders

Thiratoscirtus is a genus of jumping spiders that was first circumscribed by Eugène Louis Simon in 1886. Thiratoscirtus is very diverse and contains many monophyletic groups. Phylogenetic analysis undertaken by Melissa Bonder and Wayne Maddison has shown that it is related to the genera Alfenus, Bacelarella, Longarenus and Malloneta. The genus is also closely related to Nimbarus. It is likely to have diverged between 16.3 and 18.7 million years ago. In 2012, Bodner and Wayne Maddison proposed a subfamily Thiratoscirtinae for the genus and its related genera. This overlapped with a group of genera named Thiratoscirtines after the genus, created by Jerzy Prószyński in 2017. Thiratoscirtus is a member of the subtribe Thiratoscirtina in the tribe Aelurillini. In 2015, Maddison listed the tribe to the subclade Simonida in the clade Saltafresia in the clade Salticoida.

== Species ==
As of September 2025 it contains thirty-nine species, found only in Africa, Argentina, and Brazil:

- Thiratoscirtus africanus Wiśniewski & Wesolowska, 2024 – Gabon, Uganda
- Thiratoscirtus alveolus Wesolowska & Russell-Smith, 2011 – Nigeria
- Thiratoscirtus atakpa Wesolowska & Edwards, 2012 – Nigeria
- Thiratoscirtus bipaniculus Wesolowska & Russell-Smith, 2011 – Nigeria
- Thiratoscirtus bwindi Wiśniewski & Wesołowska, 2024 – Uganda
- Thiratoscirtus capito Simon, 1903 – West Africa, Equatorial Guinea (Bioko)
- Thiratoscirtus cinctus (Thorell, 1899) – Cameroon
- Thiratoscirtus clarus Haddad, Wiśniewski & Wesołowska, 2024 – Mozambique
- Thiratoscirtus efik Wesolowska & Edwards, 2012 – Nigeria
- Thiratoscirtus elgonensis Dawidowicz & Wesolowska, 2016 – Kenya
- Thiratoscirtus fuscorufescens Strand, 1906 – Cameroon
- Thiratoscirtus gambari Wesolowska & Russell-Smith, 2011 – Nigeria
- Thiratoscirtus gimoii Haddad, Wiśniewski & Wesołowska, 2024 – Mozambique
- Thiratoscirtus harpago Wesolowska & Russell-Smith, 2011 – Nigeria
- Thiratoscirtus lamboji Seiter & Wesolowska, 2015 – Gabon
- Thiratoscirtus iyomii Pett, 2024 – Congo
- Thiratoscirtus kalisia Pett, 2024 – Congo
- Thiratoscirtus khonvoum Pett, 2024 – Congo
- Thiratoscirtus magnus Wiśniewski & Wesołowska, 2024 – Uganda
- Thiratoscirtus mastigophorus Wiśniewski & Wesolowska, 2013 – Congo
- Thiratoscirtus minimus Dawidowicz & Wesolowska, 2016 – Kenya
- Thiratoscirtus mirabilis Wesolowska & Russell-Smith, 2011 – Nigeria
- Thiratoscirtus monstrum Wesolowska & Russell-Smith, 2011 – Nigeria
- Thiratoscirtus niveimanus Simon, 1886 – Brazil
- Thiratoscirtus oberleuthneri Seiter & Wesolowska, 2015 – Gabon
- Thiratoscirtus obesus Wesołowska & Wiśniewski, 2023 – Gabon
- Thiratoscirtus obudu Wesolowska & Russell-Smith, 2011 – Nigeria
- Thiratoscirtus patagonicus Simon, 1886 (type) – Argentina
- Thiratoscirtus perspicuus Wiśniewski & Wesolowska, 2013 – Ivory Coast, Congo
- Thiratoscirtus procerus Wesolowska & Edwards, 2012 – Nigeria
- Thiratoscirtus remyi (Berland & Millot, 1941) – Guinea
- Thiratoscirtus silvestris Wesołowska & Russell-Smith, 2022 – Ivory Coast
- Thiratoscirtus spiniferi Wiśniewski & Wesołowska, 2024 – Uganda
- Thiratoscirtus tenuisi Wesołowska & Wiśniewski, 2023 – Gabon, Uganda, Burundi, Mozambique
- Thiratoscirtus torquatus Simon, 1903 – West Africa
- Thiratoscirtus versicolor Simon, 1902 – Sierra Leone
- Thiratoscirtus vilis Wesolowska & Russell-Smith, 2011 – Nigeria
- Thiratoscirtus yorubanus Wesolowska & Russell-Smith, 2011 – Nigeria

== Bibliography ==
- Bodner, Melissa R.; Maddison, Wayne P. (2012). "The biogeography and age of salticid spider radiations (Araneae: Salticidae)". Molecular Phylogenetics and Evolution. 65 (1): 213–240. Bibcode:2012MolPE..65..213B. doi:10.1016/j.ympev.2012.06.005. PMID 22735169.
- Maddison, Wayne P. (2015). "A phylogenetic classification of jumping spiders (Araneae: Salticidae)". The Journal of Arachnology. 43 (3): 231–292. doi:10.1636/arac-43-03-231-292. S2CID 85680279.
- Pett, Brogan L.; Iyomi, Dieu Merci Mpongo; Mbende, Menard (2024). "Discovery of three new species of Thiratoscirtus (Araneae: Salticidae: Thiratoscirtinae) from Central African rainforest". Zootaxa. 5399 (2): 155–162. doi:10.11646/zootaxa.5399.2.4. PMID 38221167.
- Prószyński, Jerzy (2017). "Pragmatic classification of the World's Salticidae (Araneae)". Ecologica Montenegrina. 12: 1–133. doi:10.37828/em.2017.12.1.
- Simon, Eugène (1886). "Arachnides recueillis en 1882-1883 dans la Patagonie méridionale, de Santa Cruz à Punta Arena, par M. E. Lebrun, attaché comme naturaliste à la Mission du passage de Vénus" [Arachnids collected in 1882-1883 in southern Patagonia, from Santa Cruz to Punta Arena, by M. E. Lebrun, attached as a naturalist to the Mission of the Passage of Venus]. Bulletin de la Société Zoologique de France (in French). 11: 558–577.
- Szűts, Tamás; Maddison, Wayne P. (2021). "New species of the monotypic thiratoscirtine genera Ajaraneola and Nimbarus (Araneae: Salticidae: Aelurillini: Thiratoscirtina)". Zootaxa. 4915 (1): 119–126. doi:10.11646/zootaxa.4915.1.8. PMID 33756588.
