= Thiratoscirtus yorubanus =

Scientific classification
- Kingdom: Animalia
- Phylum: Arthropoda
- Subphylum: Chelicerata
- Class: Arachnida
- Order: Araneae
- Infraorder: Araneomorphae
- Family: Salticidae
- Genus: Thiratoscirtus
- Species: T. yorubanus

Binomial name
- Thiratoscirtus yorubanus Wesołowska & Russell-Smith, 2011

Species of spider

Thiratoscirtus yorubanus is a species of jumping spider in the genus Thiratoscirtus that lives in Nigeria. The species was first described in 2011 by Wanda Wesołowska and Russell-Smith. The holotype was found at an altitude of 1,900 m (6,200 ft) above sea level. on Obudu Plateau, Cross River State. Only the female has been described. It is a medium-sized spider, with a cephalothorax that is typically 3.7 mm long and an abdomen that is 3.5 mm in length, both oval in shape. The mouthparts include large chelicerae and a short fang. Its copulatory organs are unusual, including the presence of a lobe that is shaped like the head of an axe on the palpal bulb and two protrusions on the palpal tibia, or tibial apophyses.

== Taxonomy ==
Thiratoscirtus yorubanus is a species of jumping spider that was first described by Wanda Wesołowska and Russell-Smith in 2011. They allocated the spider to the genus Thiratoscirtus, first circumscribed in 1909 by Eugène Simon. The genus is very diverse and contains many monophyletic groups.

Thiratoscirtus is a member of the subtribe Thiratoscirtina in the tribe Aelurillini. The genus is closely related to Nimbarus. In 2012, Mellissa Bodner and Maddison proposed a subfamily Thiratoscirtinae for the genus and its related genera. This overlapped with a group of genera named Thiratoscirtines after the genus, created by Jerzy Prószyński in 2017. Phylogenetic analysis has shown that the genus is related to the genera Alfenus, Bacelarella, Longarenus and Malloneta. It is likely to have diverged between 16.3 and 18.7 million years ago. Wayne Maddison allocated the tribe to the subclade Simonida in the clade Saltafresia in the clade Salticoida. The species is named after the Yoruba people of Nigeria who live in the area where it was first found.

== Description ==
Thiratoscirtus yorubanus is a medium-sized spider with unique physical features. The spider's body is divided into two main parts: a cephalothorax and an abdomen, both which are ovals of a similar size. Males of this species have a cephalothorax measuring typically 3.7 mm (0.15 in) in length and 2.6 mm (0.10 in) in width. The hard upper part of the cephalothorax, or carapace, is a moderately high oval. It is generally brown with a covering of short brown hairs. It has a pronounced depression in the centre of the carapace, or fovea, that is lighter while the edges are darker and have a coat of light grey hairs. The spider's eye field is black with a metallic tint with whitish-grey hairs forming a thin line around its edges.

The spider's face, known as the clypeus, is brown with a scattering of white hairs. The mouthparts include very large chelicerae, with a short fang that has a wide base and a single tooth, labium and maxillae that are characterised by two wing-shaped blobs. Its abdomen is an oval that is typically 3.5 mm (0.14 in) in length and 2.5 mm (0.10 in) in width. The upper part is dark with a covering of short thin hairs and scattering of long bristles. There is a mosaic of dark patches on its surface and a vague lighter streak down the middle. The lower part is yellowish and marked by a wide dark band. The spider's legs are generally brown with brown hairs and spines. The front two pairs of legs are longer than the others.

The spider has distinctive copulatory organs. The male has light brown pedipalps, sensory organs near the mouth, and a clump of brown hairs in the palpal tibia. The tibia has two protrusions, or tibial apophyses. The first apophysis, nearer the hairs, is shorter and curved. The second is longer and straighter. The palpal bulb is unusual being rounded with a curved top that looks a lot like an inverted comma and a distinctive lobe that is shaped like the head of an axe. A long thin embolus is attached to its top that curves around and then away from the bulb. It resembles the related Thiratoscirtus patagonicus, but differs in the shape of the tibial apophyses and the base of the embolus. The male has not been described.

== Distribution ==
Thiratoscirtus spiders generally live in Africa and are particularly common in the forests of Central and West Africa. Thiratoscirtus yorubanus is endemic to Nigeria. The holotype was found on Obudu Plateau, Cross River State, in 1974 at an altitude of 1,900 m (6,200 ft) above sea level.
