= Thiratoscirtus obudu =

Scientific classification
- Kingdom: Animalia
- Phylum: Arthropoda
- Subphylum: Chelicerata
- Class: Arachnida
- Order: Araneae
- Infraorder: Araneomorphae
- Family: Salticidae
- Genus: Thiratoscirtus
- Species: T. obudu

Binomial name
- Thiratoscirtus obudu Wesołowska & Russell-Smith, 2011

Species of spider

Thiratoscirtus obudu is a species of a jumping spider in the genus Thiratoscirtus that lives in Nigeria. The species was first described in 2011 by Wanda Wesołowska and Russell-Smith. The holotype was found at an altitude of 1,900 m (6,200 ft) above sea level on Obudu Plateau, Cross River State, after which it is named. Only the male has been described. It is a medium-sized spider, with a wider cephalothorax that is between 2.7 and 2.8 mm long and a thinner abdomen that is 2.2 and 2.4 mm in length, both oval in shape. The mouthparts include robust chelicerae and a short fang. It can be distinguished from other spiders in the genus by its copulatory organs. It has a small pedipalp with a rounded palpal bulb and a small spike on its palpal tibia called a tibial apophysis The apophysis is smaller than that found on other species.

== Taxonomy ==
Thiratoscirtus obudu is a species of jumping spider that was first described by Wanda Wesołowska and Russell-Smith in 2011. They allocated the spider to the genus Thiratoscirtus, first circumscribed in 1909 by Eugène Simon. The genus is very diverse and contains many monophyletic groups.

Thiratoscirtus is a member of the subtribe Thiratoscirtina in the tribe Aelurillini. The genus is closely related to Nimbarus. In 2012, Mellissa Bodner and Maddison proposed a subfamily Thiratoscirtinae for the genus and its related genera. This overlapped with a group of genera named Thiratoscirtines after the genus, created by Jerzy Prószyński in 2017. Phylogenetic analysis has shown that the genus is related to the genera Alfenus, Bacelarella, Longarenus and Malloneta. It is likely to have diverged between 16.3 and 18.7 million years ago. Wayne Maddison allocated the tribe to the subclade Simonida in the clade Saltafresia in the clade Salticoida. The species is named for the place where it was first found.

== Description ==
Thiratoscirtus obudu is a medium-sized spider with unique physical features. The spider's body is divided into two main parts: the cephalothorax, which is a broad oval, and the abdomen, which is more elongated and rounded. Males of this species have a cephalothorax measuring between 2.7 and 2.8 mm (0.11 and 0.11 in) in length and 1.8 to 2 mm (0.07 to 0.08 in) in width. The carapace, the hard upper part of the cephalothorax, is high. It is generally brown and covered in thin short colorless hairs. There is a pronounced depression in the centre of the carapace, or fovea, that is covered in whitish hairs. The spider's eye field is short and black with a metallic sheen with a scattering of long bristles near the eyes themselves. The sternum, the underside of the cephalothorax, is a lighter brown.

The spider's face, known as the clypeus, is low and dark. The mouthparts include very robust chelicerae, with a short fang and a single tooth at the front and another at the back. The labium is dark brown and the maxillae have a triangle-shaped lobe at their ends. Its abdomen is between 2.2 and 2.4 mm (0.09 and 0.09 in) in length and 1.6 and 1.8 mm (0.06 and 0.07 in) in width. The upper part is brownish-grey with a covering of delicate hairs. There is a light band visible stretching across the front, along with long white bristles on the front edge itself. The lower part is grey. The spider's spinnerets are yellowish-grey. Its legs are brown, with brown hairs and spines, the front four legs being darker than the rest.

The spider has distinctive copulatory organs. The male has a small pedipalp with a single slightly bent spike on the palpal tibia, or tibial apophysis. The palpal bulb is round with an even smaller embolus. The cymbium is relatively large. The pedipalp is particularly similar to the related Thiratoscirtus mirabilis but the smaller tibial apophysis is a clear difference. The presence of a prolateral protuberance at the base of the embolus is also a distinguishing feature of the species. The female has not been described.

== Distribution ==
Thiratoscirtus spiders generally live in Africa and are particularly common in the forests of Central and West Africa. Thiratoscirtus obudu is endemic to Nigeria. The holotype was found on Obudu Plateau, Cross River State, in 1974 at an altitude of 1,900 m (6,200 ft) above sea level.
