= Thiratoscirtus gambari =

Scientific classification
- Kingdom: Animalia
- Phylum: Arthropoda
- Subphylum: Chelicerata
- Class: Arachnida
- Order: Araneae
- Infraorder: Araneomorphae
- Family: Salticidae
- Genus: Thiratoscirtus
- Species: T. gambari

Binomial name
- Thiratoscirtus gambari Wesołowska & Russell-Smith, 2011

Species of spider

Thiratoscirtus gambari is a species of jumping spider in the genus Thiratoscirtus that lives in the forests of Nigeria. The species was first described in 2011 by Wanda Wesołowska and Russell-Smith. Female examples included at the time were later discovered to have been misidentified and so only a description of the male is available. It is a medium-sized spider, with a wider cephalothorax that is typically between 3.4 and 4.7 mm long and an abdomen that is 3.2 and 4.5 mm in length, both oval in shape. It is generally dark brown and grey on top and brownish-orange underneath, although some examples have a lighter underside to their abdomen, and has yellow to brown legs with brown hairs and spines. Its fang is unusual in having small angular features near its base. The spider also has distinctive copulatory organs that enable it to be distinguished from other members of the genus, particularly the relatively wide club-like tibial apophysis, or protrusion on its palpal tibia, and the wing-like appendages on its cymbium.

== Taxonomy ==
Thiratoscirtus gambari is a species of jumping spider that was first described by Wanda Wesołowska and Russell-Smith in 2011. It was one of over 500 species identified by the Polish arachnologist Wesołowska during her career, making her one of the most prolific in the field. They allocated the spider to the genus Thiratoscirtus, first circumscribed in 1909 by Eugène Simon. The genus is very diverse and contains many monophyletic groups.

Thiratoscirtus is a member of the subtribe Thiratoscirtina in the tribe Aelurillini. The genus is closely related to Nimbarus. In 2012, Mellissa Bodner and Maddison proposed a subfamily Thiratoscirtinae for the genus and its related genera. This overlapped with a group of genera named Thiratoscirtines after the genus, created by Jerzy Prószyński in 2017. Phylogenetic analysis has shown that the genus is related to the genera Alfenus, Bacelarella, Longarenus and Malloneta. It is likely to have diverged between 16.3 and 18.7 million years ago. Wayne Maddison allocated the tribe to the subclade Simonida in the clade Saltafresia in the clade Salticoida. The species is named for the place where it was first found.

== Description ==
Thiratoscirtus gambari is a medium-sized spider with unique physical features. The spider's body is divided into two main parts: the cephalothorax, which is ovoid, and the abdomen, which is a long and thin oval. Males of this species have a cephalothorax measuring between 3.4 and 4.7 mm (0.13 and 0.19 in) in length and 2.4 and 3.5 mm (0.09 and 0.14 in) in width. The carapace, the hard upper part of the cephalothorax, is a moderately high oval. It is generally brown with a covering of brown hairs and white hairs in the centre that cover its depression, or fovea. The spider's eye field is short and dark brown with brown hairs, amongst which are scattered longer bristles. Its eyes are surrounded by long bristles, and occasionally white hairs. The underside of the cephalothorax, or sternum, is brownish-orange with slightly darker sides. The spider's face, known as the clypeus, is very low and light brown.

The spider has robust chelicerae, which have three teeth, the one at the rear being particularly large, and a short stout fang. The fang is unusual in having small angular features near its base. Its other mouthparts include a dark brown labium. The spider's abdomen is an elongated ovoid that measures between 3.2 and 4.4 mm (0.13 and 0.17 in) in length and 1.8 and 2.3 mm (0.07 and 0.09 in) in width. The upperside is brownish-grey with a white streak to the front, a thin band that cuts across it from left to right about two-thirds down its length and indistinct spots towards the rear. There are a scattering of colourless hairs and longer bristles visible on it. In most of the examples found, the underside is a contrasting yellow, with a hint of grey, and four lines formed of light spots. In some, it is darker and closer to the sternum. The spider's spinnerets are brownish with yellow tips and its legs are yellow to brown with brown rings, leg hairs and spines. The forward pair are longer and darker than the rest. The pedipalps, sensory organs near the mouth, are brown and hairy.

The spider has particularly unusual copulatory organs. The male has a relatively wide club-like protrusion on its palpal tibia, or tibial apophysis. It has a narrow cymbium that has small wing-like protuberances near its base and a shape that curves around the palpal bulb. The bulb itself is small with a large lobe and a top that curves into the cymbium. A long thin embolus is attached to its top that curves following the edge of the cymbium. It resembles the related Thiratoscirtus minimus, although the tibial apophysis is larger. Only the male has been identified. Some female examples found near the males had been identified as members of the species, but these have been subsequently been allocated to the species Lictor pavidus.

== Distribution and habitat ==
Thiratoscirtus spiders generally live in Africa and are particularly common in the forests of Central and West Africa. Thiratoscirtus gambari is endemic to Nigeria. The male holotype was found in the Gambari Forest Reserve south of Ibadan, in 1974. Other examples have been found nearby. Some spiders in Ivory Coast had also been identified as members of the species. These are now allocated to Lictor pavidus. The spider thrives in forests. Some examples were found near water, whether streams or rivers. Others live in fallow bush and secondary forest.
