= Thiratoscirtus bipaniculus =

Scientific classification
- Kingdom: Animalia
- Phylum: Arthropoda
- Subphylum: Chelicerata
- Class: Arachnida
- Order: Araneae
- Infraorder: Araneomorphae
- Family: Salticidae
- Genus: Thiratoscirtus
- Species: T. bipaniculus

Binomial name
- Thiratoscirtus bipaniculus Wesołowska & Russell-Smith, 2011

Species of spider

Thiratoscirtus bipaniculus is a species of jumping spider in the genus Thiratoscirtus that lives in Nigeria. The species was first described in 2011 by Wanda Wesołowska and Russell-Smith. The holotype was found on Obudu Plateau, Cross River State at an altitude of 1,900 m (6,200 ft) above sea level. Only the female has been described. It is a medium-sized spider, with a wider cephalothorax that is typically 2.6 mm long and a thinner abdomen that is 2.5 mm in length, both oval in shape. The mouthparts include powerful chelicerae with teeth that have multiple points and a short fang. It can be distinguished from other spiders in the genus by its copulatory organs, particularly the long thin insemination ducts and the presence of slightly sclerotized structures in the middle of the epigyne and two tufts of hair on the edges. The last of those features are recalled in the name for the species.

== Taxonomy ==
Thiratoscirtus bipaniculus is a species of jumping spider that was first described by Wanda Wesołowska and Russell-Smith in 2011. They allocated the spider to the genus Thiratoscirtus, first circumscribed in 1909 by Eugène Simon. The genus is very diverse and contains many monophyletic groups.

Thiratoscirtus is a member of the subtribe Thiratoscirtina in the tribe Aelurillini. The genus is closely related to Nimbarus. In 2012, Mellissa Bodner and Maddison proposed a subfamily Thiratoscirtinae for the genus and its related genera. This overlapped with a group of genera named Thiratoscirtines after the genus, created by Jerzy Prószyński in 2017. Phylogenetic analysis has shown that the genus is related to the genera Alfenus, Bacelarella, Longarenus and Malloneta. It is likely to have diverged between 16.3 and 18.7 million years ago. Wayne Maddison allocated the tribe to the subclade Simonida in the clade Saltafresia in the clade Salticoida. The species is named for the two tufts of hair on the female epigyne.

== Description ==
Thiratoscirtus bipaniculus is a medium-sized spider with unique physical features. The spider's body is divided into two main parts: the cephalothorax, which is ovoid, and the abdomen, which is a long and thin oval. Females of this species have a cephalothorax measuring typically 2.6 mm (0.10 in) in length and 2 mm (0.08 in) in width. The carapace, the hard upper part of the cephalothorax, is high with a sharp slope to the rear. It is generally dark brown and covered in brown hairs. There is a depression in the centre of the carapace, or fovea that is lighter. The spider's eye field has colourless hairs with longer brown bristles near the eyes themselves. The eyes are also surrounded in black rings. The sides of the carapace have bands of white hairs. The underside of the cephalothorax, or sternum, is orange.

The spider's face, known as the clypeus, is very low. The mouthparts include strongly-built dark brown chelicerae, with teeth that have multiple points and a short fang and a light brown labium. Its abdomen is typically 2.5 mm (0.10 in) in length and 1.9 mm (0.07 in) in width. The upper part is dark grey with delicate short hairs and an indistinct pattern combining lines and chevrons. The lower part is yellowish-grey. There are long brown bristles on the front edge. The spider's spinnerets are light grey. Its legs are light brown, with spines being present on the front pair. The pedipalps, sensory organs near the mouth, are brown with a pronounced spine.

The spider has distinctive copulatory organs. Its epigyne is elongated and has a rectangular trough to the front, slightly sclerotized structures in the middle and a v-shaped edge to the very back. The sclerotized structures are characteristic of the species but it also has clumps of very long dense hairs along the sides that are most distinctive for this spider and help distinguish it from others in the genus. The only related spider that shares this characteristic is Thiratoscirtus kalisia, which has an additional T-shaped depression to the back of the epigyne and wide insemination ducts. Thiratoscirtus bipaniculus has two copulatory openings that lead to long thin insemination ducts and sphericalspermathecae, or receptacles. The male has not been described.

== Distribution ==
Thiratoscirtus spiders generally live in Africa and are particularly common in the forests of Central and West Africa. Thiratoscirtus bipaniculus is endemic to Nigeria. The holotype was found on Obudu Plateau, Cross River State, in 1974 at an altitude of 1,900 m (6,200 ft) above sea level.
