= Pochyta equatorialis =

Scientific classification
- Kingdom: Animalia
- Phylum: Arthropoda
- Subphylum: Chelicerata
- Class: Arachnida
- Order: Araneae
- Infraorder: Araneomorphae
- Family: Salticidae
- Genus: Pochyta
- Species: P. equatorialis

Binomial name
- Pochyta equatorialis Wesołowska & Szűts, 2021

Species of jumping spider

Pochyta equatorialis is a species of jumping spider in the genus Pochyta that lives in Gabon and Uganda. A small spider, it has an oval cephalothorax that is between 1.9 and 2.3 mm long and an ovoid abdomen, between 1.9 and 2.4 mm long. The female is lighter than the male and has a smaller carapace. The female also has lighter spinnerets and legs. All the spiders have a darker eye field, which have a scattering bristles. The spider has distinctive copulatory organs, although the female is similar to the related Pochyta maddisoni. The male has a distinctive clump of long hairs on its palpal tibia, a blunt apophysis and an irregularly-shaped palpal bulb. The species was first described in 2021 by Wanda Wesołowska and Tamás Szűts and is named for its equatorial distribution.

== Taxonomy and etymology ==
Pochyta equatorialis is a species of jumping spider, a member of the family Salticidae, that was first described by the arachnologists Wanda Wesołowska and Tamás Szűts in 2021. It is one of over 500 different species identified by Wesołowska in her career. The species is named for the fact that it lives near the equator.

The spider is allocated to the genus Pochyta, which had been erected by Eugène Simon in 1901. The species forms a clade with Pochyta maddisoni, Pochyta pulchra and Pochyta spinosa. Pochyta is a member of the subtribe Thiratoscirtina in the tribe Aelurillini. Wayne Maddison allocated the tribe to the subclade Simonida in the clade Saltafresia in the clade Salticoida. In 2016, Mellissa Bodner and Maddison proposed a subfamily Thiratoscirtinae for the genus and its related genera. The genus is also a member of a group of genera named Thiratoscirtines by Jerzy Prószyński in 2017. Phylogenetic analysis has shown that the genus is related to the genera Alfenus, Bacelarella, Longarenus and Malloneta. It is likely to have diverged from them between 16.3 and 18.7 million years ago. The genus is distinguished by the spines on its legs.

== Description ==
Pochyta equatorialis is a small spider with a body that is divided into two main parts: a round cephalothorax and a thinner abdomen. The male cephalothorax is large and very round with a length of between 2.2 and 2.3 mm (0.09 and 0.09 in) and a width of between 1.7 and 1.8 mm (0.07 and 0.07 in). The spider's carapace, the hard upper part of the cephalothorax, is high, generally dark brown and covered in short colourless hairs. Its eye field is black with a scattering long bristles near the eyes and red hairs around some the larger eyes. It has a distinctive fovea. The sternum, the underside of the cephalothorax, is brown. Its mouthparts are also brown with a single tooth at the front and two at the back of the chelicerae.

The male spider's abdomen is much narrower than its carapace, measuring between 1.9 and 2 mm (0.07 and 0.08 in) in length and between 1.1 and 1.3 mm (0.04 and 0.05 in) in width. The upper side is generally blackish with either a white back third on the top or a narrow line along the back. The underside is black, as are the spiders's spinnerets. In contrast, its legs are much lighter and are a uniform yellow, apart from the front legs, which brown sections. The front legs also have both long and short spines.

Pochyta equatorialis has unique copulatory organs. The male has brown hairy pedipalps, sensory organs near the mouth, which have yellow sections. It has a relatively large cymbium that has long hairs to the front. It partially encases the irregularly-shaped palpal bulb, which is very rounded and has a bulge at the top and another sticking out of the side. There is a long curved spike which runs alongside the embolus from near the bottom of the palpal bulb, around the side and across the top. The embolus itself is long and slender. The palpal tibia is small and has a noticeable wide and blunt protrusion or tibial apophysis, which turns downwards, and has a clump of long hairs. The combination of the shape of the palpal bulb and the hairy tibia helps distinguish the species from others in the genus.

The female spider is slightly smaller than the male with a cephalothorax that has a length of between 1.9 and 2.0 and a width of between 1.4 and 1.5 mm (0.06 and 0.06 in). Externally, the shape is very different, with a closer similarity between the width of the cephalothorax and abdomen. The carapace is generally yellowish-white with a dark brown eye field. There are two indistinct lighter patches and orange bristles on the eye field and black rings around the eyes themselves. The abdomen is whitish on its top with a large rectangular area towards the front and a black stipe towards the rear. The underside is lighter. Its spinnerets are yellowish and its legs are creamy-white.

The female's copulatory organs are also distinctive. It has single spine on its palpal tibia while the epigyne, the external part of the copulatory organs, has a notch on its back edge. There are two copulatory openings which are fringed by curly flanges. These lead via insemination ducts that loop laterally to large thick-walled spermathecae, or receptacles. It is copulatory organs is slightly similar to Pochyta maddison, but it differs in that the other spider's epigyne has a wide deep pocket.

== Distribution ==
Pochyta spiders generally live in Western equatorial Africa and are particularly common in area around the Gulf of Guinea. Pochyta equatorialis lives in Gabon and Uganda. The holotype was found in the Crystal Mountains in Gabon in 2007. Other specimens have been found in the same area at an altitude of 600 m (2,000 ft) above sea level.. The first specimen to be found in Uganda was seen in Budongo Forest in 1985 but was not identified until 2024.
