= Bacelarella dracula =

Scientific classification
- Kingdom: Animalia
- Phylum: Arthropoda
- Subphylum: Chelicerata
- Class: Arachnida
- Order: Araneae
- Infraorder: Araneomorphae
- Family: Salticidae
- Genus: Bacelarella
- Species: B. dracula

Binomial name
- Bacelarella dracula Szűts & Jocqué 2001

Species of jumping spider

Bacelarella dracula is a species of jumping spider in the genus Bacelarella that lives in Ghana, Guinea, Ivory Coast and Nigeria. It was first described in 2001 by Tamás Szűts and Rudy Jocqué based on a holotype found near Appouasso. The spider is medium-sized with a plain dark brown carapace (front part of the spider) that has a length between 2.3 and 3.0 mm (0.091 and 0.118 in) and, behind its carapace, a mottled abdomen that is between 2.3 and 2.8 mm (0.091 and 0.110 in) long. The female is larger than the male. The male has a prominent tooth, which gives the species its name, that recalls the fictional Count Dracula. This feature distinguishes the species from others in the genus, as does its copulatory organs. The male has a distinctive long prong that extends from its palpal bulb, which is situated at the end of its pedipalps, and a long embolus that curves so far that it nearly ends at where it starts. The female can be distinguished by its epigyne, the external visible part of its copulatory organs, and particularly the tight coil at the end of its copulatory openings.

== Taxonomy and etymology ==
Bacelarella dracula is a species of jumping spider, a member of the family Salticidae, that was first described by the arachnologists Tamás Szűts and Rudy Jocqué in 2001. They allocated it to the genus Bacelarella, which itself had been first circumscribed by Lucien Berland and Jacques Millot in 1941. The genus is named in honour of the Portuguese arachnologist Amélia Vaz Duarte Bacelar. The species is named after the character of Count Dracula from the eponymous novel by Bram Stoker. In 2008, the genus was allocated to a clade named the Bacelarella group based on DNA sequencing. This was then refined into part of a subtribe of the tribe Aelurillini, in the clade Saltafresia, named Thiratoscirtina. Jerzy Prószyński allocated the genus to a group of genera called Thiratoscirtines. The holotype is stored in the Royal Museum for Central Africa in Tervuren.

== Description ==
The spider is medium-sized. The male has a plain dark brown carapace, the upper part of its forward section, that is between 2.3 and 3.0 mm (0.091 and 0.118 in) in length and 2.1 and 2.5 mm (0.083 and 0.098 in) in width. Behind its forward section is its abdomen, which is also dark but has pale mottling and a reddish-brown scutum on the top. Underneath, it is dark grey. It is between 2.3 and 2.5 mm (0.091 and 0.098 in) long and 1.5 and 1.8 mm (0.059 and 0.071 in) wide. The part of its face known as its clypeus and its jaws, or chelicerae, are brown, and there are two teeth, one of which is particularly long, from which the species is named. Its remaining mouthparts, including its labium and maxillae, are also brown as is the underside of its carapace, known as its sternum. Its spinnerets are grey and the legs are yellow with dark brown, almost black, sections.

The spider's pedipalps, sensory organs near its mouth, are covered in white hairs which extend beyond its tibia onto the base of its cymbium. Attached to the palpal tibia is a fairly long spike, or tibial apophysis, that curves slightly upward and inward before it ends in a sharp tip. The spider's cymbium is also curved and relatively long. Attached to the cambium is a palpal bulb that has a long dorsal prong and a curved groove which contains the long embolus that curves over so that it nearly points back to itself. There is also another apophysis that sticks out of the palpal bulb. This prong, along with the prominent tooth, distinguish the species from other spiders.

As is typical for the genus, the female is larger than the male. Its carapace is between 2.4 and 2.8 mm (0.094 and 0.110 in) from front to back and between 2.1 and 2.3 mm (0.083 and 0.091 in) from side to side and has a pale brown band towards the thorax, which is a paler brown than the male. Its abdomen has a similar mottling but measures between 2.4 and 2.8 mm (0.094 and 0.110 in) in length and between 1.8 and 2.5 mm (0.071 and 0.098 in) in width. Its spinnerets are pale yellow with a dark streak and the legs are brown. Its pedipalp is yellow.

The epigyne, the external visible part of the female's copulatory organs, has small plate towards the back and no pocket. Its copulatory ducts are short and finish with a tight coil around just in front of thick-walled and wide receptacles, or spermathecae. The coil, which turns entirely around, as well as swellings near the copulatory openings, distinguish the species from others in the genus.

== Distribution and habitat ==
Bacelarella spiders have only been seen in sub-Saharan Africa. Bacelarella dracula has been found across West Africa in Ghana, Guinea, Ivory Coast and Nigeria. The holotype for the species was found near Appouasso in Ivory Coast during 1995. It also lives in other areas of the country, including the forests of the Cavally Region. The spider was identified near Ibadan in Nigeria in 2011, based on a specimen found in 1974.

Bacelarella dracula lives in rainforests. Like many of its genus, the species is adapted to live in areas with low lighting. However, it seems to be more active during the dry season when ambient light levels are typically higher. This is particularly the case for mating, which relies on optical cues and complex movements. It lives sympatrically with related species in Ivory Coast, including the abundant Bacelarella iactans, which is the only species in the genus that is more commonly found in the area.
