= Pochyta =

Scientific classification
- Kingdom: Animalia
- Phylum: Arthropoda
- Subphylum: Chelicerata
- Class: Arachnida
- Order: Araneae
- Infraorder: Araneomorphae
- Family: Salticidae
- Subfamily: Salticinae
- Genus: Pochyta; Simon, 1901

Type species
- P. spinosa Simon, 1901

Species
- 12, see text

Genus of spiders

Pochyta is a genus of African jumping spiders that was first described by Eugène Louis Simon in 1901.

== Species ==
As of October 2021 it contains twelve species, found only in Africa:

- Pochyta aurantiaca Wesołowska & Szűts, 2021 – Gabon
- Pochyta equatorialis Wesołowska & Szűts, 2021 – Gabon
- Pochyta fastibilis Simon, 1903 – Cameroon, Gabon
- Pochyta insulana Simon, 1910 – São Tomé and Príncipe
- Pochyta konilokho Wesołowska & Szűts, 2021 – Guinea
- Pochyta lucida Wesołowska & Szűts, 2021 – Gabon
- Pochyta maddisoni Wesołowska & Szűts, 2021 – Gabon
- Pochyta major Simon, 1902 – Cameroon, Gabon, Angola
- Pochyta minuta Wesołowska & Szűts, 2021 – Nigeria
- Pochyta pulchra (Thorell, 1899) – Cameroon, Gabon
- Pochyta spinosa Simon, 1901 (type) – Guinea, Sierra Leone, Ghana, Nigeria, Cameroon, Gabon, Mozambique, Madagascar
- Pochyta tendicula Wesołowska & Szűts, 2021 – Gabon
