= Pochyta insulana =

Scientific classification
- Kingdom: Animalia
- Phylum: Arthropoda
- Subphylum: Chelicerata
- Class: Arachnida
- Order: Araneae
- Infraorder: Araneomorphae
- Family: Salticidae
- Genus: Pochyta
- Species: P. insulana

Binomial name
- Pochyta insulana Simon, 1910

Species of spider

Pochyta insulana is an endemic jumping spider species of the family Salticidae that lives on the island of Príncipe, São Tomé and Príncipe. It was first named and described in 1910 by Eugène Simon.

Its male holotype measures 5 mm and its female holotype measures from 5.5 to 6 mm.
