= Bacelarella gibbosa =

Scientific classification
- Kingdom: Animalia
- Phylum: Arthropoda
- Subphylum: Chelicerata
- Class: Arachnida
- Order: Araneae
- Infraorder: Araneomorphae
- Family: Salticidae
- Genus: Bacelarella
- Species: B. gibbosa

Binomial name
- Bacelarella gibbosa Wesołowska & Edwards, 2012

Species of jumping spider

Bacelarella gibbosa is a species of jumping spider that is endemic to Nigeria. A member of the genus Bacelarella, the spider has a distinctive shape to the carapace that gives the species its name, which can be translated hunchback. The spider is medium-sized with a cephalothorax, or forward section, that has a length between 3.1 and 3.8 mm (0.12 and 0.15 in) and, behind that, an abdomen that is between 2.6 and 3.4 mm (0.10 and 0.13 in) long. The female is larger than the male. It is also generally lighter in colour, the spider being mainly brown. Its abdomen has a pattern of spots on a wide band on its bottom and, in the case of the female, of two large orange butterfly-shaped patches on its top. The species can be distinguished from others in the genus by its copulatory organs, particularly the male's long thin embolus that is attached to its round small palpal bulb and the large pocket on the female's epigyne. Bacelarella gibbosa was first described in 2012 by Wanda Wesołowska and Glavis Edwards.

== Taxonomy and etymology ==
Bacelarella gibbosa is a species of jumping spider, a member of the family Salticidae, that was first described by the arachnologists Wanda Wesołowska and Glavis Edwards in 2012. It is one of over 500 species identified by Wesołowska during her career. They allocated it to the genus Bacelarella, which itself had been first circumscribed by Lucien Beland and Jacques Millot in 1941. The genus was named in honour of the Portuguese arachnologist Amélia Vaz Duarte Bacelar. Its specific name is the Latin word for humpbacked and relates to the shape of the spider. In 2008, the genus was allocated to a clade named the Bacelarella group based on DNA sequencing. This was then refined into part of a subtribe of the tribe Aelurillini, in the clade Saltafresia, named Thiratoscirtina.

== Description ==
The spider is medium-sized with a body divided into two main parts: a cephalothorax and a smaller oval abdomen. The male has a cephalothorax that is typically 3.1 mm (0.12 in) in length and 2.4 mm (0.094 in) in width. Its carapace, the hard upper part of the cephalothorax, is a dark brown oval, although its fovea is slightly lighter, covered in short grey-white hairs. It has a distinctive high shape with an abruptly sloping part towards its back that is the source of its specific name. Its eye field is trapezoid. The distance between its rear set of eyes is closer together than the front set. The underside of its cephalothorax, or sternum, is dark brown. The part of its face known as its clypeus is also low and dark. Its mouthparts and dark brown and its chelicerae have three teeth, one larger to the back and two smaller ones in front.

The male's abdomen is also dark and hairy, but has two large orange patches that are shaped like butterflies. It is 2.6 mm (0.10 in) long and 1.9 mm (0.075 in) wide. There are grey hairs on the front of its abdomen. Its sides are slightly lighter than its top and its underside has a wide black band that narrows towards the rear, which is itself marked with four lines of light dots. Its forward spinnerets are brownish and its rear yellowish. Its legs are generally dark brown with orange segments. They have brown leg hairs and spines. Its pedipalps are also hairy and brown.

Bacelarella gibbosa has distinctive copulatory organs. It has very long hairs on its palpal tibia, which has a small sharp spike, or tibial apophysis. It ends in a long, hairy and bent cymbium, to which is attached a small round palpal bulb. The palpal bulb is dominated by a long thin embolus that distinguishes it from other species in the genus. Its embolus starts at the bottom of its palpal bulb, circles round and projects from the top winding its way to the top of its cymbium.

As is typical for the genus, the female is larger than the male. Its cephalothorax is between 3.3 and 3.8 mm (0.13 and 0.15 in) from front to back and between 2.5 and 2.9 mm (0.098 and 0.114 in) from side to side. Its carapace is similar in shape but is moderately high and lighter in colour apart from the area around the eyes, which are also marked with translucent hairs and long brown bristles. Its sternum is yellow. It has light brown mouthparts and dark brown chelicerae. Its three teeth are arranged similarly to the male.

The female's oval abdomen measures between 3.2 and 3.4 mm (0.13 and 0.13 in) in length and between 2.2 and 2.6 mm (0.087 and 0.102 in) in width. It is generally brownish-grey on top with a pattern of dark and light small spots over much of its surface, a whitish band crossing near the rear and a white patch at its end. The underside of its abdomen is similar in design to the male. Its spinnerets are all brownish while the legs are yellow. Its epigyne, the external visible part of its copulatory organs, has a pocket at the furrow towards its rear and two large oval depressions. Its copulatory ducts and spermatheca and slightly sclerotized. The larger size of the pocket differentiates the species from related species.

== Distribution and habitat ==
Bacelarella spiders have only been seen in sub-Saharan Africa. Bacelarella gibbosa is endemic to Nigeria. The holotype for the species was found in Cross River State in 1980. It has also been found in other areas in the state, generally in vegetation, both plantations and rainforest. The genus prefers darker areas away from sunlight, except at times of courtship when vision plays an important role.
