= Thiratoscirtus fuscorufescens =

Scientific classification
- Kingdom: Animalia
- Phylum: Arthropoda
- Subphylum: Chelicerata
- Class: Arachnida
- Order: Araneae
- Infraorder: Araneomorphae
- Family: Salticidae
- Genus: Thiratoscirtus
- Species: T. fuscorufescens

Binomial name
- Thiratoscirtus fuscorufescens Strand, 1906

Species of spider

Thiratoscirtus fuscorufescens is a jumping spider species in the genus Thiratoscirtus. It was described by Embrik Strand in 1906. The species can be found in Cameroon.
