= Thiratoscirtus silvestris =

Scientific classification
- Kingdom: Animalia
- Phylum: Arthropoda
- Subphylum: Chelicerata
- Class: Arachnida
- Order: Araneae
- Infraorder: Araneomorphae
- Family: Salticidae
- Genus: Thiratoscirtus
- Species: T. silvestris

Binomial name
- Thiratoscirtus silvestris Wesołowska & Russell-Smith, 2022

Species of jumping spider

Thiratoscirtus silvestris is a species of jumping spider in the genus Thiratoscirtus that lives in Ivory Coast. It was first identified in 2022.
