= Thiratoscirtus africanus =

Scientific classification
- Kingdom: Animalia
- Phylum: Arthropoda
- Subphylum: Chelicerata
- Class: Arachnida
- Order: Araneae
- Infraorder: Araneomorphae
- Family: Salticidae
- Genus: Thiratoscirtus
- Species: T. africanus

Binomial name
- Thiratoscirtus africanus Wiśniewski & Wesołowska, 2024

Species of jumping spider

Thiratoscirtus africanus is a species of jumping spider in the genus Thiratoscirtus that lives in Uganda. It was first described in 2024.
