= Bacelarella iactans =

Scientific classification
- Kingdom: Animalia
- Phylum: Arthropoda
- Subphylum: Chelicerata
- Class: Arachnida
- Order: Araneae
- Infraorder: Araneomorphae
- Family: Salticidae
- Genus: Bacelarella
- Species: B. iactans

Binomial name
- Bacelarella iactans Szűts & Jocqué 2001

Species of spider

Bacelarella iactans is a species of jumping spider in the genus Bacelarella that lives in Guinea and the Ivory Coast. It was first described in 2001 by Tamás Szűts and Rudy Jocqué based on a holotype found near Appouasso and is named after the Latin for showing off, after the iridescent colours of the legs. The spider is medium-sized with a dark brown carapace that has a length between 3.1 and 4.4 mm (0.12 and 0.17 in) and a mottled abdomen that is between 3.2 and 4.8 mm (0.13 and 0.19 in) long. The female is larger than the male. The male has a distinctive pattern of spots on the tegulum, which has two prongs, and a long embolus that curves so far that it loops around itself. The female can be distinguished by its epigyne, particularly the large triangular plate and the long coiled copulatory ducts.

== Taxonomy ==
Bacelarella iactans was first described by Tamás Szűts and Rudy Jocqué in 2001. It was allocated to the genus Bacelarella, which itself had been first raised by Lucien Beland and Jacques Millot in 1941. The genus is named in honour of the Portuguese arachnologist Amélia Vaz Duarte Bacelar. The species is named after the Latin word iactare, which can be translated showing off, and refers to the distinctive copulatory organs and the iridescent colouring visible on the legs. In 2008, the genus was allocated to a clade named the Bacelarella group based on DNA sequencing. This was then refined into a subtribe of the tribe Aelurillini in the clade Saltafresia. However, the differences between Bacelarella iactans and Bacelarella pavida identified by Szűts and Jocqué led to Wayne Maddison, Melissa Bodner and Karen Needham speculating that the genus is polyphyletic and that Bacelarella iactans may not share the same common ancestor to other species in the genus.

== Description ==
The spider is medium-sized. The male has a dark brown carapace that is between 3.1 and 4.2 mm (0.12 and 0.17 in) in length and 2.5 and 3.2 mm (0.098 and 0.126 in) in width. The abdomen is also dark but is patterned with pale mottling and has a reddish-brown scutum. It is between 3.2 and 3.5 mm (0.13 and 0.14 in) long and 23 and 2.8 mm (0.91 and 0.11 in) wide. The clypeus and chelicerae are dark brown, the former having a scattering of light hairs. The spinnerets are dark grey and the legs are yellow. The pedipalps are covered in white hairs and the appendages are pointed. The palpal bulb has a tegulum with a pattern of spots, from which springs a long embolus that curves over so that it circles round over 360 degrees. The tegulum also has two prongs that stick outward. This differentiates the spider from other members of the genus.

As is typical for the genus, the female is larger than the male. The dark brown carapace is between 3.4 and 4.4 mm (0.13 and 0.17 in) from front to back and between 2.9 and 3.4 mm (0.11 and 0.13 in) from side to side and has a pale brown band towards the thorax. The abdomen is similarly mottled, and measures between 3.5 and 4.8 mm (0.14 and 0.19 in) in length and between 2.4 and 2.9 mm (0.094 and 0.114 in) in width. The spinnerets are pale yellow and the legs are brown. The pedipalp is pale yellow. The epigyne has a large plate shaped like a triangle towards the back and no pocket. The copulatory ducts are long and very coiled and the spermatheca is thick-walled.

== Distribution and habitat ==
The holotype for the species was found near Appouasso, Ivory Coast, in 1995. The species lives in the rainforest. It has also been reported in southeastern Guinea. Like many of its genus, the species is adapted to live in areas with low lighting. However, it seems to be more active during the dry season when ambient light levels are typically higher. This is particularly the case for mating, which relies on optical cues and complex movements. It lives sympatrically with other members in the genus, but has been more successful than other, more specialised species. It is the most abundant of its kind of spider to be found in the area.
