= Waka National Park =

National park in Gabon

- IUCN category II (national park)
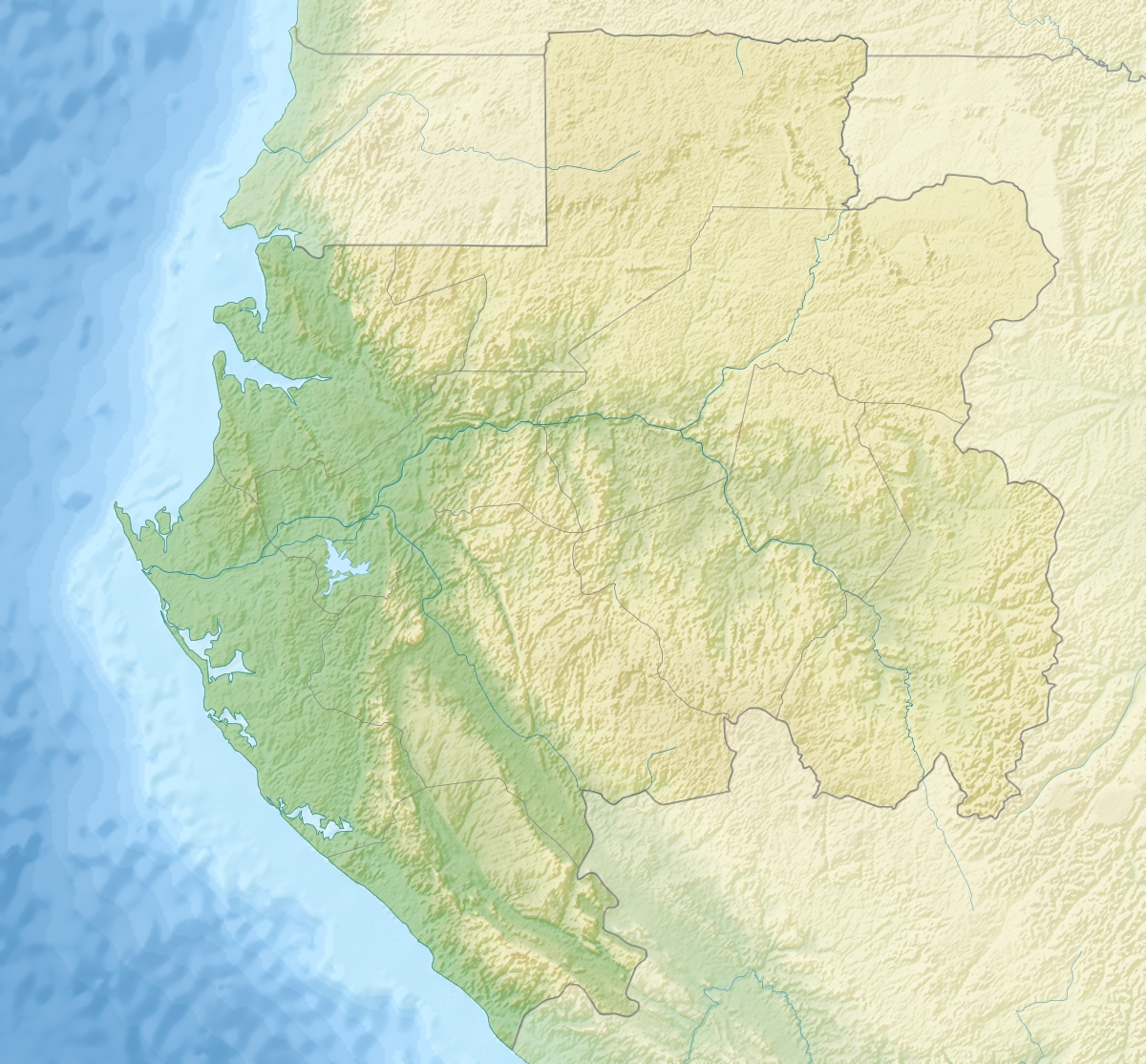
- Location within Gabon
- Location: Gabon
- Coordinates: 1°14′S 11°4′E
- Area: 1,060 km^{2} (410 sq mi)
- Established: 2002
- Governing body: National Agency for National Parks

Waka National Park (French: Parc national de Waka) is a national park in central Gabon. Waka protects over 1,000 km^{2} of rain forest and savanna in the Chaillu Massif, dating as old as 40,000 years.

One of the most striking features of this locality is the Ikobe-Ikoi-Onoi rift, which is deeply incised into the landscape.
