= Nimbarus =

Scientific classification
- Kingdom: Animalia
- Phylum: Arthropoda
- Subphylum: Chelicerata
- Class: Arachnida
- Order: Araneae
- Infraorder: Araneomorphae
- Family: Salticidae
- Genus: Nimbarus; Rollard & Wesolowska, 2002
- Species: N. pratensis

Binomial name
- Nimbarus pratensis Rollard & Wesolowska, 2002

Genus of spiders

Nimbarus is a monotypic genus of Guinean jumping spiders containing the single species, Nimbarus pratensis. It was first described by C. Rollard & Wanda Wesołowska in 2002, and is only found in Guinea. The name is derived from the Nimba Mountains, where the species was first found. The species name is derived from the Latin "pratensis", meaning "meadow", for the habitat where this species can be found.

These spiders are about 4 millimetres (0.16 in) long, though only the male has been described.
