= Alfenus =

Scientific classification
- Kingdom: Animalia
- Phylum: Arthropoda
- Subphylum: Chelicerata
- Class: Arachnida
- Order: Araneae
- Infraorder: Araneomorphae
- Family: Salticidae
- Subfamily: Salticinae
- Genus: Alfenus; Simon, 1902

Type species
- Alfenus calamistratus Simon, 1902

Species
- See text

Diversity
- 2 species

Genus of spiders

Alfenus is a genus of jumping spiders.

The two species were described by Eugène Simon in the early 1900s, based on a single male specimen each. However, the two species are so different that they probably do not belong to the same genus (Szűts & Scharff, 2005).

Alfenus calamistratus has a characteristic hairy appearance.

The males (no females have been observed yet) are 7 millimeters (0.28 in) (A. chrysophaeus) to 9 millimeters (0.35 in) (A. calamistratum) long, with a dark brown carapace. The hairs on A. calamistratum are white or brownish-orange.

== Species ==
- Alfenus calamistratus Simon, 1902 – Congo Basin
- Alfenus chrysophaeus Simon, 1903 – Equatorial Guinea or Cameroon
