= Malloneta =

Scientific classification
- Kingdom: Animalia
- Phylum: Arthropoda
- Subphylum: Chelicerata
- Class: Arachnida
- Order: Araneae
- Infraorder: Araneomorphae
- Family: Salticidae
- Genus: Malloneta; Simon, 1902
- Species: M. guineensis

Binomial name
- Malloneta guineensis Simon, 1902

Genus of spiders

Malloneta is a monotypic genus of West African jumping spiders containing the single species, Malloneta guineensis. It was first described by Eugène Louis Simon in 1902, and is only found in Africa.
