= Bacelarella =

Scientific classification
- Kingdom: Animalia
- Phylum: Arthropoda
- Subphylum: Chelicerata
- Class: Arachnida
- Order: Araneae
- Infraorder: Araneomorphae
- Family: Salticidae
- Subfamily: Salticinae
- Genus: Bacelarella; Berland & Millot, 1941

Type species
- B. fradei Berland & Millot, 1941

Species
- 8, see text

Genus of spiders

Bacelarella is a genus of African jumping spiders that was first described by Lucien Berland & J. Millot in 1941. This genus was named in honour of the Portuguese arachnologist Amélia Bacelar.

== Species ==
As of April 2024 it contains eight species, found only in Africa:

- Bacelarella conjugans Szüts & Jocqué, 2001 – Ivory Coast
- Bacelarella dracula Szüts & Jocqué, 2001 – Ivory Coast, Nigeria
- Bacelarella fradei Berland & Millot, 1941 (type) – West Africa, Congo, Malawi
- Bacelarella gibbosa Wesolowska & Edwards, 2012 – Nigeria
- Bacelarella iactans Szüts & Jocqué, 2001 – Ivory Coast
- Bacelarella machadoi Wesołowska & Wiśniewski, 2023 – Angola
- Bacelarella pavida Szüts & Jocqué, 2001 – Ivory Coast
- Bacelarella tanohi Szüts & Jocqué, 2001 – Ivory Coast
- Bacelarella tentativa Szüts & Jocqué, 2001 – Ivory Coast
