= Subclade =

Subgroup of a haplogroup in genetics

In genetics, a subclade is a subgroup of a haplogroup.

== Naming convention ==
Although human mitochondrial DNA (mtDNA) and Y chromosome DNA (Y-DNA) haplogroups and subclades are named in a similar manner, their names belong to completely separate systems.

=== mtDNA ===
mtDNA haplogroups are defined by the presence of a series of single-nucleotide polymorphism (SNP) markers in the hypervariable regions and the coding region of mitochondrial DNA. They are named with the capital letters A through Z, with further subclades named using numbers and lower case letters. A detailed global reference phylogeny for human mtDNA subclades is provided by Phylotree, which incorporates both coding-region and control-region data, provides universal haplogroup nomenclature, and serves as a central reference for many mtDNA classification tools.

=== Y-DNA ===
Y-DNA haplogroups are defined by the presence of a series of SNP markers on the Y chromosome. Subclades are defined by a terminal SNP, the SNP furthest down in the Y chromosome phylogenetic tree.

=== Human Y-DNA ===
The Y Chromosome Consortium (YCC) developed a system of naming major human Y-DNA haplogroups with the capital letters A through T, with further subclades named using numbers and lower case letters (YCC longhand nomenclature). YCC shorthand nomenclature names Y-DNA haplogroups and their subclades with the first letter of the major Y-DNA haplogroup followed by a dash and the name of the defining terminal SNP. Y-DNA haplogroup nomenclature is changing over time to accommodate the increasing number of SNPs being discovered and tested, and the resulting expansion of the Y chromosome phylogenetic tree. This change in nomenclature has resulted in inconsistent nomenclature being used in different sources. This inconsistency, and increasingly cumbersome longhand nomenclature, has prompted a move towards using the simpler shorthand nomenclature.

== See also ==
- Clade
- Cladistics
- Haplotype
