= Longarenus =

Scientific classification
- Kingdom: Animalia
- Phylum: Arthropoda
- Subphylum: Chelicerata
- Class: Arachnida
- Order: Araneae
- Infraorder: Araneomorphae
- Family: Salticidae
- Genus: Longarenus; Simon, 1903
- Species: L. brachycephalus

Binomial name
- Longarenus brachycephalus Simon, 1903

Genus of spiders

Longarenus is a spider genus of the family Salticidae (jumping spiders). Its only described species, Longarenus brachycephalus, is endemic to Equatorial Guinea.
