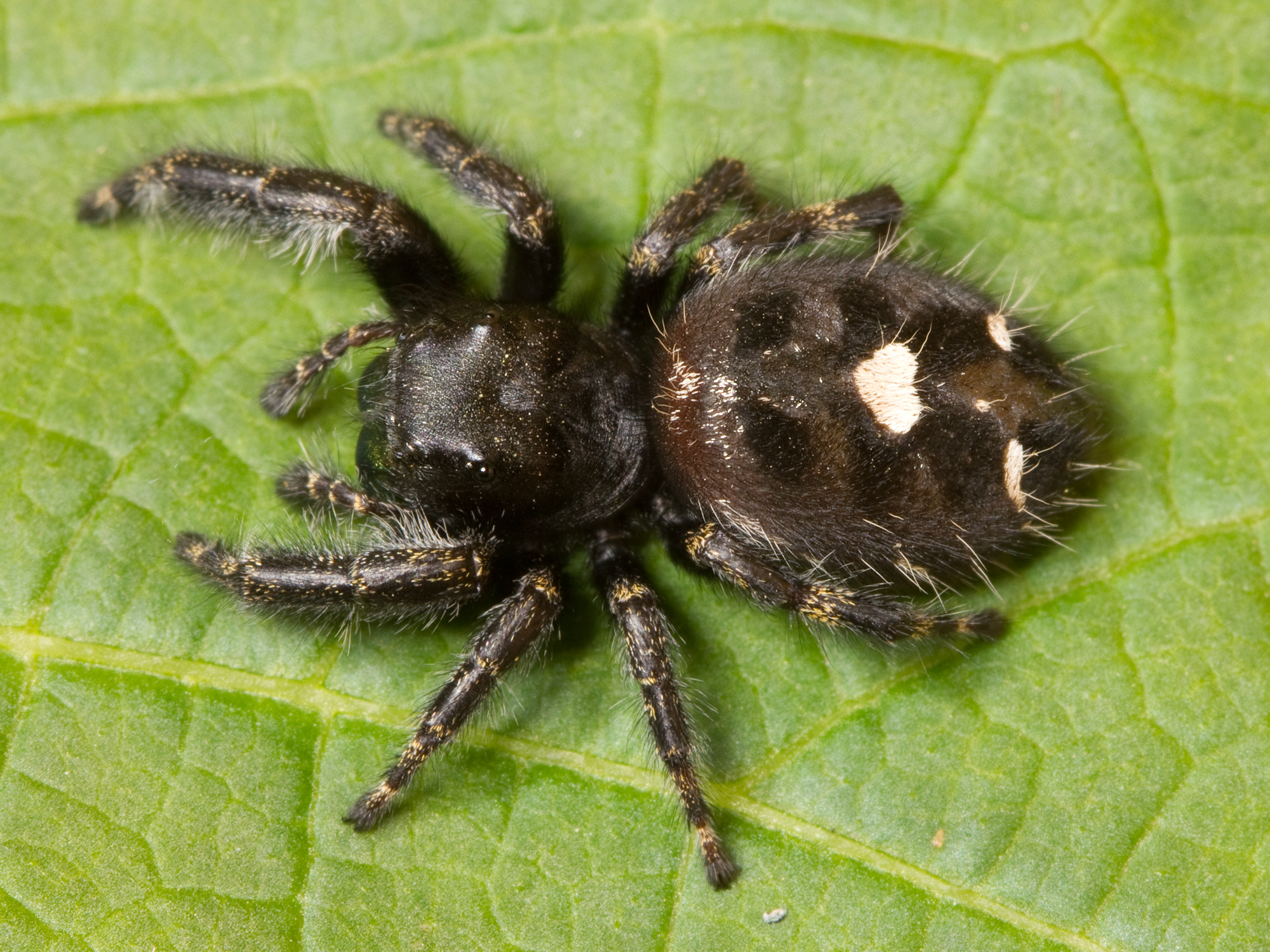
- Adult female showing typical white spots and paired matte black patches on abdomen

Scientific classification
- Kingdom: Animalia
- Phylum: Arthropoda
- Subphylum: Chelicerata
- Class: Arachnida
- Order: Araneae
- Infraorder: Araneomorphae
- Family: Salticidae
- Genus: Phidippus
- Species: P. audax

Binomial name
- Phidippus audax (Hentz, 1845)
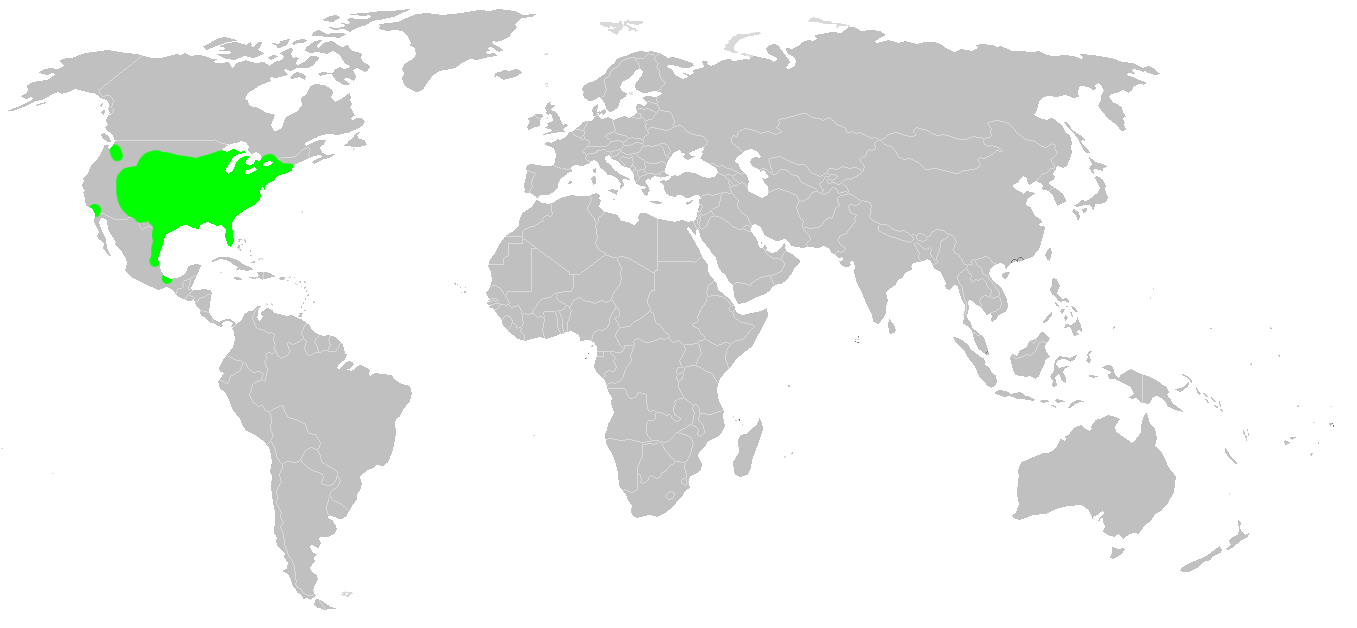

= Phidippus audax =

Species of arachnid (type of jumping spider)

Phidippus audax, the bold jumper or daring jumping spider, is a common species of spider belonging to the genus Phidippus, a group of jumping spiders easily identified by their large eyes and iridescent chelicerae. The bold jumper itself bears white abdominal dorsal spots, one of them prominent. Like all jumping spiders, they have excellent stereoscopic vision that aids them in stalking prey and facilitates visual communication with potential mates during courting. Bold jumping spiders are native to North America and have been introduced to Hawaii, Nicobar Islands, Azores, and the Netherlands.

Bold jumping spiders are solitary carnivores that use their highly specialized eyesight to actively hunt and stalk prey. They prey on a variety of insects and non-insect terrestrial arthropods such as caterpillars, dragonflies, grasshoppers, and other spiders. They are one of the most common spiders found in agricultural areas and have been studied to determine their impact on crop pest populations. Unlike most spiders, bold jumpers do not build webs to catch prey.

These spiders can be found in temperate climates in a variety of terrestrial habitats including grasslands, chaparrals, open woodlands, and agricultural fields. The bold jumper is one of the most commonly occurring spider species within its range and is often found living in close proximity to humans. Bites from Phidippus audax are rare but may occur if they feel threatened or are mishandled.

== Naming ==
Phidippus audax are commonly referred to as "bold jumping spiders" or "bold jumpers". The species name, audax, is a Latin adjective meaning "audacious" or "bold". This name was first used to describe the species by French arachnologist Nicholas Marcellus Hentz, who described the spider as being, "very bold, often jumping on the hand which threatens it". Bold jumpers belongs to the jumping spider family, Salticidae, which is derived from the Latin word "saltare" meaning "to jump".

== History ==
The bold jumping spider is believed to have first been described in 1833 by French entomologist, Pierre-Hippolyte Lucas, who named the spider Salticus variegatus. In 1845, Nicholas Marcellus Hentz published his work describing a species he called Attus audax. These types were believed to be the same species, but due to the loss of specimens there was much confusion about their identities. In 1846, Carl Ludwig Koch created the genus Phidippus in which Phidippus variegatus (Lucas) and Phidippus audax (Hentz) were considered separate species, with southern specimens regarded as Phidippus variegatus and northern specimens regarded as Phidippus audax. However, the use of Phidippus audax was favored and further research concluded that they were the same species. The name Salticus variegatus has since been declared "nomen oblitum".

== Taxonomy ==
The bold jumper is a member of the genus Phidippus and belongs to the Salticidae family. This family is distinguished by their highly evolved stereoscopic vision and unique hunting behavior. In 2004, Glavis Bernard Edwards, a taxonomic entomologist specializing in spiders, published a study in which he analyzed specimens of the genus Phidippus and hypothesized their taxonomic placement. Phidippus audax was placed in a clade with Phidippus princeps, Phidippus pulcherrimus, Phidippus bidentatus, Phidippus felinus, and Phidippus workmani. These species were distinguished by the presence of partial vertical ridges in the central distal part of the palea. Phidippus bidentatus was hypothesized to be the closest relative of Phidippus audax because they share the synapomorphy of having the male endite concave laterally.

== Description ==
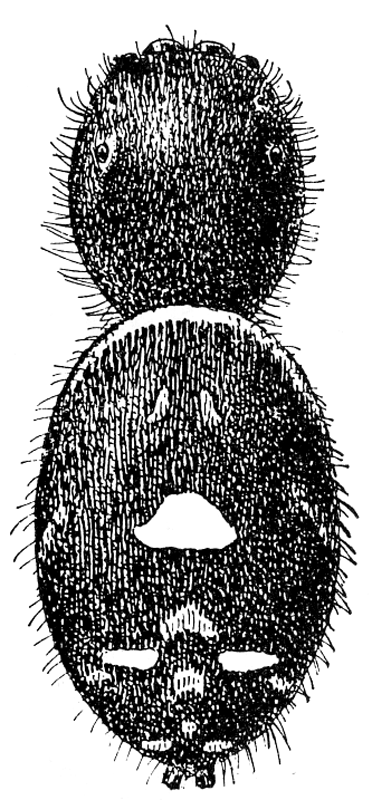
Illustration by James Henry Emerton (1902)

The adult female bold jumper ranges from 8–15 mm (0.31–0.59 in) in body length. Adult males are smaller and range from 6–13 mm (0.24–0.51 in) in body length. Several aspects are helpful to identify them (after Edwards, 2004) The presence of a large (typically triangular) white spot in the center of the abdomen with two smaller spots below it is often used to distinguish this species. Phidippus regius has a similar abdominal pattern and overlaps with P. audax in the southeastern United States. However, the posterior light spots are usually more linear in P. audax and more oval in P. regius. Also, P. audax has pairs of matte black patches on the abdomen, while P. regius does not. Bold jumpers are often recognized by their powerful legs that they use to jump. The legs and pedipalp have white banding with fringes that are more prominent in males. In females, the fourth pair of legs are typically the longest while in males the first pair of legs are the longest. The chelicerae are iridescent green. The adult males' chelicerae and markings are much more striking than the females', and they have tufts of hair over their eyes. In spiderlings, markings are usually orange and turn white as the spider matures. Bold jumpers may also vary significantly in size and coloration amongst different populations.

=== Vision ===
Like all jumping spiders, bold jumpers have exceptional eyesight. Their unique visual system is widely regarded as the best amongst all spiders and plays an important role in courtship, hunting, and observational learning. Similar to other spiders, bold jumpers have four pairs of eyes arranged in a semi-circle around their head, giving them nearly 360° of visual coverage. Vision in courtship is important as the females choose a mate by watching the males perform leg movements and body movements. The forward-facing eyes are the largest and are known as the principal eyes or the anterior median (AM) eyes. The retina of these eyes are able to rotate, allowing them to follow a moving target. These eyes have the greatest resolution and are able to see color. They are also key to estimating distances and a critical component of successful hunting. The remaining three pairs of eyes are known as the secondary eyes. The first pair of secondary eyes are the anterior lateral (AL) eyes. They are responsible for detecting approaching, moving, or "looming" objects. Next is the posterior median (PM) eyes and the posterior lateral (PL) eyes. These eyes help detect motion from the sides and behind. All pairs of the secondary eyes are used in motion detection, feeding directly into successful hunting and predator avoidance. Using their sophisticated vision, bold jumpers have been known to modify their own behaviors after observing others. These levels of visual processing and behavioral flexibility are uncommon in spiders.

=== Behavior ===
Bold jumpers will quickly flee from animals that are too large to eat, jumping down and away or hiding in small crevices. At night they hide in a crevice or small cavity and make a silk retreat to avoid predators that hunt by touch. Bold jumpers are shy spiders that retreat from humans when approached. If handled, they generally do not bite. These characteristics make them appear to have a great deal of curiosity and personality. Like most jumping spiders, bold jumpers hunt alone during the day.

=== Feeding ===
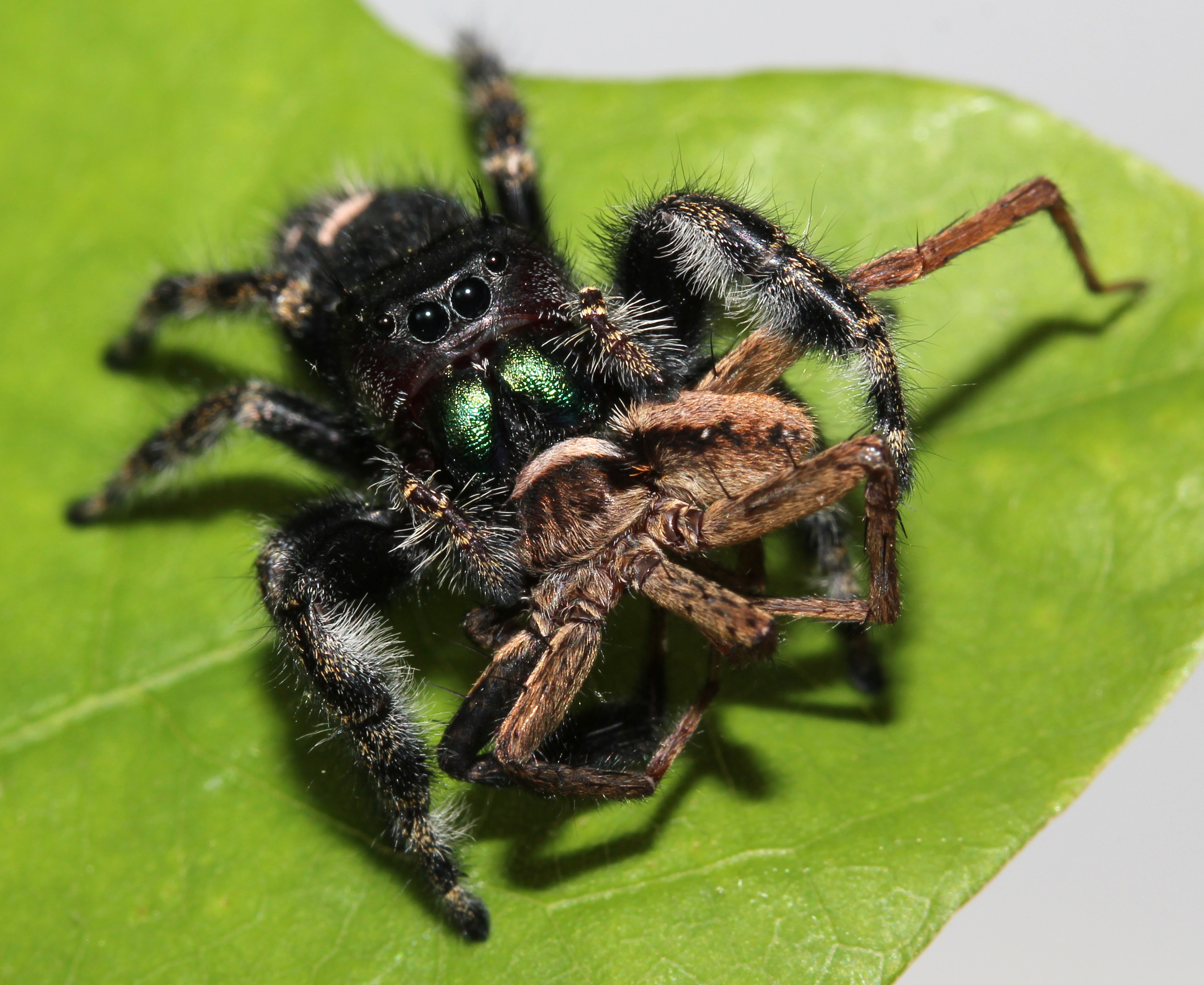
Feeding Phidippus audax

Bold jumping spider (Phidippus audax) with a cutworm (tribe Noctuini) lost to ants (genus Crematogaster)

Bold jumpers are solitary carnivores. Although scavenging has been reported in this species, it most commonly preys on live quarry. In the lab, spiders that exclusively scavenge were shown to have lower survival rates than those that exclusively hunted live prey items. They rely on their highly specialized eyesight to actively hunt and capture live prey. Because they rely on their eyesight, they are diurnal. They are often found hunting on fence posts and plants' leaves, stems, and branches. Bold jumpers prey on a variety of insects such as caterpillars, dragonflies, grasshoppers, and other non-insect terrestrial arthropods such as spiders. As one of the most common spiders found in agricultural areas, they consume many crop pests including bollworms, boll weevils, spotted cucumber beetles, sorghum midges, fall webworms, cotton leaf worms, cotton fleahopper, tarnished plant bugs, stink bugs, lotus bugs, three-cornered alfalfa hoppers, and leafhoppers. For many of these species, bold jumpers feed on both the larval and adult forms. The size of the prey is correlated with the size of the spider. Spiderlings feed on smaller prey than adults. Feeding habits also differ by sex. Females tend to spend more time feeding and consume more and larger prey than males.

When Phidippus audax finds its prey, it first orients itself so its anterior median (AM) eyes are facing the prey. It then stalks its prey, slowly approaching until it is within jumping distance. Once close enough, it crouches and releases a silk dragline that will tether the spider if it falls or misses its target. Next, it pounces with its legs raised. It grasps onto its prey with its forelegs while sinking its fangs into the prey, immobilizing it with its venom. Bold jumpers are able to distinguish between different types of prey and adjust their attack accordingly. They have been observed attacking loopers from the front and biting their head in order to avoid being stricken by them. Contrasting this, when attacking flies, they avoid attacking from the front in order to avoid alarming the fly and causing it to fly away. Although bold jumpers don't build webs of their own, they have been observed invading the webs of other spiders to steal freshly caught insects or attack the spiders themselves. Bold jumpers have extra-oral digestion and use their fangs to suck the liquid out of their prey.

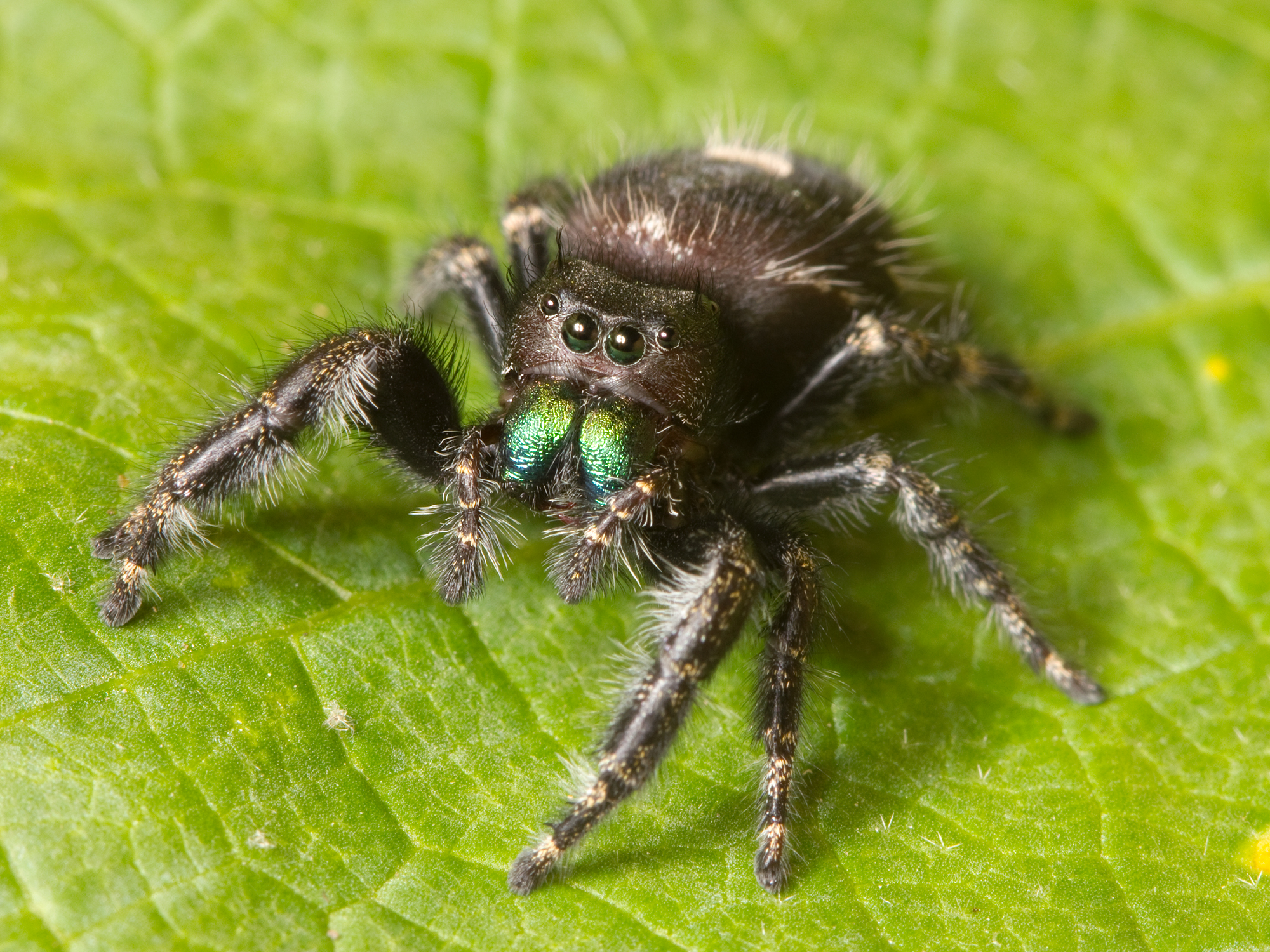
Adult Phidippus audax

=== Life cycle ===
About 10 days after oviposition, spiderlings hatch within the egg-sac. After hatching, they complete their first molt within the egg-sac and do not emerge for another 10–14 days. They emerge as second instars that are free-living and capable of hunting. After emerging, spiderlings often disperse through ballooning. Bold jumpers continue to mature through 6-7 more instars. Every instar, with the exception of the first, completes its molt within a molting web. They enclose themselves in this web to shed their exoskeleton. After each molt, they emerge larger. Females usually require one more instar than males and reach maturity a few weeks later. This is likely because they are larger and need more time to develop. On average, bold jumpers take about 9 months from oviposition to reach sexual maturity.

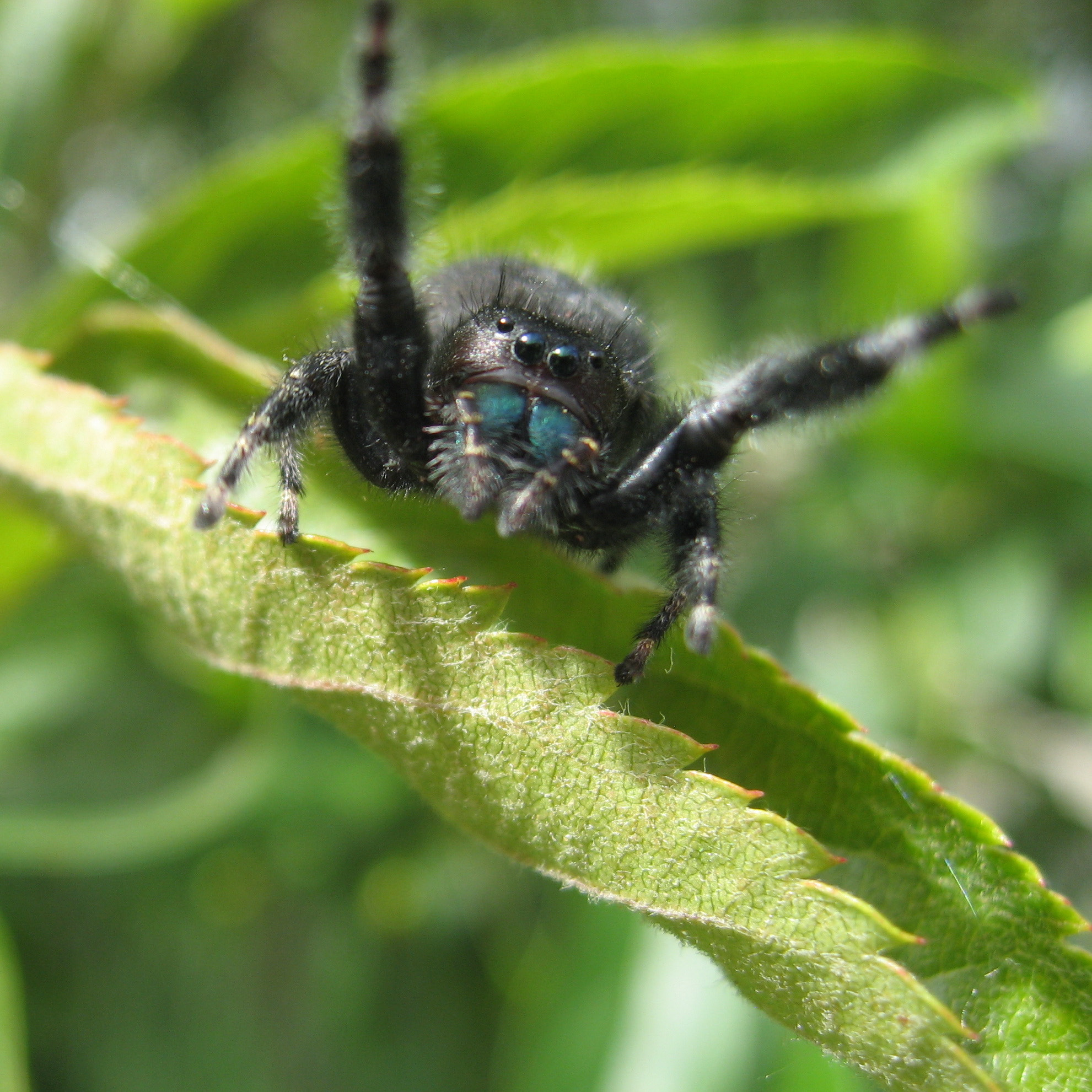
Bold jumping spider.

In the northern part of its range, bold jumpers overwinter as immatures. In preparation, these spiders envelop themselves in sac-like silk shelters hidden underneath rocks and bark. These shelters help conceal and protect the spider. As temperatures drop, spiders enter a state of dormancy called diapause, during which development is halted. Spiders emerge in the spring and complete their final molts. They are typically ready to mate by late spring or early summer. In a laboratory study, the lifespan of bold jumpers was a little over a year with females living a couple months longer than males.

=== Reproduction ===
After completing their final molts, bold jumpers are fully developed and ready to mate. A male prepares for mating by constructing a small silk mat upon which he releases his sperm from his testes and then draws it into each of his two emboli. The male then begins to search for a female. Females emit pheromones in their draglines that males can detect through contact with chemoreceptors in their pedipalps. This provides the male with information about the females reproductive status and aids in his search.

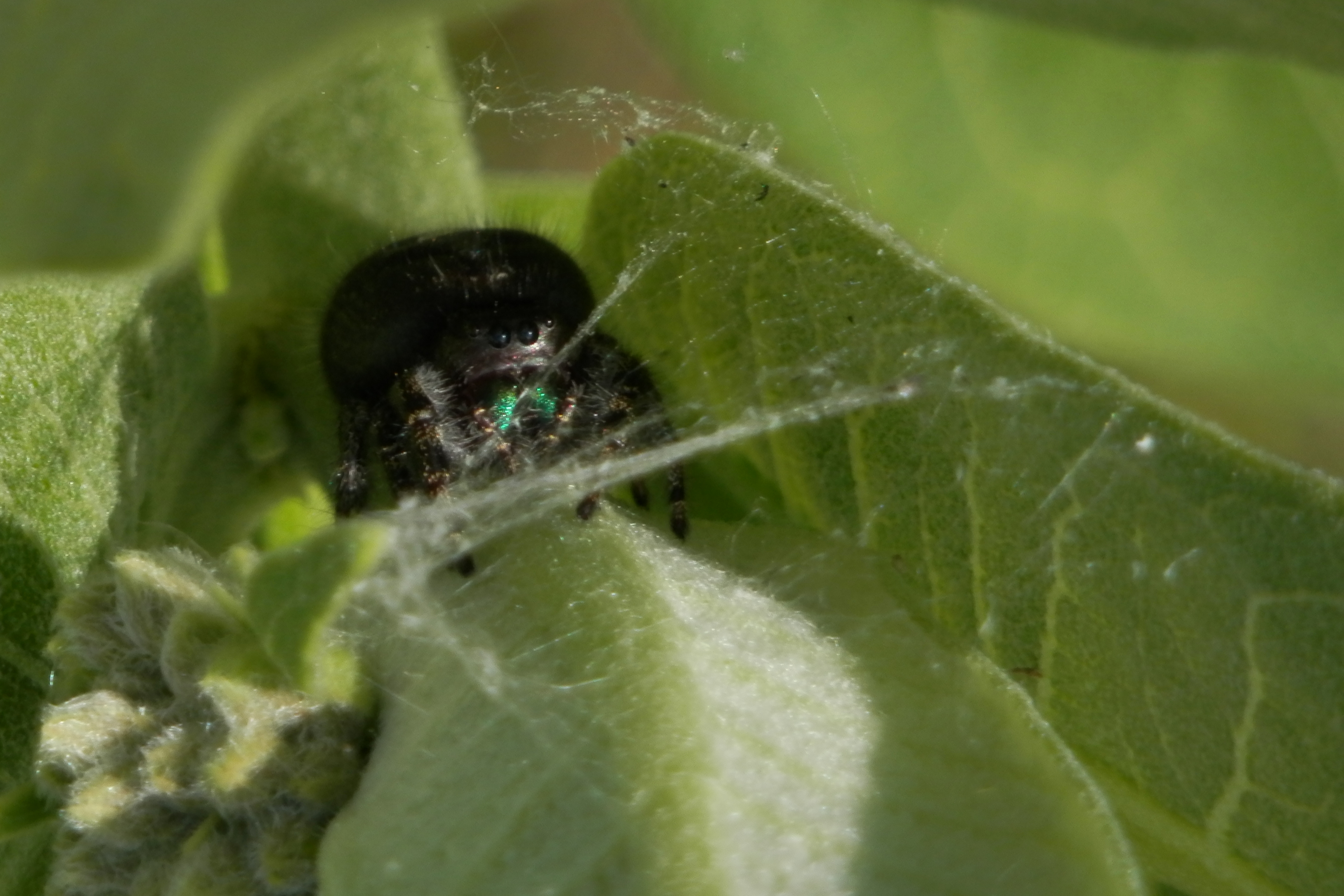
Bold jumping spider in Ontario, Canada.

As males mature in advance of females, the males often encounter an immature female's nest when searching for a potential mate. In an attempt to increase mating chance, the male may build a nest nearby, then wait until that female matures for an opportunity to mate. Upon encountering a sexually mature female, he begins a courtship display. In this display, he raises his front legs, then flicks his forelegs, and shakes his pedipalps while moving laterally in a zigzag path. The male also occasionally pauses in a pose with his legs still raised. The male continues his dance while slowly approaching the female. The female often raises her front legs defensively, sometimes attacking or killing the male. If she receives him, she will lower her legs and remain still, allowing him to mount her back. Facing her posterior, he then uses his legs to repeatedly rotate her in order to insert his emboli into her two epigynum, releasing his sperm. The average copulation event takes about one hour and 18 minutes but ranges anywhere from 14 minutes to two hours and 48 minutes for both northern and southern forms. Males will continue to mate with multiple females but females typically only mate once per reproductive event, from which she can lay up to 6 clutches of eggs before needing to mate again. Reproductive periods are typically in late spring and early summer with the majority of eggs being laid in June and July. In warmer regions, reproduction is extended or continuous.

After mating, a female bold jumper prepares a nest to deposit her eggs. She builds these nest in hidden areas, usually under rocks, bark, and leaves. She starts by first weaving a thin sheet of silk. In the center of this sheet, she begins constructing the egg-sac by weaving a dense bed. Next, she deposits her eggs in the center, containing anywhere from 30-170 eggs over a period of 1.5–3 hours. After she finishes laying, she covers them creating a disk shaped egg-sac. She then weaves a cave like webbing over the sac where she will remain during incubation guarding the eggs and adding more silk periodically. She does not eat during this time period and will not leave the nest until the second instars emerge from the egg-sac a month later.

== Distribution and habitat ==
Bold jumping spiders are native to North America. They are widespread throughout the United States, southern Canada, and northern Mexico. It is believed they were introduced to the arid regions of the southwest United States, surviving in areas where irrigation is practiced. They were also introduced to Hawaii, Nicobar Islands, Azores, and the Netherlands.

Bold jumpers prefer temperate climates and can be found in a variety of terrestrial habitats including grasslands, chaparrals, open woodlands, and agricultural fields The bold jumper is one of the most commonly occurring spider species within its range and can be found living in close proximity to humans. They are frequently seen in gardens, and inside homes, barns, and garages. Jumping spiders require daylight to see and are thus more likely to be observed during the day. At night, bold jumpers can be found sheltering in sac-like silk retreats near their hunting grounds. They spin these retreats in concealed areas, frequently on vegetation and under stones and bark. These retreats help protect the spider and are often used repeatedly. Similar retreats are utilized in overwintering individuals. Bold jumpers are one of the most abundant spiders in agricultural crops and hunt many crop pests. In parts of its southern range, they can be found in grassy areas near water.

== Predators ==
Species of spider wasps and thread-waisted wasps have been observed feeding bold jumpers to their young. Additionally, lizards, dragonflies, birds, and other spider species are known predators of the bold jumping spider. At night, they hide from predators in silk retreats. During the day, they will hide from predators by hiding in crevices. Their secondary eyes are specialized in detecting "looming" objects and provide them a near 360° view, allowing them to quickly detect an approaching predator.

== Bites to humans ==
Bites from bold jumping spiders are rare but may occur if they feel threatened or are mishandled. Bites are often described as mildly painful and are not considered dangerous. Medical attention is only advised if symptoms worsen or abnormal symptoms arise. Symptoms often include localized redness, itching, and swelling for one to two days or no symptoms at all. It is recommended that if bitten, victims wash the area with water and a mild soap. A cold compress may be used to treat swelling and aspirin and acetaminophen may be used for pain management.

== Cultural significance ==
On June 11, 2021, New Hampshire Governor Chris Sununu signed the HB 318 bill designating Phidippus audax as the state spider. The designation came after a campaign by a class in Hollis, New Hampshire. Bold jumpers are currently very abundant and one of the most common spiders in the United States. As a major predator of crop pests, they have been studied to determine their impact on pest insect populations. In addition to eating pests, they also eat beneficial insects such as pollinators.

== Gallery ==
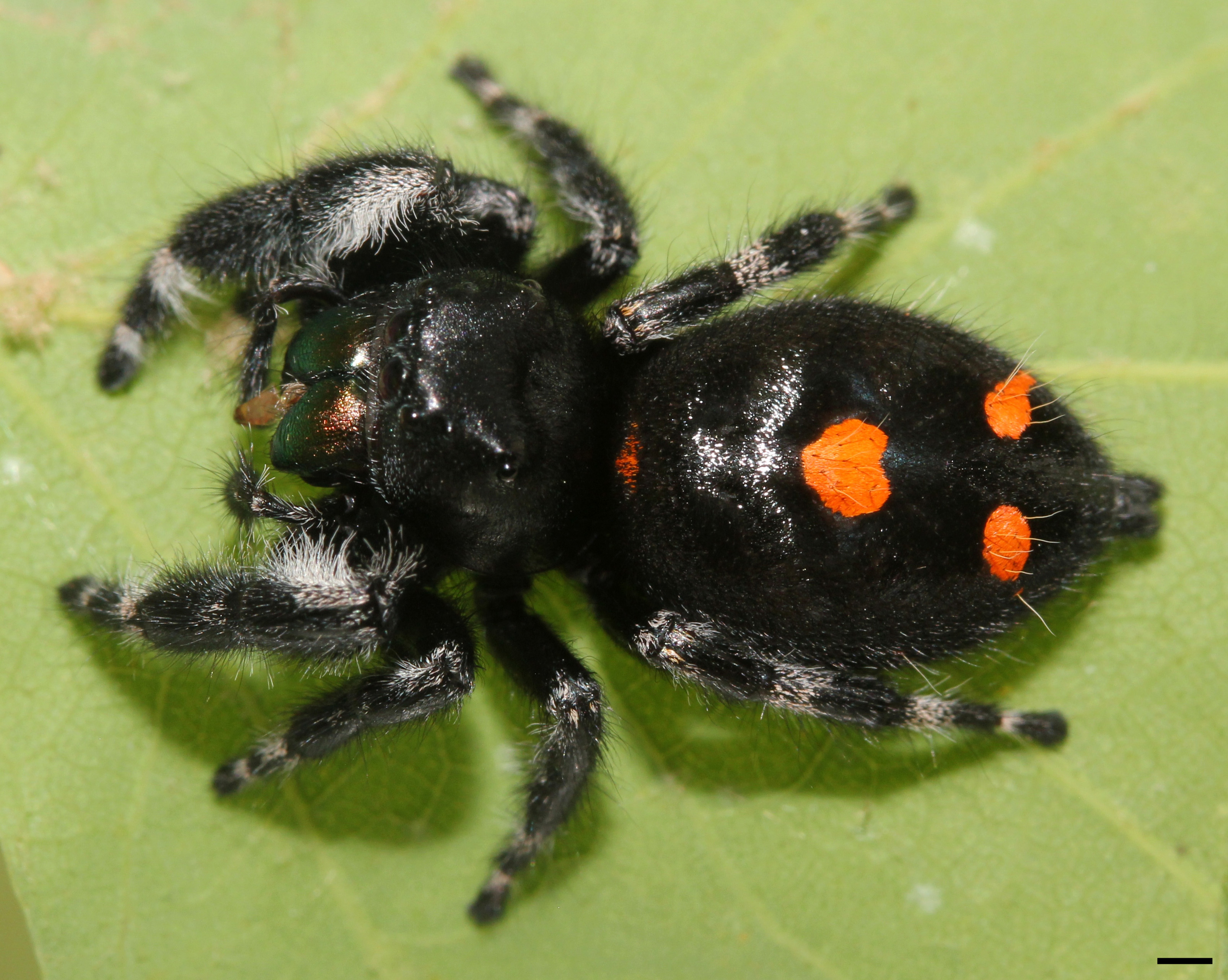
Female in Florida

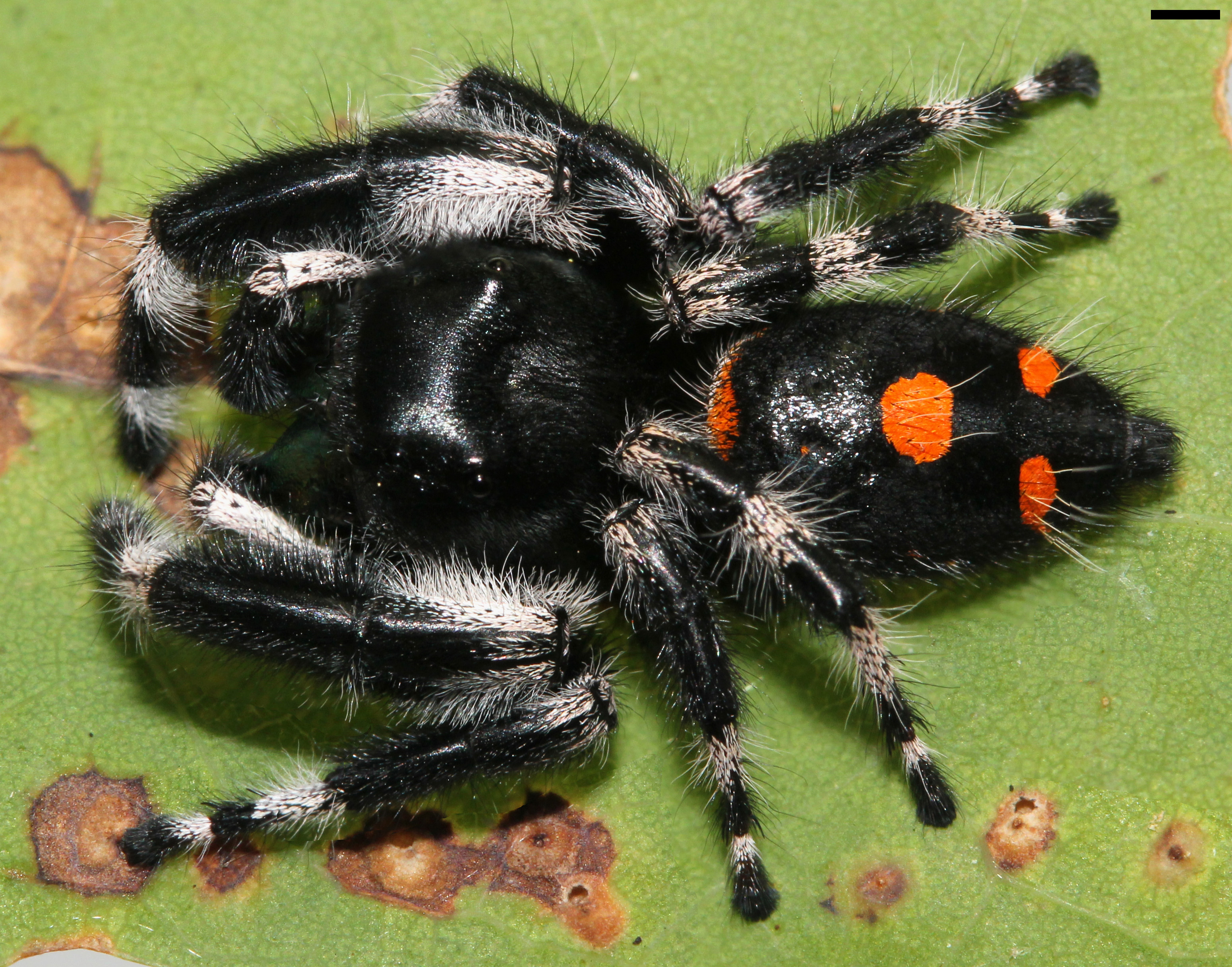
Male in Florida

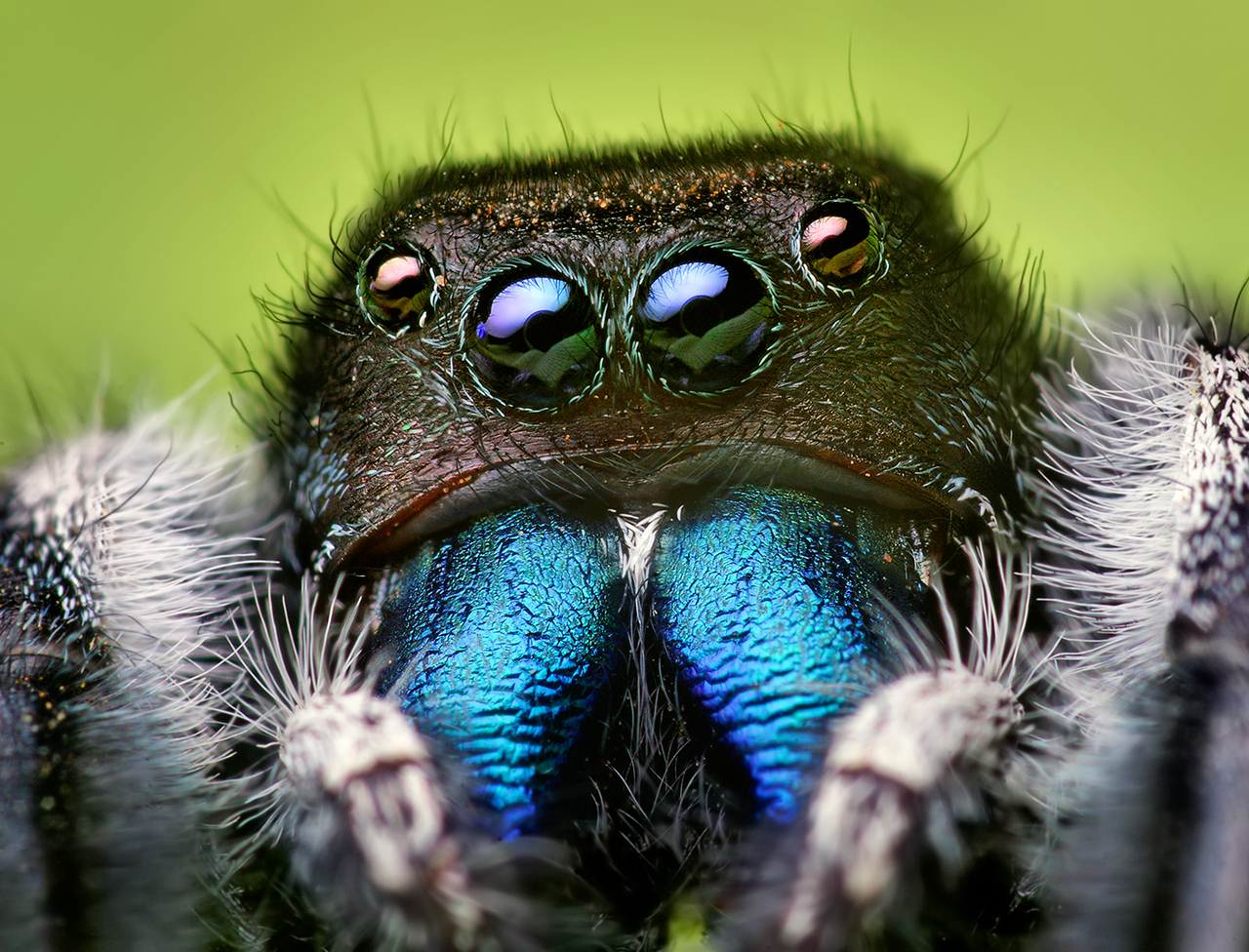
Iridescent chelicerae on an adult male P. audax

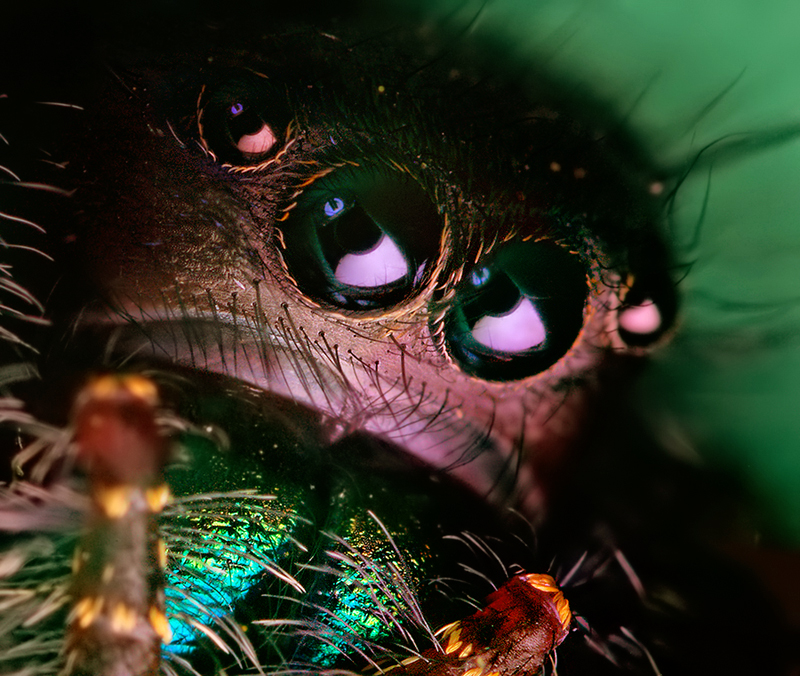
Eyes of a female P. audax

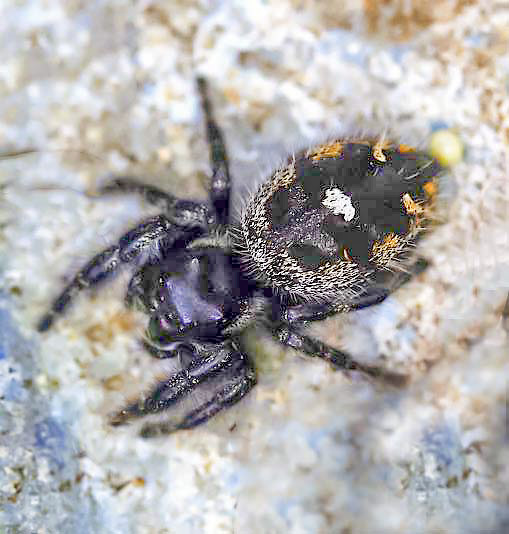
Bryantae variation
