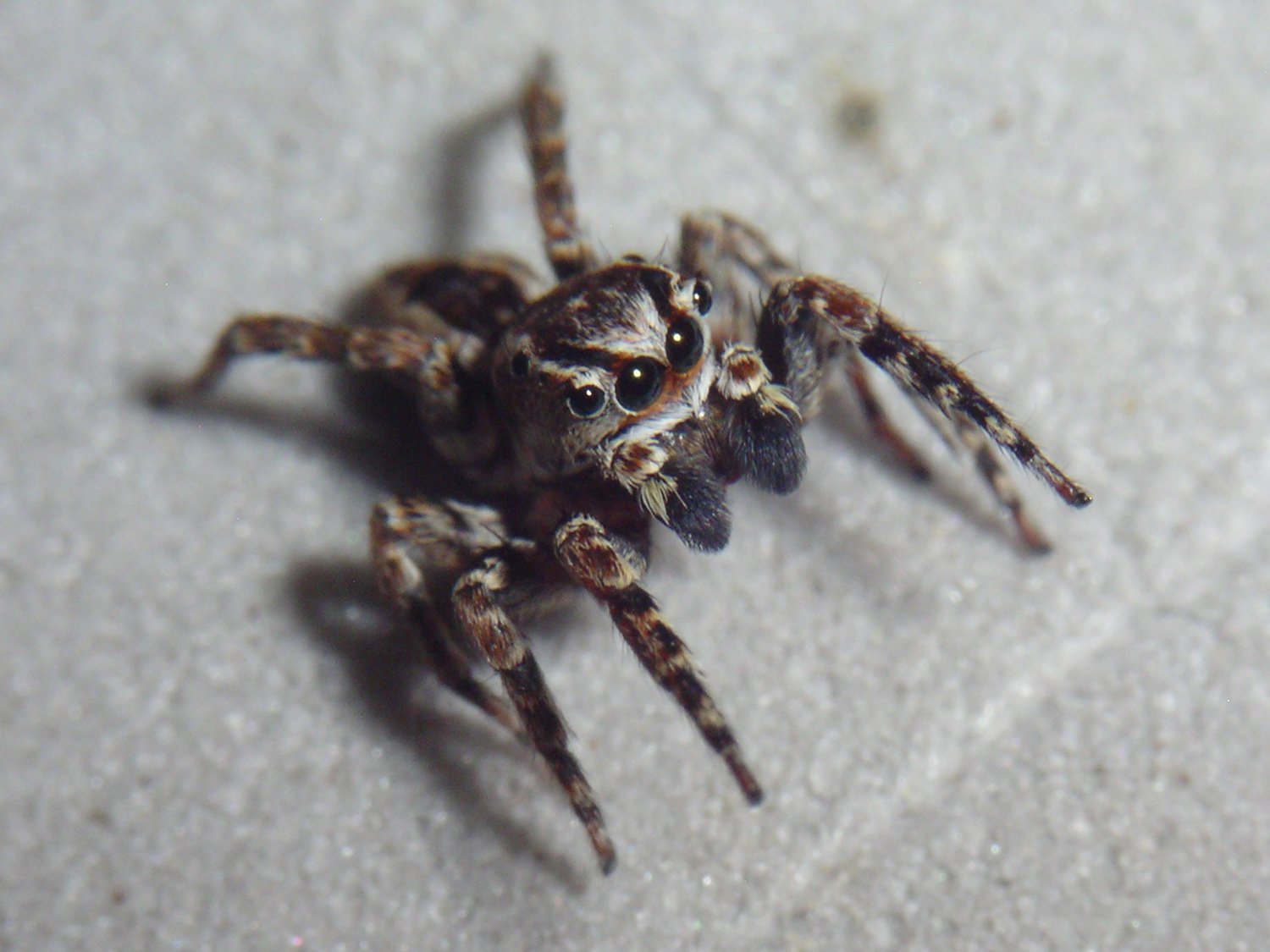
- Male Mexigonus sp. in Jalisco, Mexico

Scientific classification
- Kingdom: Animalia
- Phylum: Arthropoda
- Subphylum: Chelicerata
- Class: Arachnida
- Order: Araneae
- Infraorder: Araneomorphae
- Family: Salticidae
- Subfamily: Salticinae
- Genus: Mexigonus; Edwards, 2003

Type species
- M. minutus (F. O. Pickard-Cambridge, 1901)

Species
- 4, see text

= Mexigonus =

Genus of spiders

Mexigonus is a genus of North American jumping spiders that was first described by G. B. Edwards in 2003. The name is a reference to Mexico, where the first identified species were found.

== Species ==
As of July 2019 it contains four species, found only in Mexico and the United States:

- Mexigonus arizonensis (Banks, 1904) – USA, Mexico
- Mexigonus dentichelis (F. O. Pickard-Cambridge, 1901) – Mexico
- Mexigonus minutus (F. O. Pickard-Cambridge, 1901) (type) – USA, Mexico
- Mexigonus morosus (Peckham & Peckham, 1888) – USA
