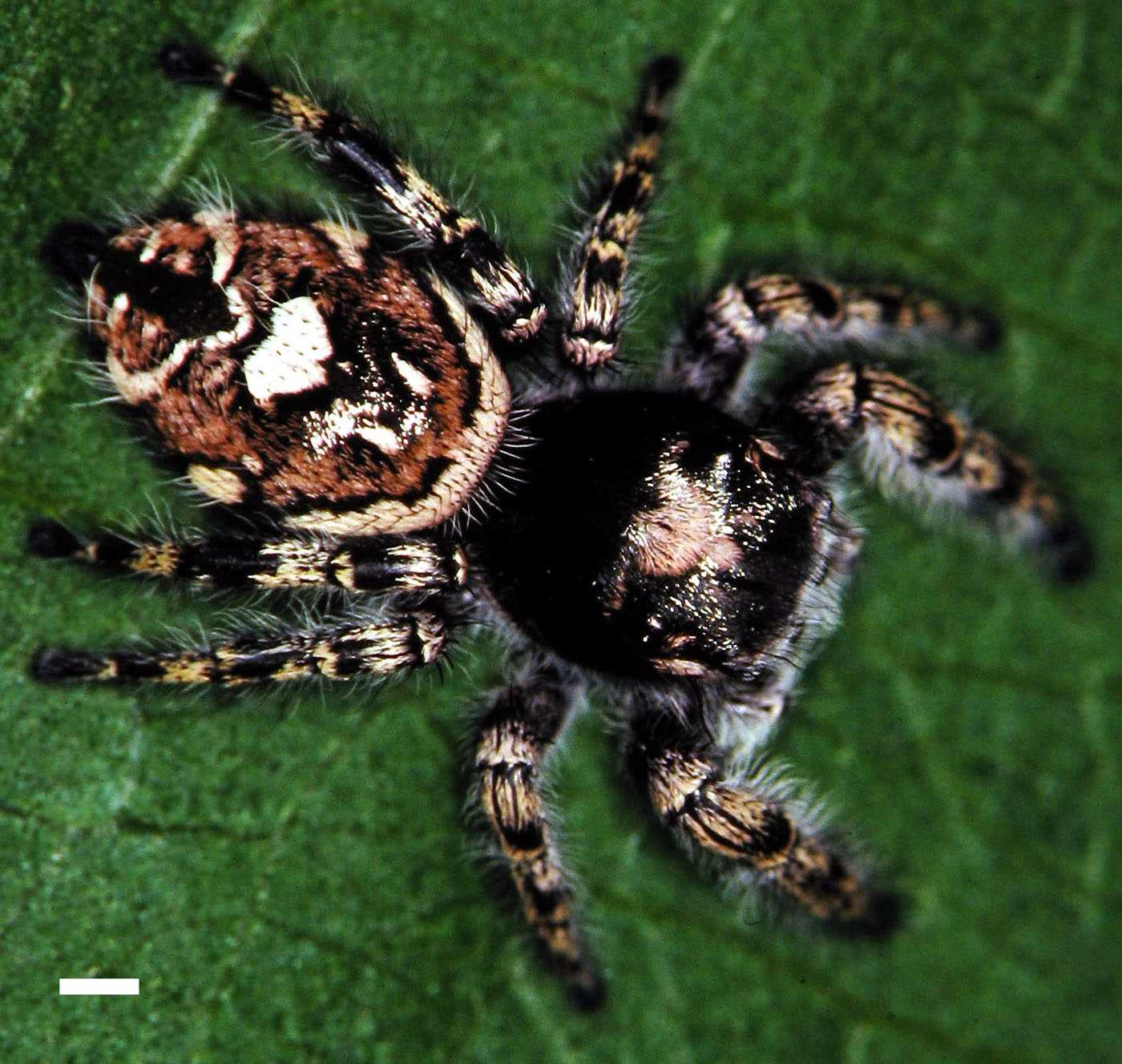
- Female Phidippus richmani in Ocala National Forest, Florida

Scientific classification
- Kingdom: Animalia
- Phylum: Arthropoda
- Subphylum: Chelicerata
- Class: Arachnida
- Order: Araneae
- Infraorder: Araneomorphae
- Family: Salticidae
- Genus: Phidippus
- Species: P. richmani

Binomial name
- Phidippus richmani (Edwards, 2004)

= Phidippus richmani =

Species of spider

Phidippus richmani is a species of jumping spider (Salticidae) native to the United States.
