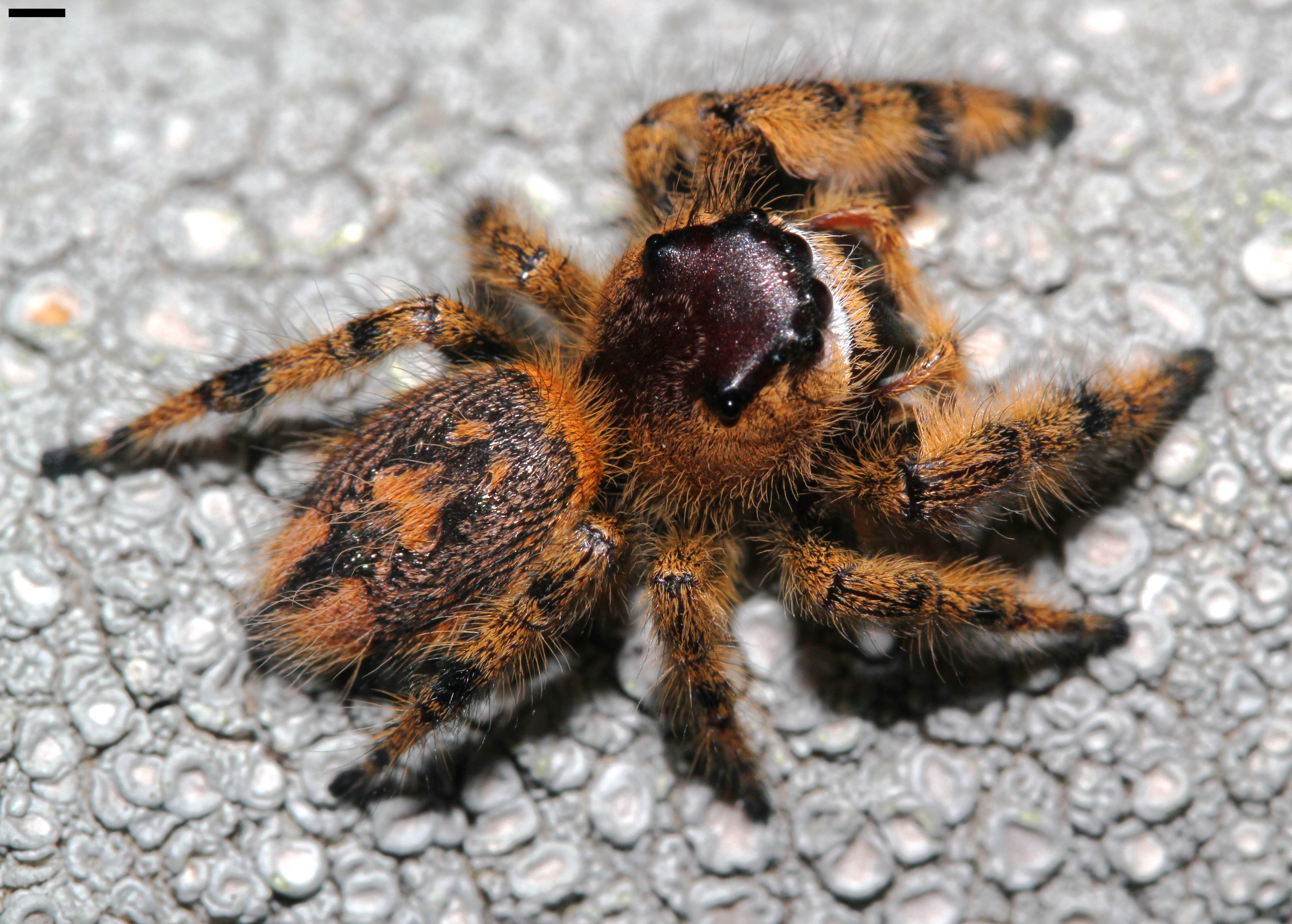
- Female
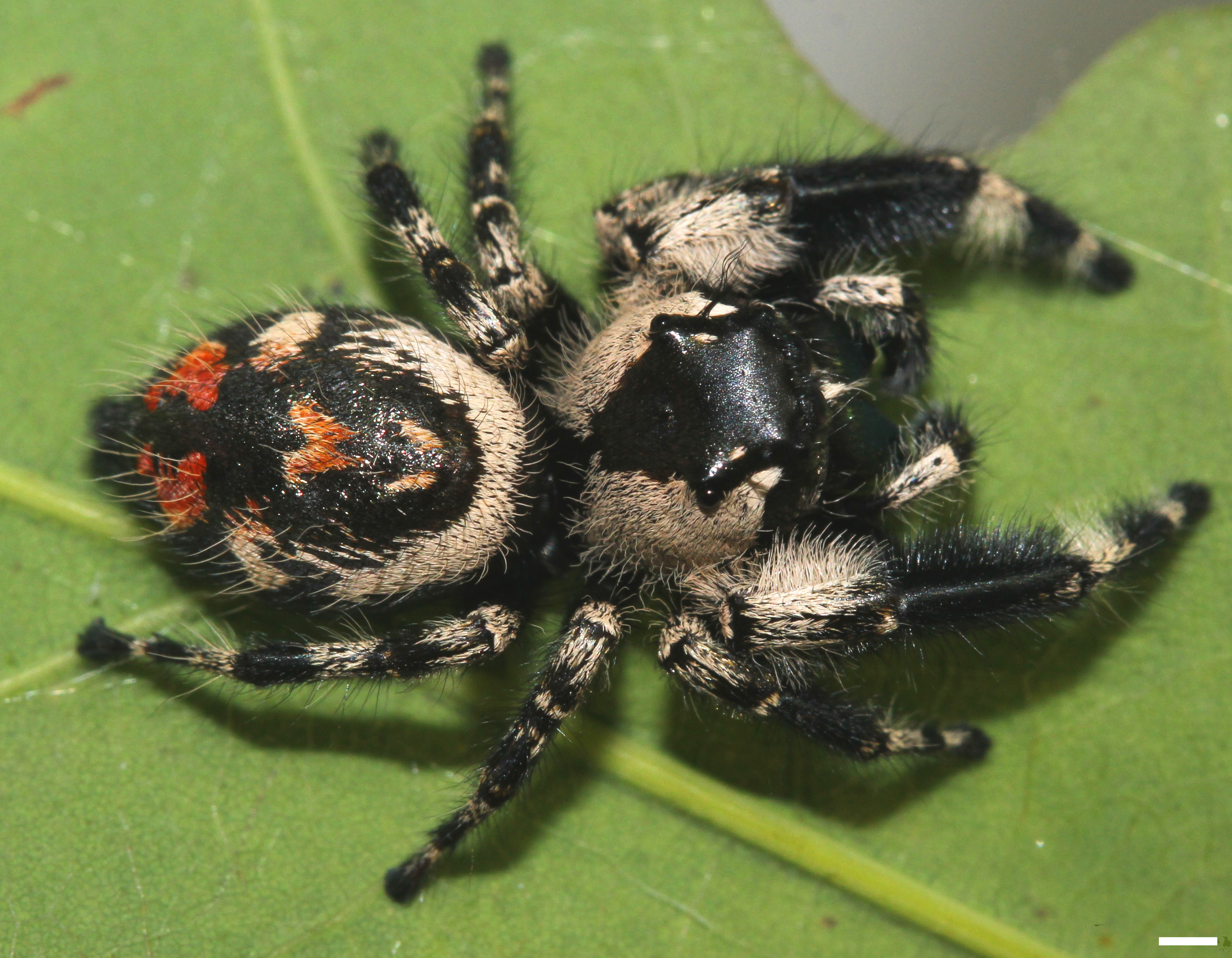
- Male

Scientific classification
- Kingdom: Animalia
- Phylum: Arthropoda
- Subphylum: Chelicerata
- Class: Arachnida
- Order: Araneae
- Infraorder: Araneomorphae
- Family: Salticidae
- Genus: Phidippus
- Species: P. otiosus

Binomial name
- Phidippus otiosus (Hentz, 1846)

Synonyms
- Attus pulcher Attus peregrinus Attus otiosus Phidippus carolinus Dendryphantes carolinus Dendryphantes otiosus Phidippus dorsalis Phidippus pulcher

= Phidippus otiosus =

Species of spider

Phidippus otiosus is a species of jumping spider that is found in southeastern North America. It is primarily a tree-living species. Females reach a body length of about 16 mm (0.63 in). Its iridescent chelicerae can range in color from purple to green.

== Life cycle ==
Females position their single egg sac under the bark of oak and pine trees. These are laid from December to February in South Carolina, and from January to June in Florida. The egg sac can hold anywhere from 19 to 150 eggs, and the spiderlings (slings) will disperse between January and February. The spiderlings mature during fall.

== Systematics ==
Phidippus otiosus is grouped with the closely related species P. californicus, P. pius and P. regius in the otiosus group.

== Distribution ==
Phidippus otiosus naturally occurs in the southeastern United States from Florida and Texas to North Carolina. However, this species is sometimes exported with plants such as Tillandsia, and has been found in countries as remote as Sweden and Germany.

== Name ==
The species name is possibly derived from Latin otium "leisure, peace, quiet" + the suffix -osus "full of, prone to", or from Ancient Greek oto- "ear", referring to the tufts of black hair.

A common name for this species is Canopy Jumping Spider.
