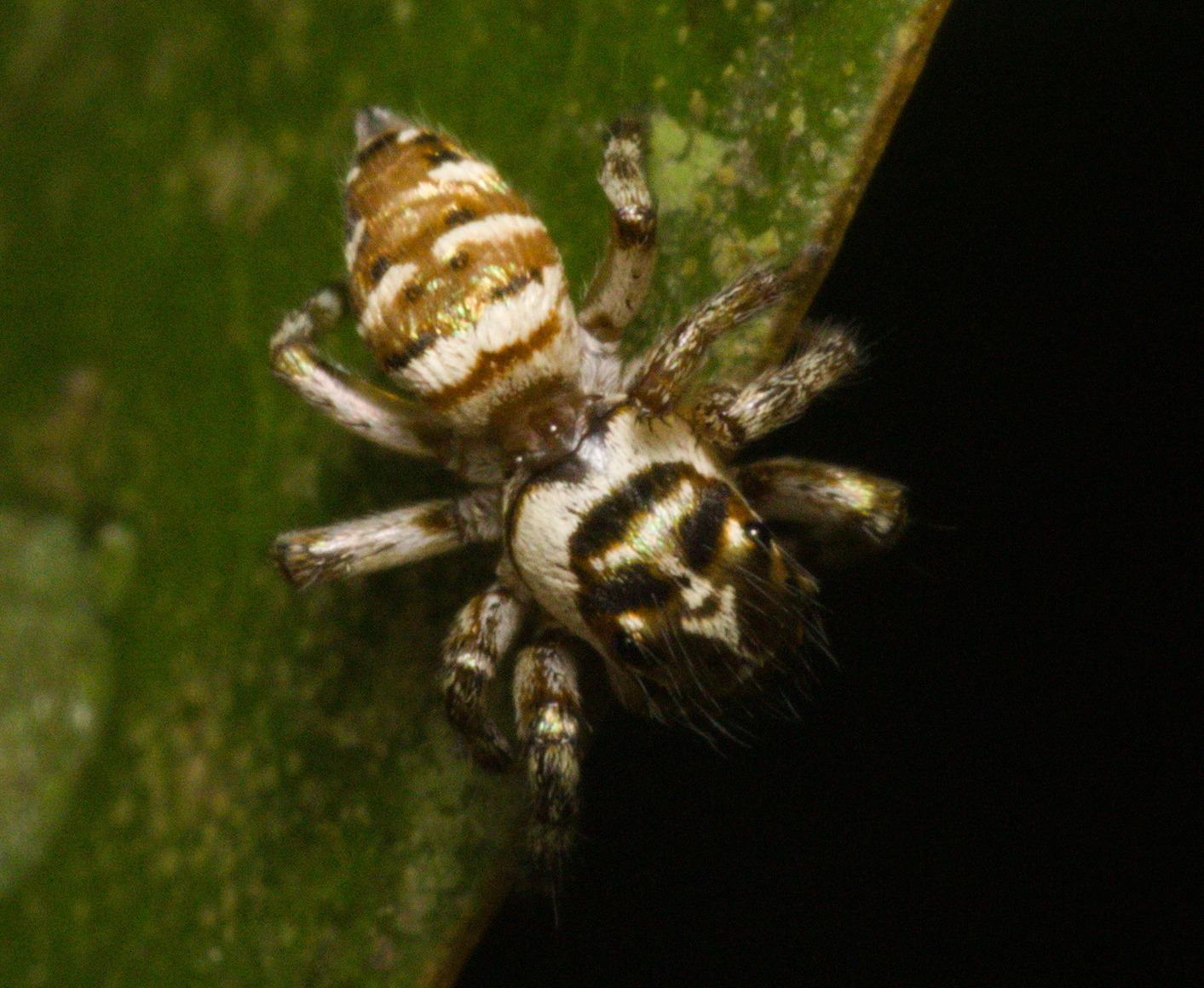
- P. micans from Brazil

Scientific classification
- Kingdom: Animalia
- Phylum: Arthropoda
- Subphylum: Chelicerata
- Class: Arachnida
- Order: Araneae
- Infraorder: Araneomorphae
- Family: Salticidae
- Subfamily: Salticinae
- Genus: Philira; Edwards, 2015

Type species
- Philira micans

Species
- Philira micans (Simon, 1902); Philira superba (Caporiacco, 1947); Philira toroi Rubio, Baigorria & Stolar, 2023

= Philira =

Genus of spiders

Philira is a genus of South American jumping spiders in the family Salticidae. It was first described in 2015 by G. B. Edwards.

== Species ==
As of January 2026, this genus includes three species:

- Philira micans (Simon, 1902) – Brazil, Paraguay
- Philira superba (Caporiacco, 1947) – Guyana
- Philira toroi Rubio, Baigorria & Stolar, 2023 – Argentina
