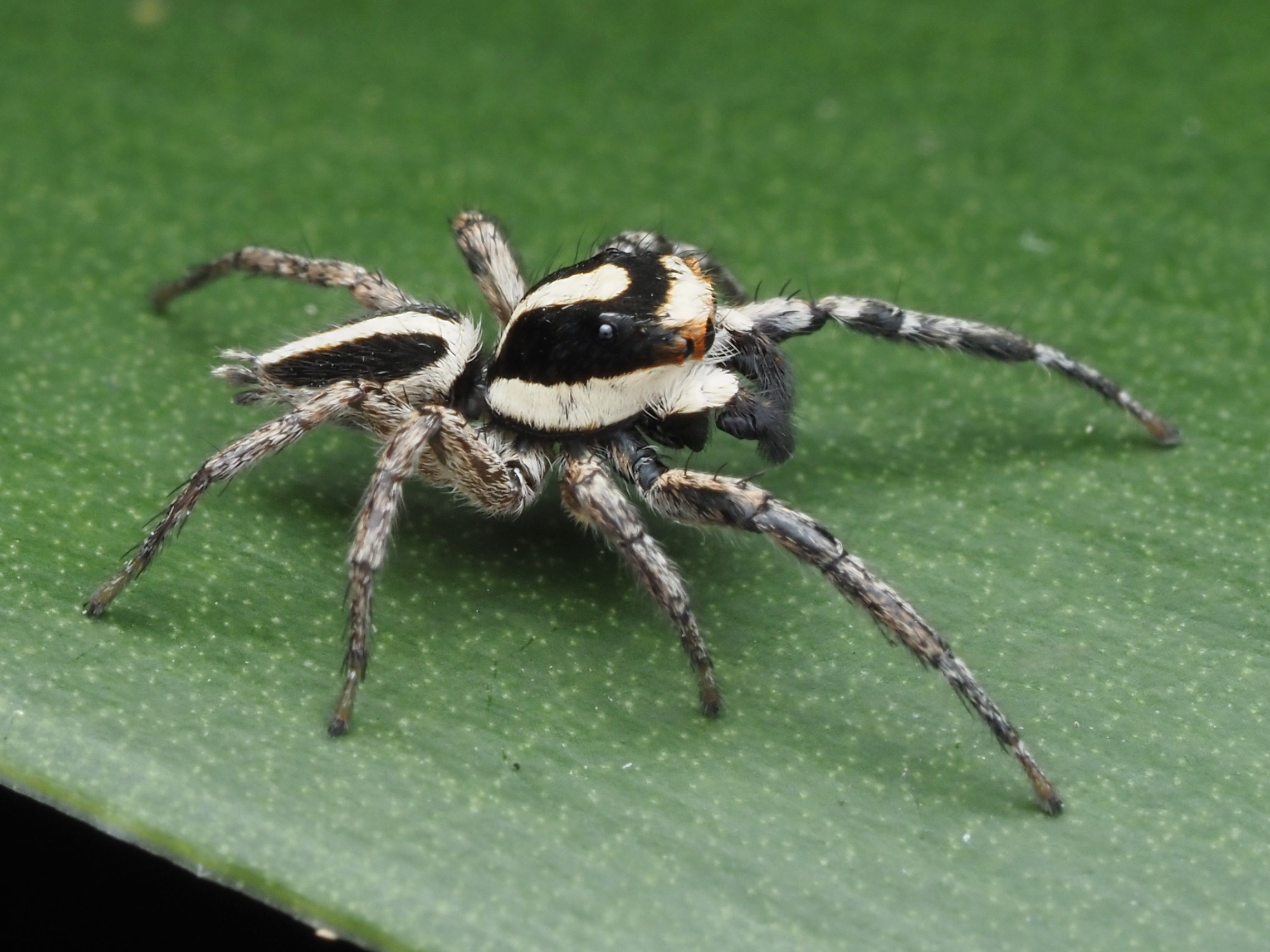
- Male Leptofreya bifurcata

Scientific classification
- Kingdom: Animalia
- Phylum: Arthropoda
- Subphylum: Chelicerata
- Class: Arachnida
- Order: Araneae
- Infraorder: Araneomorphae
- Family: Salticidae
- Subfamily: Salticinae
- Genus: Leptofreya; Edwards, 2015

Type species
- Leptofreya ambigua

Species
- See text

= Leptofreya =

Genus of spiders

Leptofreya is a genus of spiders in the family Salticidae. It was first described in 2015 by G. B. Edwards. It is found in the Americas from the United States to Brazil.

== Species ==
As of 2018, the World Spider Catalog lists the following species in the genus:

- Leptofreya ambigua (C. L. Koch, 1846) – Colombia to French Guiana, Brazil, introduced to United States
- Leptofreya bifurcata (F. O. Pickard-Cambridge, 1901) – Mexico, Panama
- Leptofreya laticava (F. O. Pickard-Cambridge, 1901) – Guatemala
- Leptofreya longispina (F. O. Pickard-Cambridge, 1901) – Guatemala, Panama
