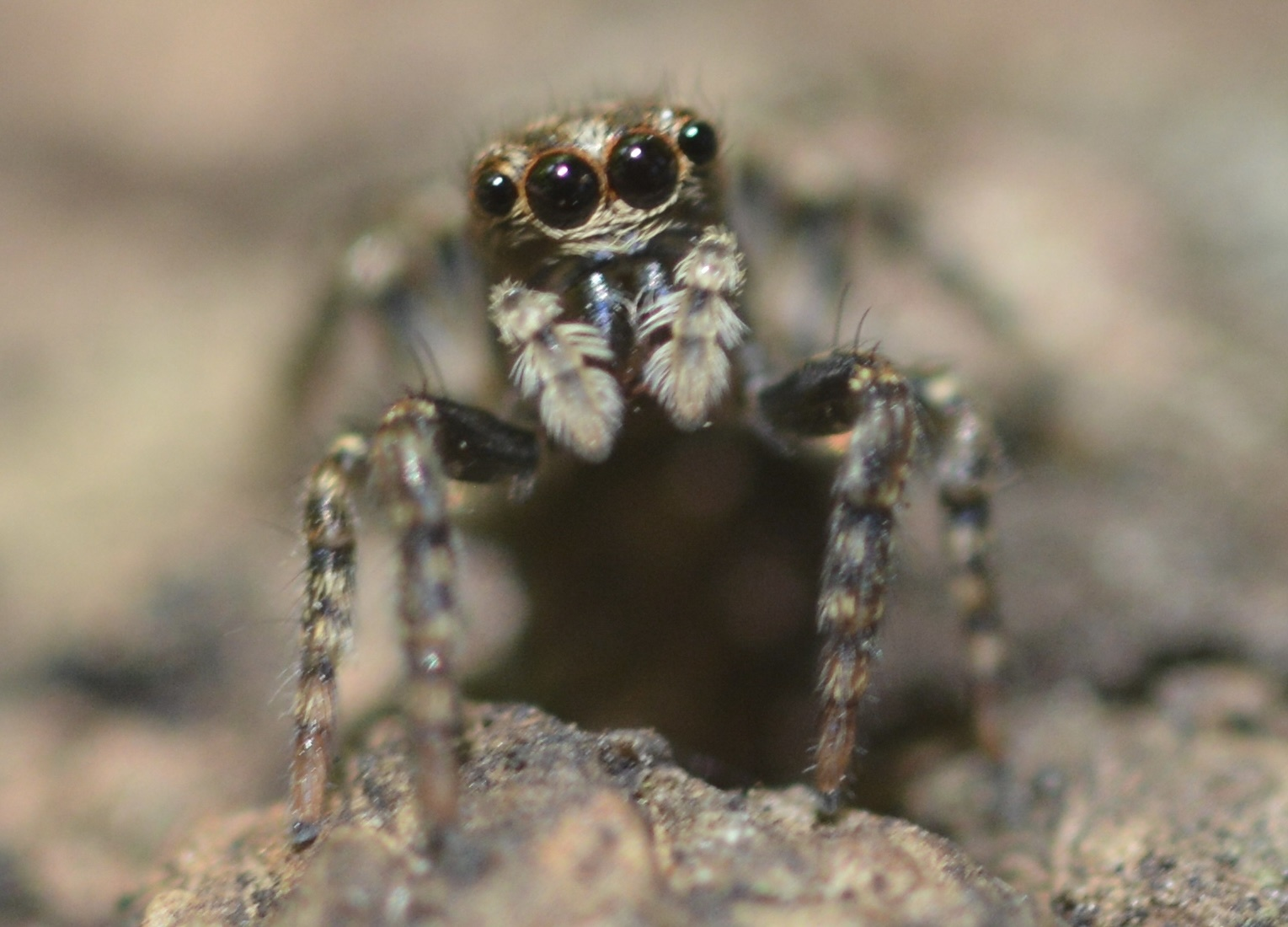

Scientific classification
- Kingdom: Animalia
- Phylum: Arthropoda
- Subphylum: Chelicerata
- Class: Arachnida
- Order: Araneae
- Infraorder: Araneomorphae
- Family: Salticidae
- Genus: Mexigonus
- Species: M. morosus

Binomial name
- Mexigonus morosus (Peckham & Peckham, 1888)

= Mexigonus morosus =

Species of spider

Mexigonus morosus is a species of jumping spider in the family Salticidae. It is found in the United States and Mexico.
