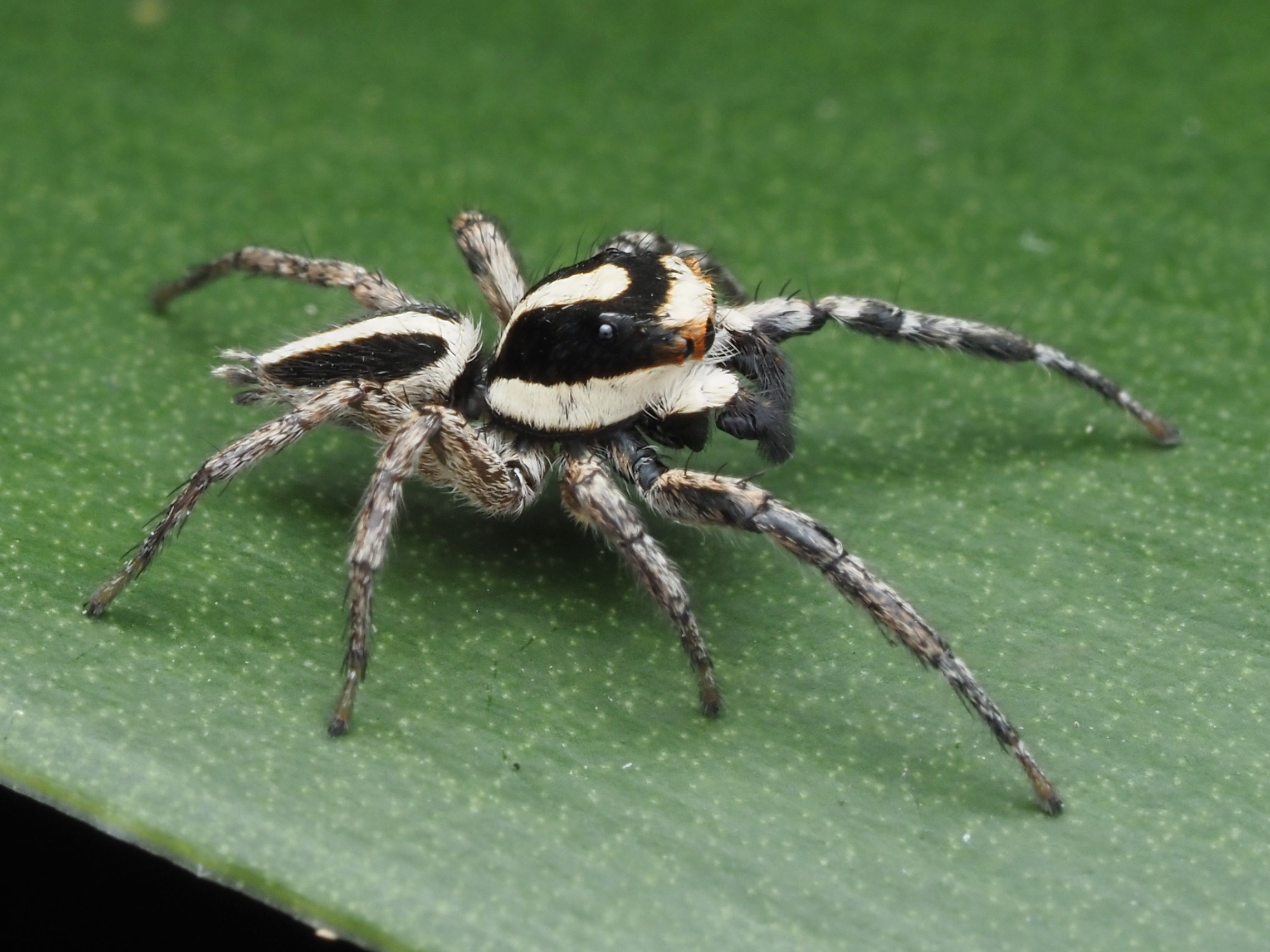
- Male

Scientific classification
- Kingdom: Animalia
- Phylum: Arthropoda
- Subphylum: Chelicerata
- Class: Arachnida
- Order: Araneae
- Infraorder: Araneomorphae
- Family: Salticidae
- Genus: Leptofreya
- Species: L. bifurcata

Binomial name
- Leptofreya bifurcata (F. O. Pickard-Cambridge, 1901)

= Leptofreya bifurcata =

Species of spider

Leptofreya bifurcata is a species of jumping spider. The species was first described by F. O. Pickard-Cambridge in 1901.

== Range ==
Leptofreya bifurcata has been observed from Mexico to Panama.
