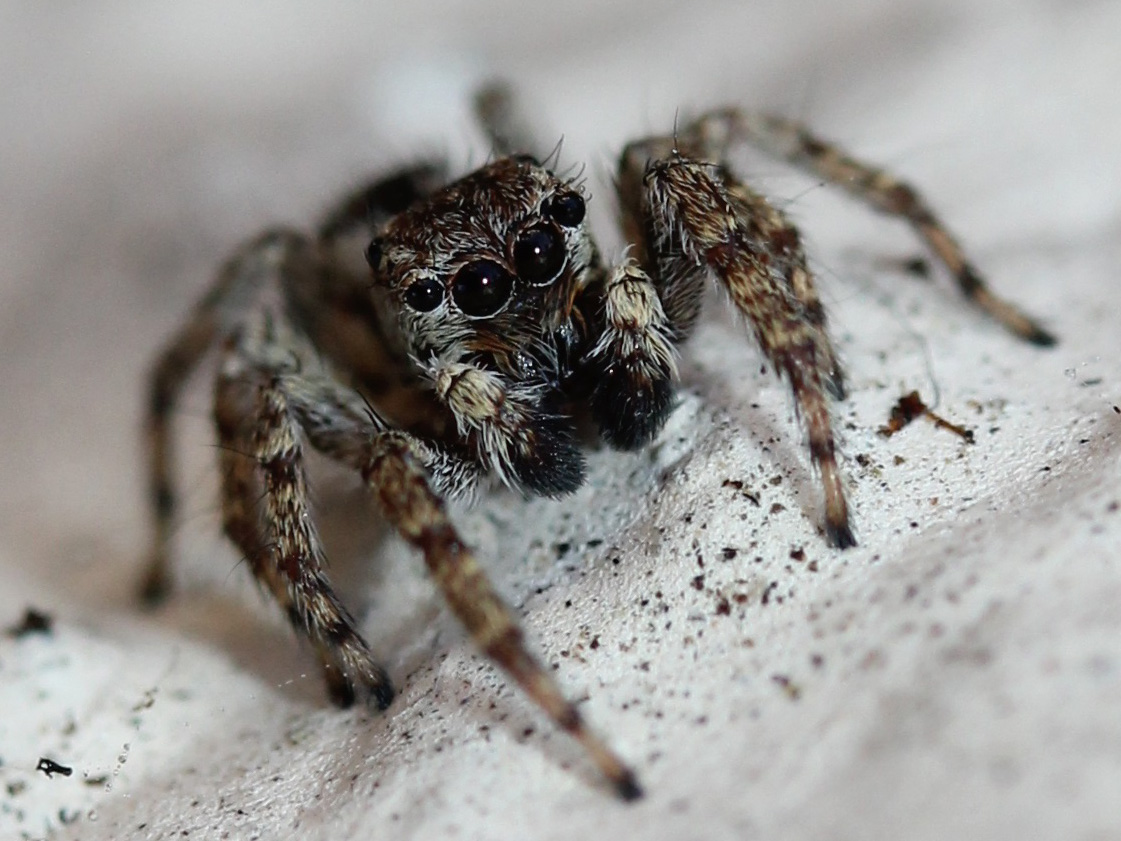
- Male in San Diego, California

Scientific classification
- Kingdom: Animalia
- Phylum: Arthropoda
- Subphylum: Chelicerata
- Class: Arachnida
- Order: Araneae
- Infraorder: Araneomorphae
- Family: Salticidae
- Genus: Mexigonus
- Species: M. minutus

Binomial name
- Mexigonus minutus (F. O. P.-Cambridge, 1901)

= Mexigonus minutus =

Species of spider

Mexigonus minutus is a species of jumping spider in the family Salticidae. It is found in the United States and Mexico.
