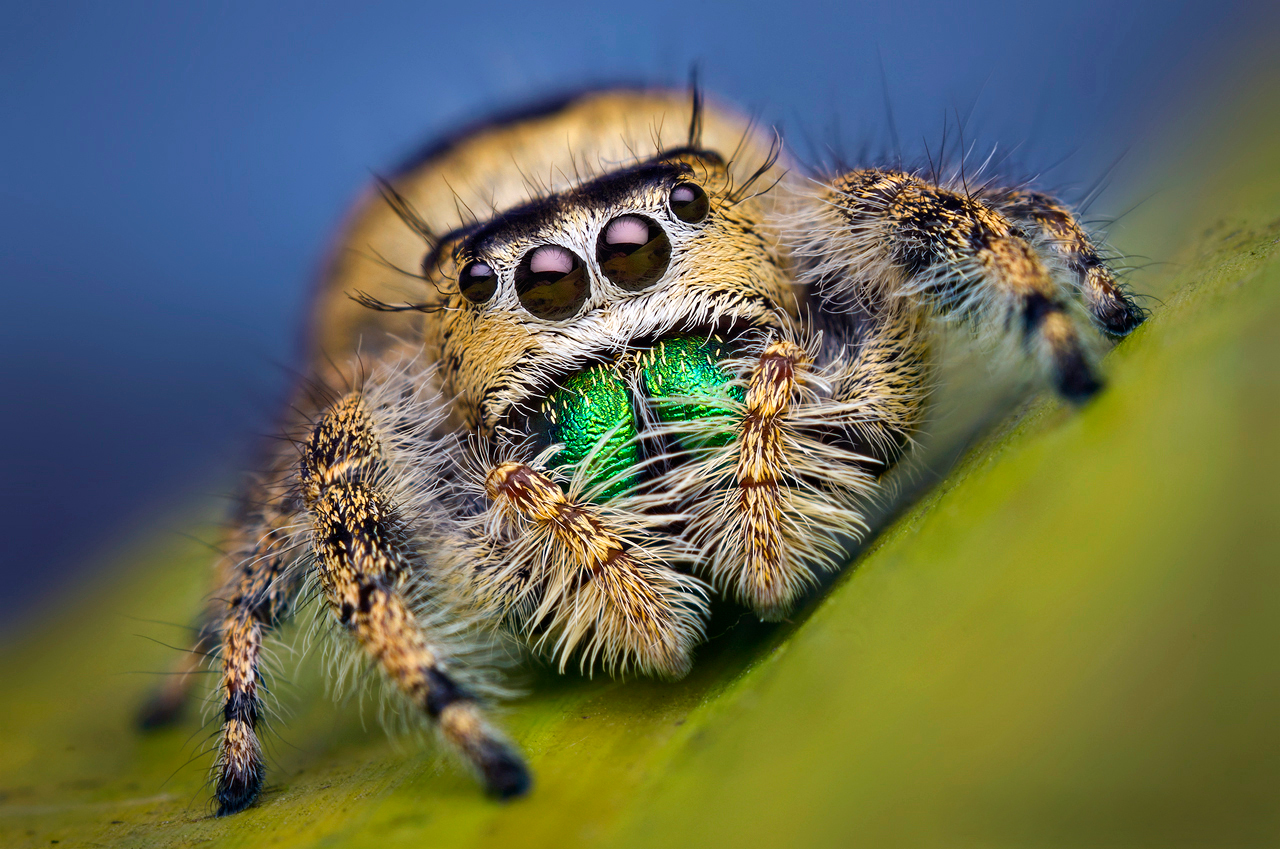
- Female

Scientific classification
- Kingdom: Animalia
- Phylum: Arthropoda
- Subphylum: Chelicerata
- Class: Arachnida
- Order: Araneae
- Infraorder: Araneomorphae
- Family: Salticidae
- Genus: Phidippus
- Species: P. workmani

Binomial name
- Phidippus workmani (Peckham & Peckham, 1901)

Synonyms
- Phidippus xeros (Edwards, 1978)

= Phidippus workmani =

Species of spider

Phidippus workmani is a species of jumping spider found in the southeastern United States.
