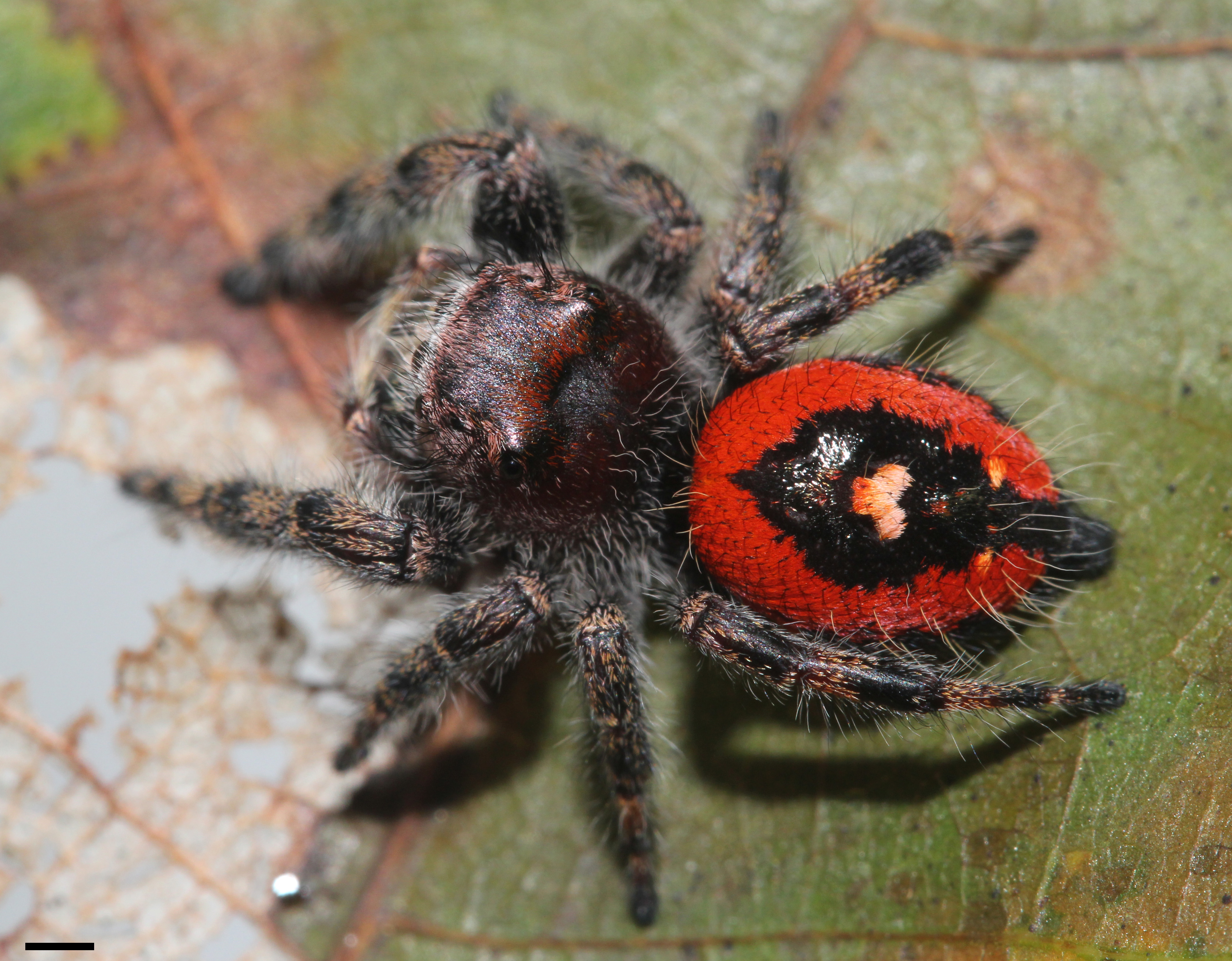
- Female
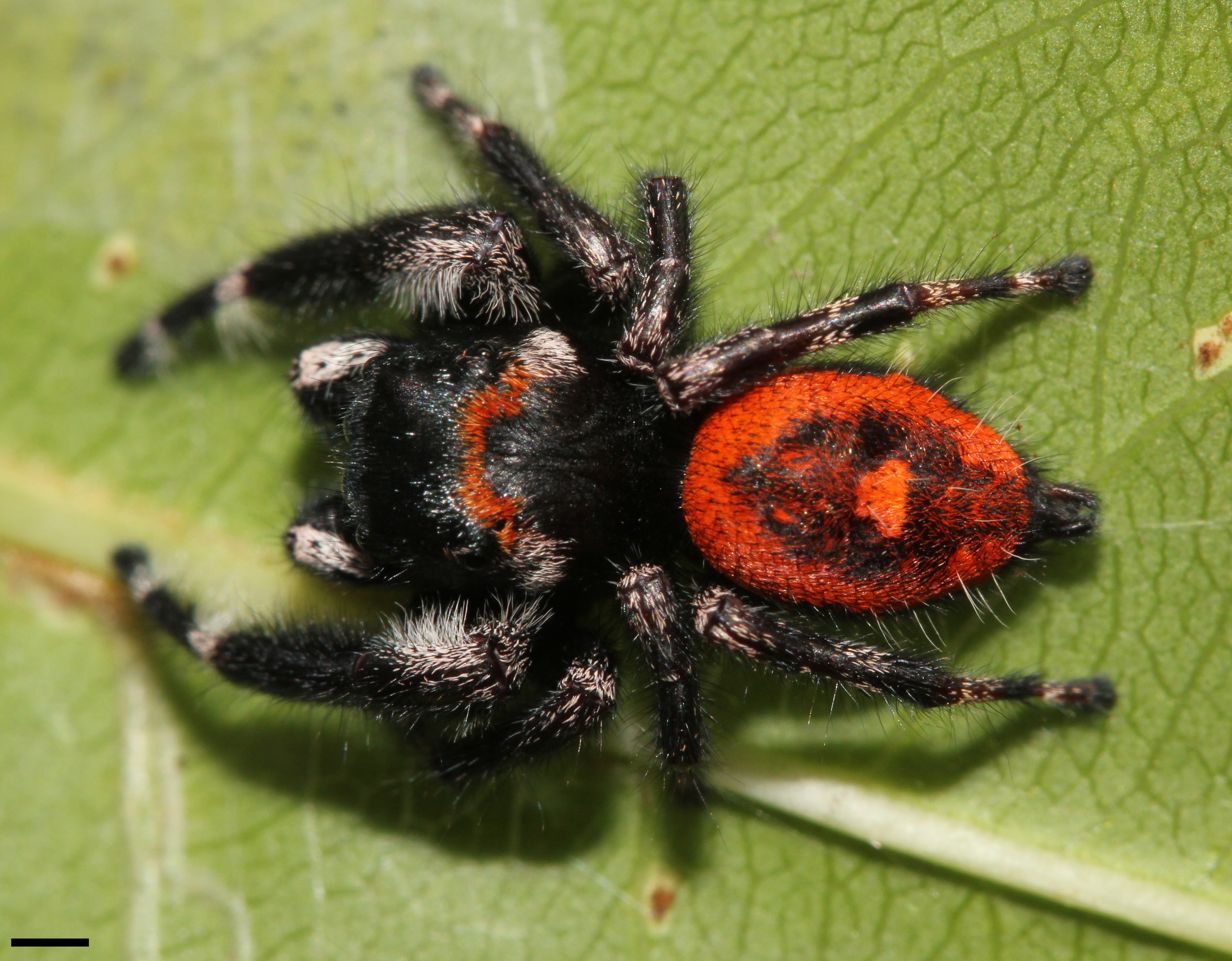
- Male

Scientific classification
- Kingdom: Animalia
- Phylum: Arthropoda
- Subphylum: Chelicerata
- Class: Arachnida
- Order: Araneae
- Infraorder: Araneomorphae
- Family: Salticidae
- Genus: Phidippus
- Species: P. princeps
- Subspecies: P. p. pulcherrimus

Trinomial name
- Phidippus princeps pulcherrimus Keyserling, 1885

= Phidippus princeps pulcherrimus =

Subspecies of spider

Phidippus princeps pulcherrimus is a subspecies of spider in the Salticidae (jumping spider) family. It belongs to the species Phidippus princeps and is found in the United States.
