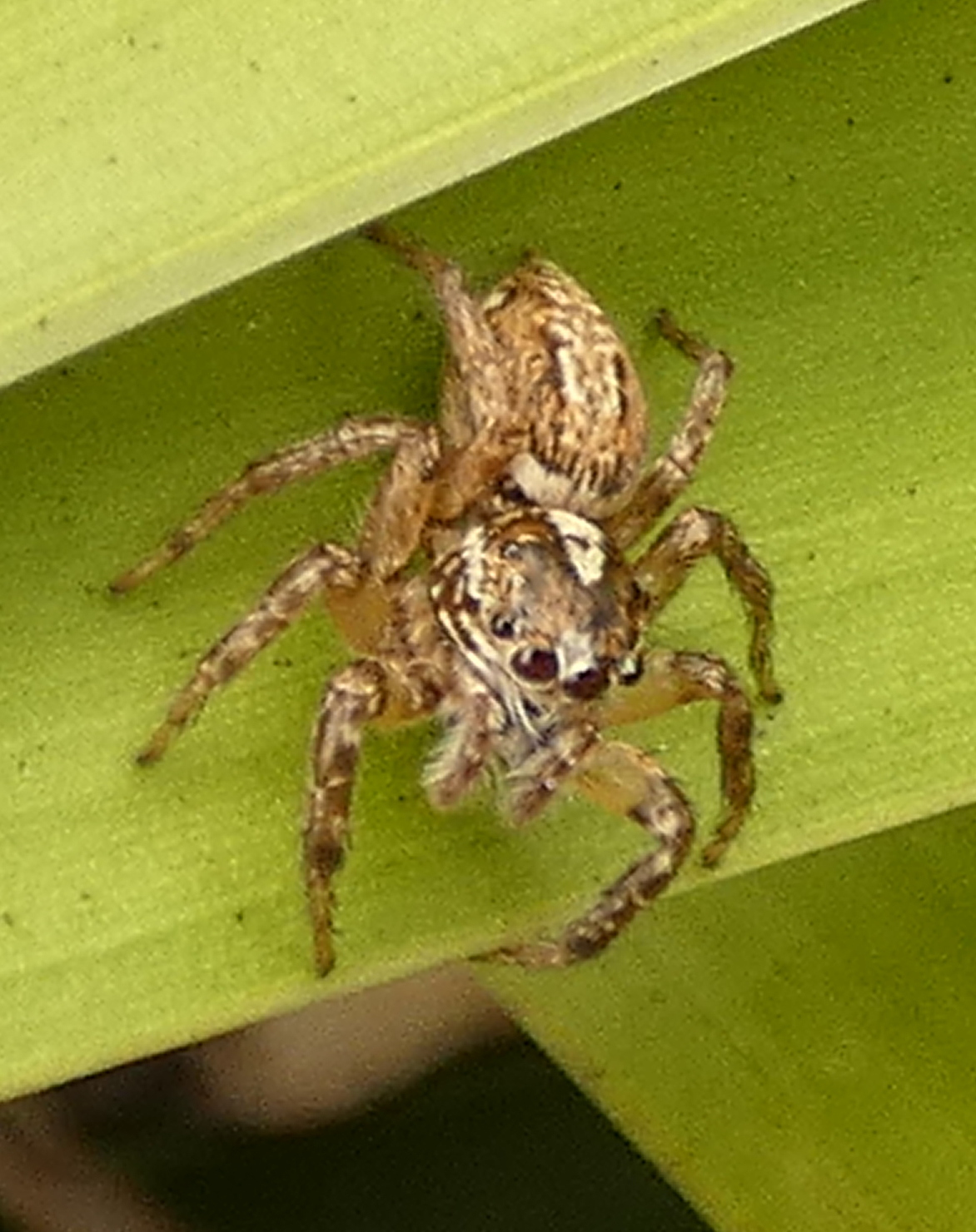
- Female
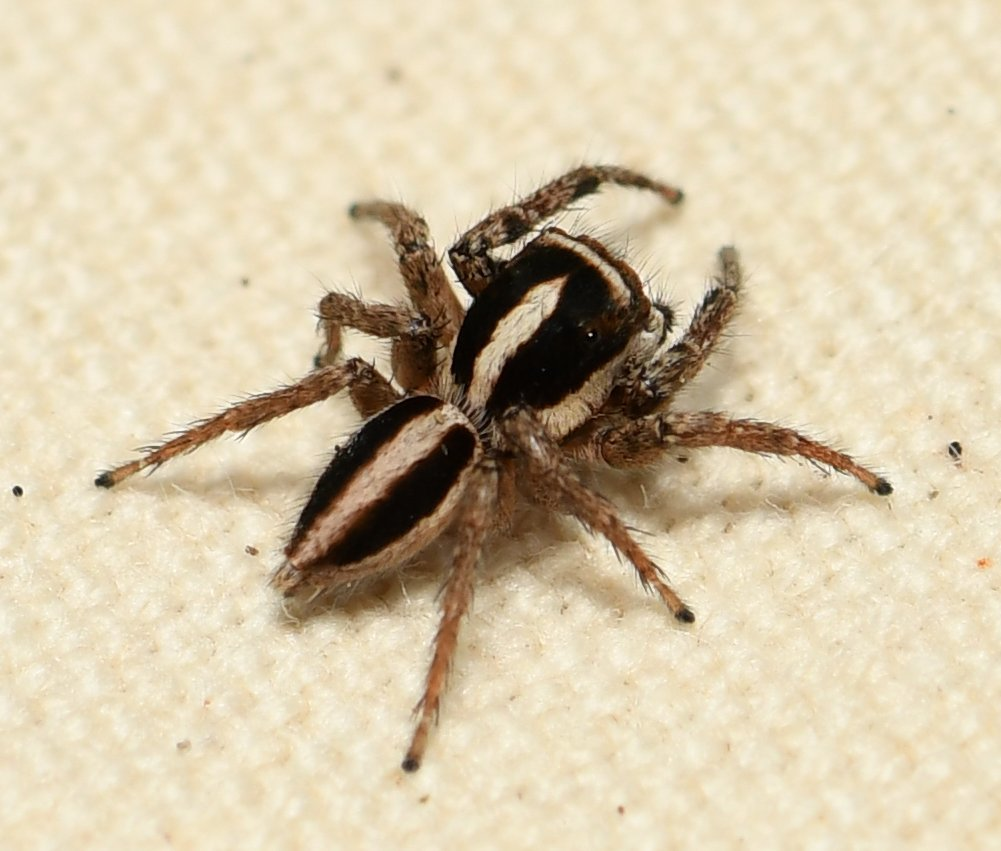
- Male

Scientific classification
- Kingdom: Animalia
- Phylum: Arthropoda
- Subphylum: Chelicerata
- Class: Arachnida
- Order: Araneae
- Infraorder: Araneomorphae
- Family: Salticidae
- Genus: Leptofreya
- Species: L. ambigua

Binomial name
- Leptofreya ambigua (C.L.Koch, 1846)

Synonyms
- Freya ambigua (C. L. Koch, 1846); Leptofreya albovittata (Schenkel, 1953); Leptofreya fannae (G. W. Peckham & E. G. Peckham, 1896); Leptofreya perelegans (Simon, 1902)

= Leptofreya ambigua =

Species of spider

Leptofreya ambigua is a species of jumping spider. The species was first described by Carl Ludwig Koch in 1846.

== Range ==
Leptofreya ambigua is native to the Amazon basin in South America. It has also been introduced in the United States, specifically Florida and Texas.
