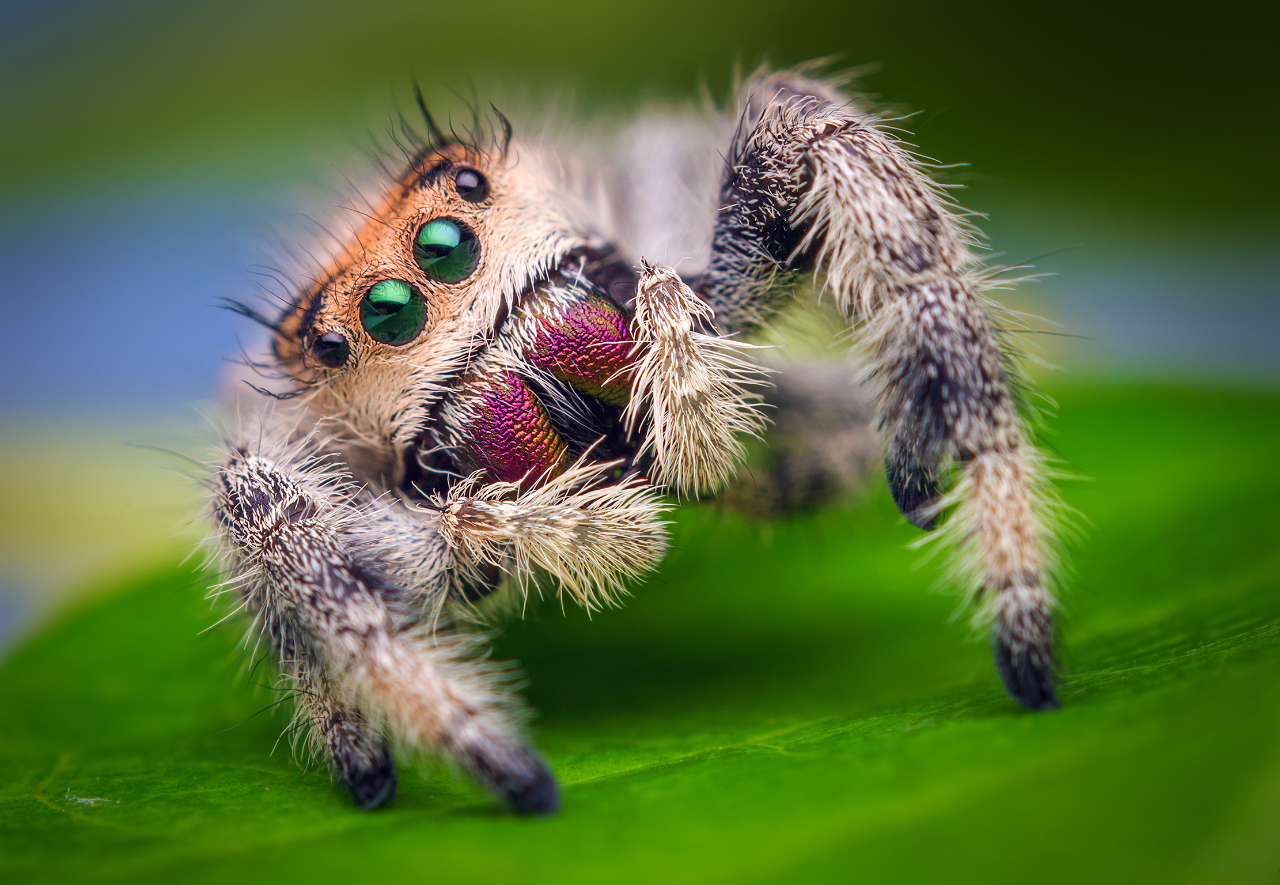
- Adult female from Florida

Scientific classification
- Kingdom: Animalia
- Phylum: Arthropoda
- Subphylum: Chelicerata
- Class: Arachnida
- Order: Araneae
- Infraorder: Araneomorphae
- Family: Salticidae
- Genus: Phidippus
- Species: P. regius

Binomial name
- Phidippus regius C. L. Koch, 1846

Synonyms
- Attus miniatus Peckham & Peckham, 1883; Attus regius (C. L. Koch, 1846); Cyrtonota regia (C. L. Koch, 1846); Dendryphantes miniatus (Peckham & Peckham, 1883); Dendryphantes morsitans Simon, 1916; Dendryphantes regius (C. L. Koch, 1846); Dendryphantes tullgreni (Wallace, 1950); Dendryphantes variegatus Franganillo, 1930; Dendryphantes variegatus var. limbatus Franganillo, 1930; Phidippus miniatus (Peckham & Peckham, 1883); Phidippus purpurifer C. L. Koch, 1846; Phidippus tullgreni Wallace, 1950); Phidippus variegatus (Franganillo, 1930); Salticus sagraeus Lucas, 1857

= Phidippus regius =

Species of jumping spider in the genus Phidippus

Phidippus regius, commonly known as the regal jumper, is a species of jumping spider (family Salticidae) found in parts of the United States and the Caribbean. It is the largest species of jumping spider in eastern North America.

== Description ==
Adult male P. regius measure 12 mm (0.47 in) long on average, but can range between 6 and 18 mm (0.24 and 0.71 in) long. The first pair of legs, which are disproportionately larger in large males, have an alternating black and white fringe. The opisthosoma is black with several white markings on the dorsum: a basal band, a central triangular spot, and two posterior oval spots. The chelicerae are large and iridescent green-blue-violet in color, with a tubercle on each.

Adult female P. regius measure 15 mm (0.59 in) long on average, with a range between 7 and 22 mm (0.28 and 0.87 in). They may exhibit white or orange markings on the opisthosoma similar to those seen in males, but the rest of the body is largely covered with scales that may be brown, orange, tan, gray, or combinations thereof. The chelicerae are iridescent green or red-violet but lack the tubercles present in males. Females have several tufts of setae around the eyes that males lack.

The juvenile P. regius is pale brown, with reddish-brown markings on the opisthosoma rimmed with black. The fangs are dark red. In southern populations, juvenile females may develop scales as early as the third instar, while males remain black and white throughout their life cycle.

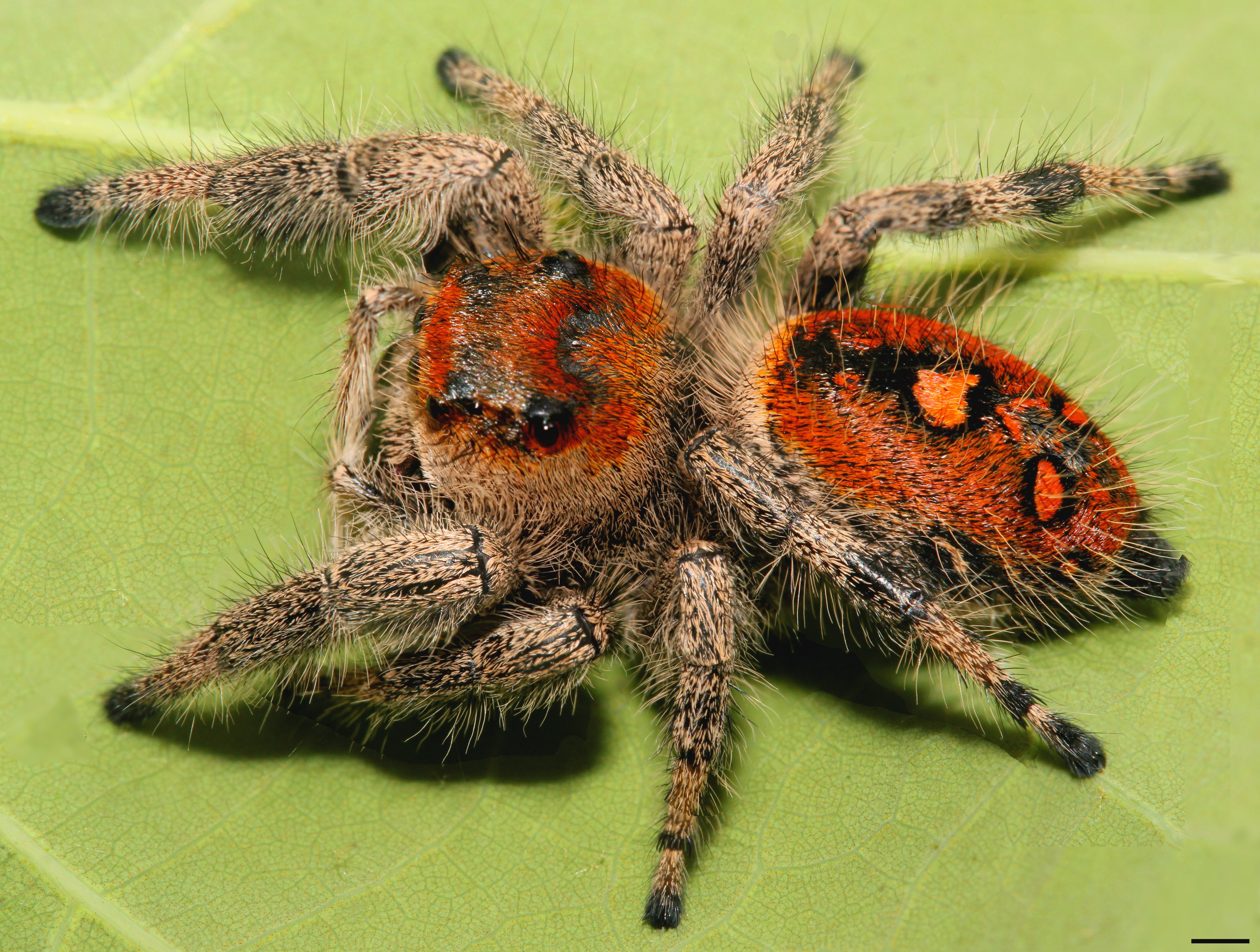
Adult female (orange form), Florida

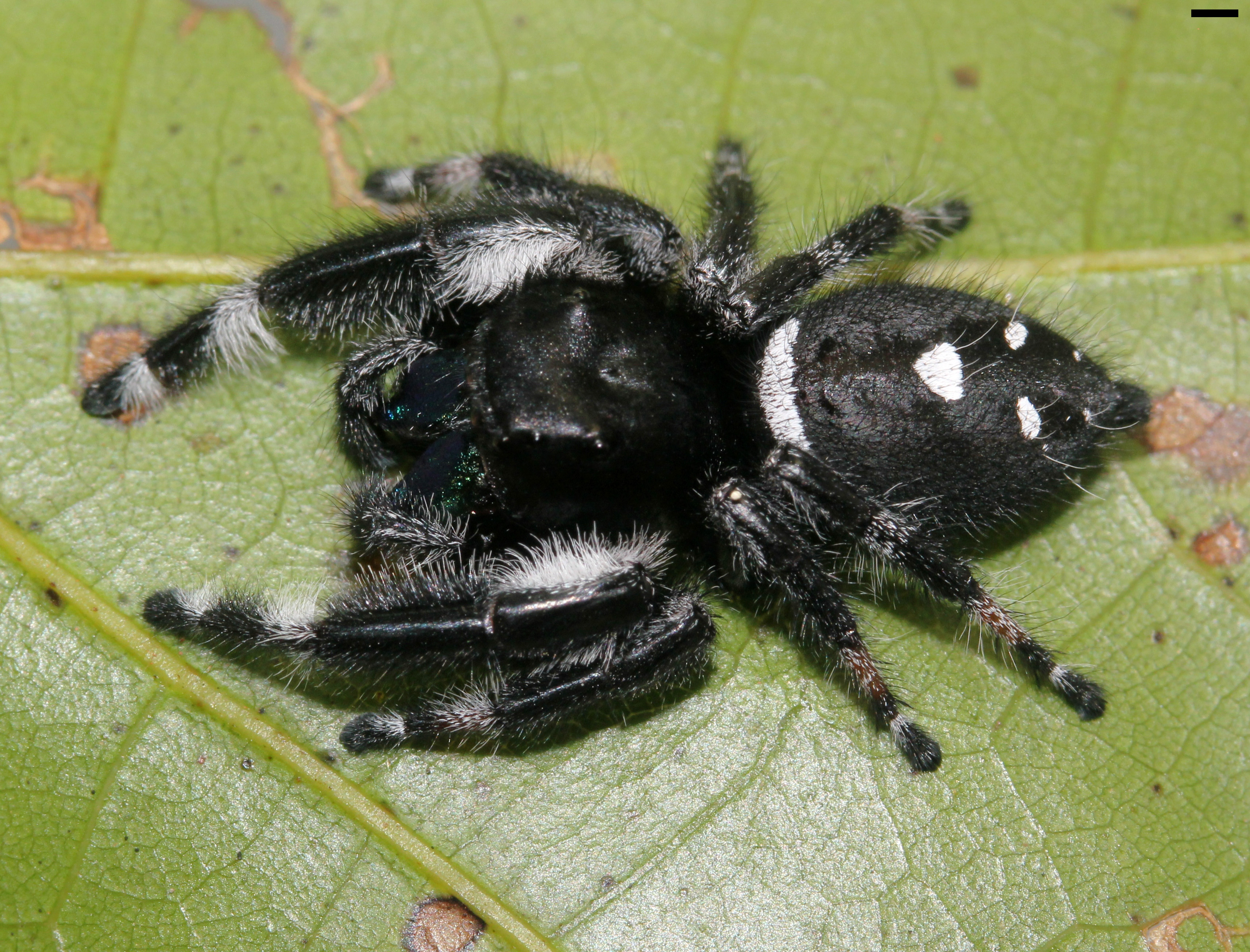
Adult male, Nassau County, Florida

Although P. regius is considered minimally harmful to humans, there have been documented cases where the bite caused severe pain similar to a bee sting, with swelling lasting up to three months. This reaction is likely due to individual sensitivity or localized inflammation.

== Habitat ==
A regal jumper staying near its shelter on a thistle. It attempts to capture a small winged insect.

P. regius is most commonly found in relatively open areas, such as fields and light woodland, with adults often hunting on trees or building walls. They build silken nests at night in which to sleep, often inside palm fronds or similar shelters. Females lay their eggs under tree bark or within wooden structures such as barns.

== Distribution ==
P. regius occurs in the southeastern United States, The Bahamas, Bermuda, and the Greater Antilles, and has been introduced to Easter Island. In the United States, it occurs throughout the southeast from southern Mississippi through North Carolina and South Carolina, and is most abundant in Florida.

== In captivity ==
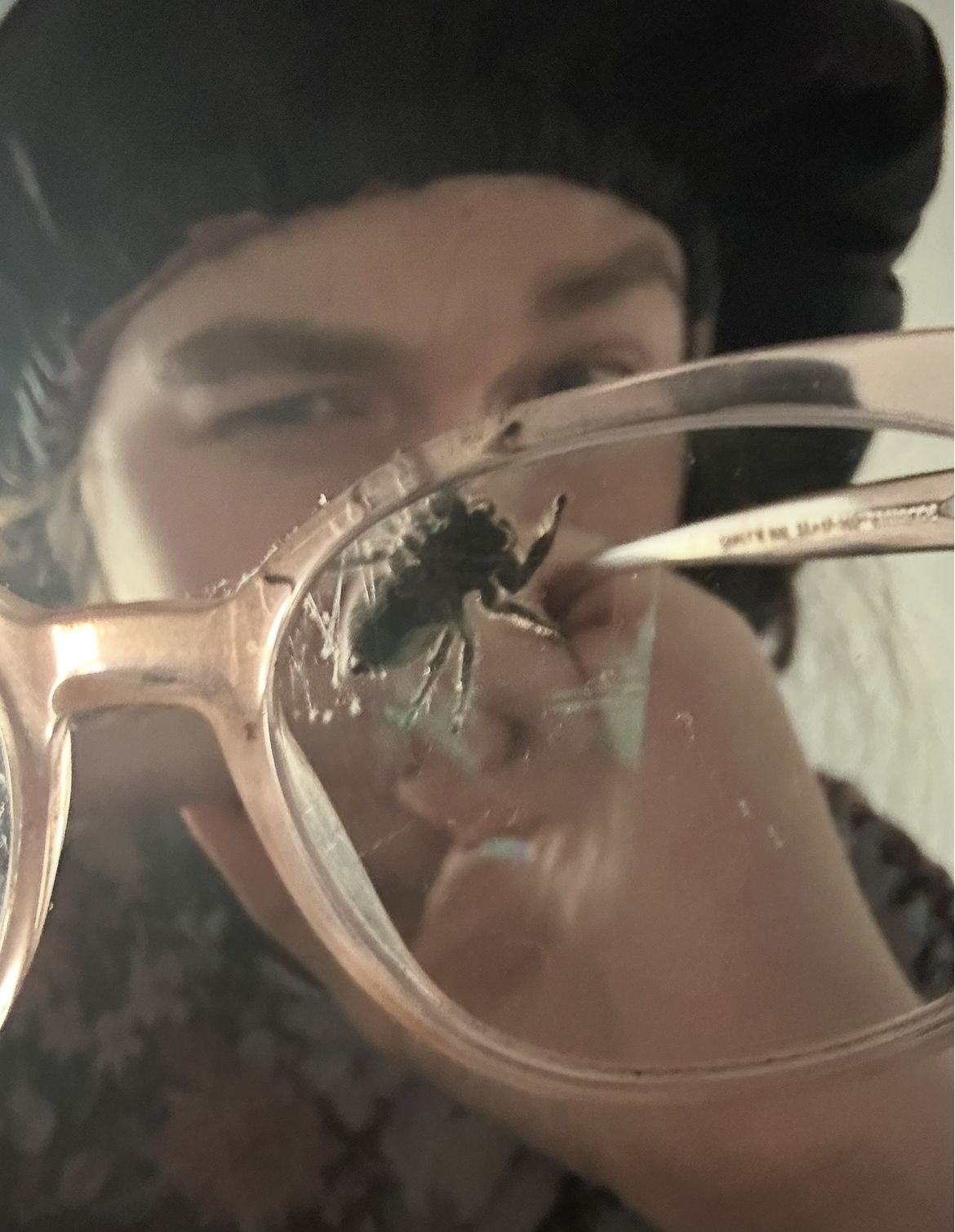
A pet Phidippus regius making a web on owners glasses (while worn), showing how this species of jumping spider can feel very safe around human owners.

Although exotic pet owners have kept P. regius since the 1970s, it wasn't until the 2017 and into the 2020s that they began being kept by the general public. Web series turned Television show Lucas the Spider (2017), and popular online social media pages such as @AracelisMiniCositas, @Lisa.The.Spider, @Daily.Spiders, and others have boosted their popularity significantly, leading to this species as well as the closely related Phidippus audax to be commonly available in chain pet stores in the United States and Canada. In 2026, Build-A-Bear Workshop created a jumping spider plush, further exhibiting their rise in popularity as pets.
