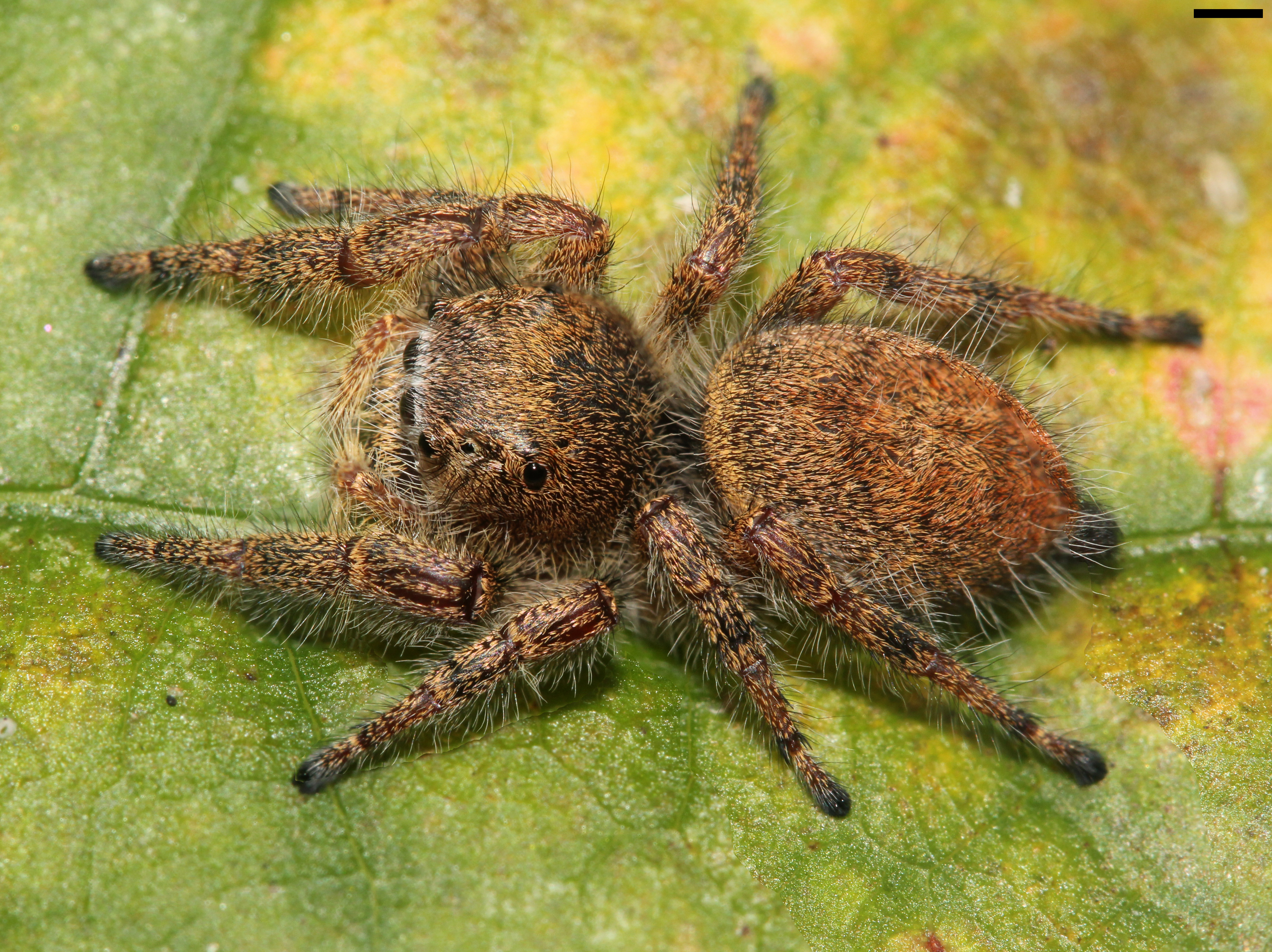
- Female
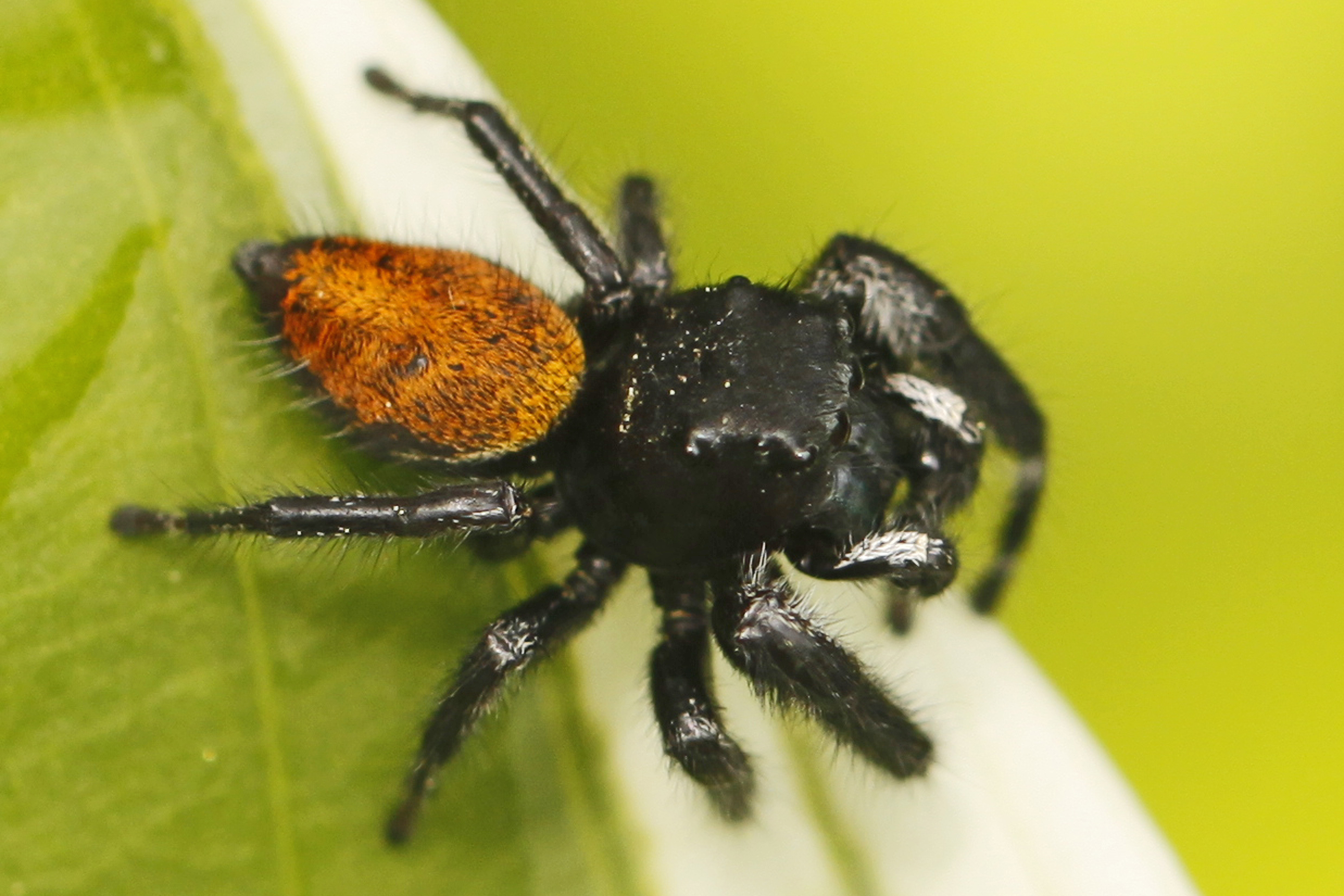
- Male

Scientific classification
- Kingdom: Animalia
- Phylum: Arthropoda
- Subphylum: Chelicerata
- Class: Arachnida
- Order: Araneae
- Infraorder: Araneomorphae
- Family: Salticidae
- Genus: Phidippus
- Species: P. princeps

Binomial name
- Phidippus princeps (Peckham & Peckham, 1883)

= Phidippus princeps =

Species of spider

Phidippus princeps is a species of jumping spider found in Canada and the eastern United States. These jumping spiders' vision exceeds by a factor of ten than that of a dragonfly's, which have the best vision among insects.

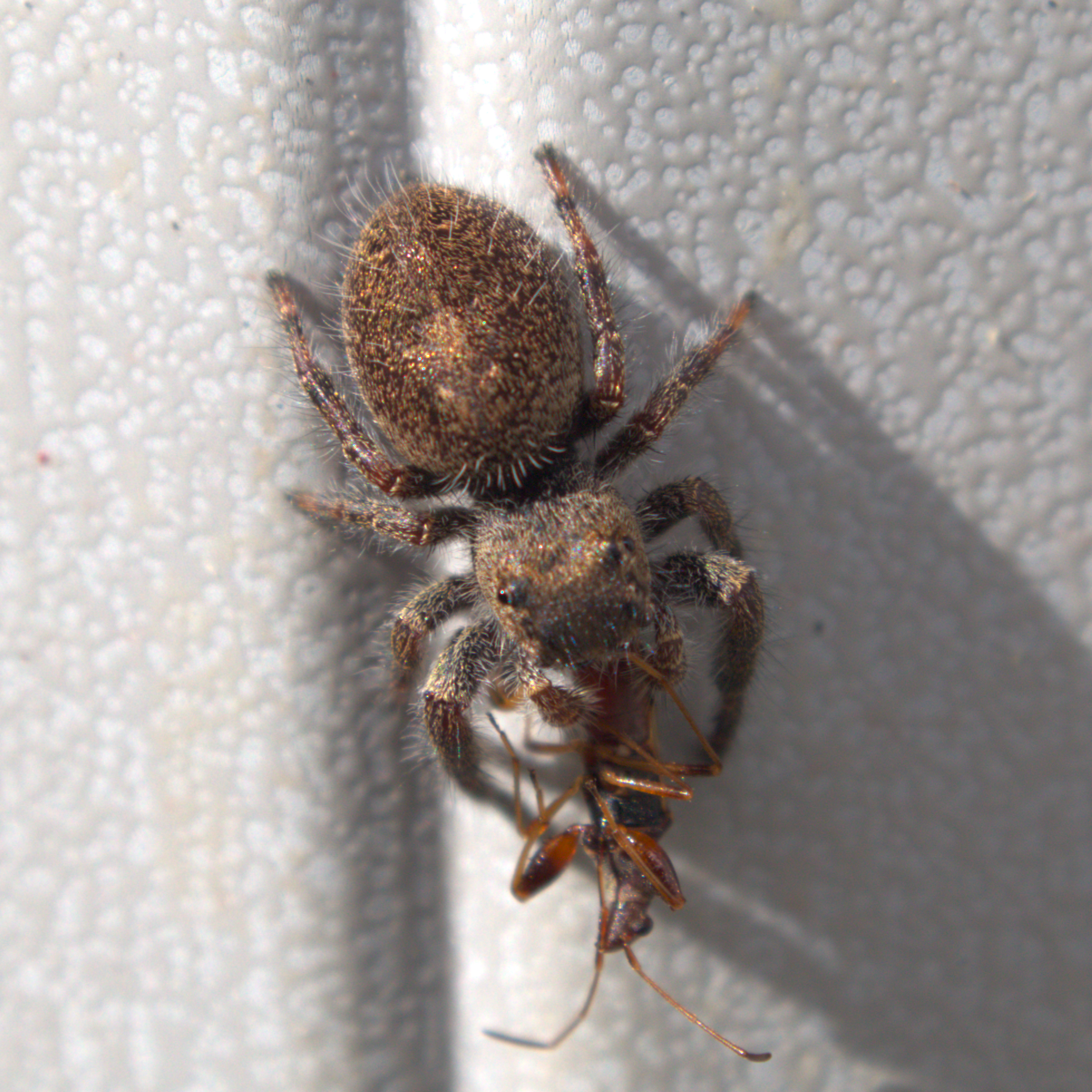
Feeding
