= G. B. Edwards (arachnologist) =

American arachnologist

- Born: Glavis Bernard Edwards Jr. November 24, 1948; Aberdeen, Maryland, U.S.
- Education: University of Maryland (BS); University of Florida (MS, PhD)
- Scientific career
- Workplaces: Florida State Collection of Arthropods

Glavis Bernard Edwards Jr. (born November 24, 1948) is an American taxonomic entomologist specializing primarily in spiders, with broader interests in butterflies, centipedes, millipedes, and thrips. He was the Curator of Arachnida and Myriapoda for the Florida State Collection of Arthropods (FSCA), Division of Plant Industry, Florida Department of Agriculture & Consumer Services. His curatorial responsibilities included Arachnida (except Acari): spiders, scorpions, harvestmen, and relatives; Crustacea (terrestrial species only): pillbugs, sowbugs; Myriapoda including centipedes, millipedes, and symphylans; Onychophora; and Thysanoptera. He has authored more than 100 scientific publications in his fields of research. He retired in August, 2015, after over 38 years of state service. He became a Curator Emeritus at the FSCA and continues his research on jumping spiders.

== Early life ==
Glavis Bernard (G. B.) Edwards Jr. was born in Aberdeen, Maryland on November 24, 1948. In his teen years, he became interested in the behavior of spiders, especially jumping spiders, which were usually victorious when pitted against other spiders of similar size. He graduated from Northwestern High School in Hyattsville, Maryland, where he was well known for his interest in "bugs."

== Education ==
Edwards earned his Bachelor of Science degree in Entomology from the University of Maryland, College Park in 1971. While in undergraduate school, he worked in the Entomology Department as a part-time curator of the arachnid collection developed by Martin H. Muma, which provided him his first opportunity to examine many kinds of identified spiders. He also developed an interest in the use of spiders for biological control.

During his undergraduate years, Edwards learned that a professor doing research on the use of spiders for biological control, Dr. Willard H. Whitcomb, was at the University of Florida. After graduation, he took a graduate assistantship at the university, and completed the Master of Science degree in Entomology (1975) studying the life history of Phidippus regius while working on spiders in soybeans. He later obtained the Doctor of Philosophy degree in Entomology (1980) conducting research on the life history, ecology, mimicry, predatory behavior, courtship behavior, and taxonomy of the jumping spider genus Phidippus.

== Research and professional affiliations ==
Edwards' early research interests focused on the use of spiders as biocontrol agents, and the behavior, biodiversity, biogeography, ecology, and systematics of the spider family Salticidae, the jumping spiders. His later research focused mainly on the systematics of jumping spiders.

His professional activities and affiliations include charter member and membership secretary of the Peckham Society and editor of its publication, Peckhamia; editorial board member of the American Tarantula Society; charter member, Director, and chair of the Committee on Common Names, American Arachnological Society; Secretary and President, Center for Systematic Entomology; and Courtesy Assistant Professor, Department of Entomology and Nematology, University of Florida.
