= Lictor conjugans =

Scientific classification
- Kingdom: Animalia
- Phylum: Arthropoda
- Subphylum: Chelicerata
- Class: Arachnida
- Order: Araneae
- Infraorder: Araneomorphae
- Family: Salticidae
- Genus: Lictor
- Species: L. conjugans

Binomial name
- Lictor conjugans (Szűts & Jocqué, 2001)

Synonyms
- Bacelarella conjugans Szűts & Jocqué, 2001

Species of jumping spider

Lictor conjugans is the type species for the genus Lictor. Originally named Bacelarella conjugans, it is a jumping spider that lives in the rainforests of Ivory Coast. The spider is medium-sized with a brown carapace that is between 3.2 and 4.3 mm (0.13 and 0.17 in) long and an abdomen between 2.9 and 5.1 mm (0.11 and 0.20 in) long. There is a yellow spot just behind the spider's eye field and a lighter mottled pattern on the abdomen. It has white hairs on its clypeus and its spinnerets are pale yellow with a dark streak on them. It has legs that are brown and yellow. Its copulatory organs help differentiate the species from others in the genus. The male has a very short embolus while the female has a large plate and central pit in its epigyne. Internally, its insemination ducts are curved 120 degrees.

== Taxonomy and etymology ==
Lictor conjugans is a species of jumping spider, a member of the family Salticidae, that was first described by the arachnologists Tamás Szűts and Rudy Jocqué in 2001. They allocated it to the genus Bacelarella, which itself had been first circumscribed by Lucien Beland and Jacques Millot in 1941, and gave it the name Bacelarella conjugans. In 2008, the genus had been allocated to a clade named the Bacelarella group based on DNA sequencing. This is a subtribe of the tribe Aelurillini in the subclade Simonida in the clade Saltafresia in the subfamily Salticinae. The genus is named in honour of the Portuguese arachnologist Amélia Vaz Duarte Bacelar. The species is named for the Latin word for 'linking' and relates to the way that the species is intermediate between other related species.

Wanda Wesołowska and Konrad Wiśniewski circumscribed a new genus in 2023 that they termed Lictor after the Roman civil servants that carried a bundle of rods on their shoulders. The rods recall the bristles on the male spider's palpal tibia. They declared Bacelarella tentativa to be the type species for the genus with the name Lictor conjugans. The new genus is a member of the subtribe Thiratoscirtina n the tribe Aelurillini. Bacelarella conjugans was one of five species moved to the genus at the time based on some similarities in the structure of their copulatory organs. The genera are likely to have diverged between 16.3 and 18.7 million years ago.

== Description ==
Lictor conjugans is a medium-sized spider with distinctive features. It measures between 5 and 9 mm (0.20 and 0.35 in) in length. The spider's body is divided into two main parts: a rounded cephalothorax and a thinner more oval abdomen. Males of this species have a light brown carapace, the hard upper part of the cephalothorax, that is between 3.2 and 3.5 mm (0.13 and 0.14 in) in length and between 2.6 and 2.8 mm (0.10 and 0.11 in) in width. It has a yellow spot behind its darker brown eye field, which is marked with a pattern that includes a white triangular shape and a white band. There are white lines along the sides. The underside of the cephalothorax, or sternum, is brown, as are its mouthparts, its chelicerae, labium and maxillae. The spider's face, known as the clypeus, is brown and is covered in white hairs. The presence of these white hairs helps distinguish the spider from the related Lictor pavidus. It has a single tooth.

The male spider's abdomen is between 2.9 and 3.6 mm (0.11 and 0.14 in) long and between 1.8 and 2.6 mm (0.07 and 0.10 in). The topside is dark with a mottled pattern that is interrupted by a pattern of two white spots, two white bands running down from front to back and a reddish scutum. The underside is contrastingly lighter. The spider's spinnerets are pale yellow with a dark streak on them. Its legs are brown with yellow segments. Its copulatory organs are unusual. its palpal bulb is generally covered in white hairs and it has a hairy cymbium. Its tegulum is longer than it is wide and has a short embolus emanating from the top. There is an appendage, known as a lateral apophysis, that is near the bottom of the tegulum. The palpal tibia has a projection, known as its tibial apophysis, that is short with a knob near the base.

The female of the species is larger than the male. It has a carapace that is between 3.4 and 4.3 mm (0.13 and 0.17 in) long and between 2.9 and 3.25 mm (0.11 and 0.13 in) wide. Its carapace is mainly brown with a yellow spot just behind the darker eye field. Its sternum is yellowish-brown and its clypeus ia pale brown. Its chelicerae are dark brown while the remainder of its mouthparts, its labium and maxillae, are lighter.

The female spider has an abdomen that is between 3.5 and 5.1 mm (0.14 and 0.20 in) in length and between 3 and 4 mm (0.12 and 0.16 in) in width. It is generally blackish, darker on top than underneath, with a pale mottled pattern visible on its upper surfaces. The spider has pale yellow spinnerets that have a dark streak and pedipalps that are pale yellow. Its legs are mainly brown with yellow and pale yellow segments. The spider's epigyne, or external copulatory organ, has a large plate, is rounded to the rear and has a central pit. It has short copulatory openings leading via insemination ducts that are curved 120 degrees to large spermathecae, or receptacles, that have thick walls.

== Distribution and habitat ==
Lictor spiders generally live in Africa and are particularly common in the forests of Central and West Africa. Lictor conjugans is endemic to Ivory Coast. The male holotype was found in the rainforests of the Beki Bosse Matie Classified Forest in the southeast of the country in 1995. Other examples of the species were also found nearby. Like other members of the genus, it is more active at times of greater sunlight, typically during the dry season from December to March. It is amongst the least commonly found of all the members of the genus.
