= Lictor tchimbele =

Scientific classification
- Kingdom: Animalia
- Phylum: Arthropoda
- Subphylum: Chelicerata
- Class: Arachnida
- Order: Araneae
- Infraorder: Araneomorphae
- Family: Salticidae
- Genus: Lictor
- Species: L. tchimbele

Binomial name
- Lictor tchimbele Wesołowska & Wiśniewski, 2023

Species of jumping spider

Lictor tchimbele is a species of jumping spider in the genus Lictor that lives in Gabon. First described in 2023, it is a medium-sized that has a front section, or cephalothorax, that has a length between 2.5 and 3.2 mm (0.10 and 0.13 in) and, behind this, an abdomen that is between 1.8 and 2.2 mm (0.07 and 0.09 in) in length. Its cephalothorax is generally light brown, although its sides are darker. Its abdomen is creamy apart from a darker spots on its sides and a black area at the very back of the spider. Its spinnerets are also generally creamy. The male's copulatory organs are similar to the related Lictor mirabilis but differ in the shape of the protrusion on its palpal tibia, known as its tibial apophysis. This is wider than it is long and has a rounded notch at its tip. The female has not yet been described.

== Taxonomy and etymology ==
Lictor tchimbele is a species of jumping spider, a member of the family Salticidae, that was first described by the arachnologists Wanda Wesołowska and Konrad Wiśniewski in 2023. It was one of over 500 species identified by Wesołowska during her career. They allocated the spider to the genus Lictor, which they circumscribed at the same time. It is the first newly described species to be allocated to the genus. The genus is named after the Roman civil servants that carried a bundle of rods on their shoulders. The rods recall the bristles on the male spider's palpal tibia. The species is named for the place where it was first found.

The genus is a member of the subtribe Thiratoscirtina in the tribe Aelurillini. Wayne Maddison allocated the tribe to the subclade Simonida in the clade Saltafresia, which is itself part of Salticoida. In 2012, Mellissa Bodner and Maddison proposed the subfamily Thiratoscirtinae for the genus and its related genera. This overlapped with a group of genera named Thiratoscirtines after the genus, created by Jerzy Prószyński in 2017. Phylogenetic analysis has shown that the genus is related to the genera Alfenus, Bacelarella, Longarenus and Malloneta. It is likely to have diverged from them between 16.3 and 18.7 million years ago. The holotype is stored in the Beaty Biodiversity Museum in Vancouver.

== Description ==
Lictor tchimbele is a medium-sized spider with unique physical features. The spider's body is divided into two main parts: the cephalothorax, which is a wide ovoid, and the abdomen, which is shorter and thinner. Males of this species have a cephalothorax measuring between 2.5 and 3.2 mm (0.10 and 0.13 in) in length and 2.3 and 2.5 mm (0.09 and 0.10 in) in width. Its carapace, the hard upper part of the cephalothorax, is a broad oval that has a groove-like depression, or fovea. Although it is generally light brown, and covered in brown hairs, the carapace has darker sides. There are black rings and faint hairs around its eyes, which sit within a yellowish eye field. The part of the spider's face known as the clypeus is low and yellow. The underside of the cephalothorax, or sternum, is light brown. It has a single tooth in its chelicerae.

The male spider's abdomen is a narrow ovoid that measures between 1.8 and 2.2 mm (0.07 and 0.09 in) in length and 1.2 and 1.3 mm (0.05 and 0.05 in) in width. It is mainly creamy except at the very back, which is black, and the presence of brown spots on its sides. The spider's spinnerets are also creamy although there is a black patch at their base and the rearmost spinnerets have a black line on them. The spider's legs are yellow with fine brown leg hairs and brown spines.

The spider has similar copulatory organs to the related Lictor mirabilis. The male's pedipalps, sensory organs near the mouth, are yellow and covered in short light brown hairs. They end in a short tibia, which has a characteristic long tuft of brown bristles. It has an unusually shaped protrusion known as a tibial apophysis that is wider than it is long and has a rounded notch at its tip. This shape clearly distinguishes the species from other spiders in the genus. It has a hairy cymbium that encases the oval palpal bulb. The bulb has a bulge on the side and a bump at the base of its very short embolus. The female has not been described.

== Distribution and habitat ==
Lictor spiders generally live in Africa and are particularly common in the forests of Central and West Africa. Lictor tchimbele is endemic to Gabon. The male holotype was found in the Crystal Mountains.
