= Lictor tentativus =

Scientific classification
- Kingdom: Animalia
- Phylum: Arthropoda
- Subphylum: Chelicerata
- Class: Arachnida
- Order: Araneae
- Infraorder: Araneomorphae
- Family: Salticidae
- Genus: Lictor
- Species: L. tentativus

Binomial name
- Lictor tentativus (Szűts & Jocqué, 2001)

Synonyms
- Bacelarella tentativa Szűts & Jocqué, 2001; Thiratoscirtus tentativus Wesołowska & Russell-Smith, 2022

Species of jumping spider

Lictor tentativus is the type species for the genus Lictor. Originally named Bacelarella tentativa, it is a jumping spider that lives in the rainforests of Ivory Coast. Its specific name, which can be translated "questionable" recalls the way that its status in that genus was doubted from the start. The spider is medium-sized 5 and 9 mm (0.20 and 0.35 in) in length. The female and male are similar in size. The spider has a generally brown carapace, the male lighter with a light brown spot visible behind its eye field while the female has a yellow spot in the spider's fovea. Its sternum is also brown, as is its clypeus. While the male's mottled abdomen is brown, the female is greyish-yellow. Its copulatory organs help differentiate the species from others in the genus. The male has a very short embolus while the female has a nearly-invisible epigyne hidden beneath an integument.

== Taxonomy and etymology ==
Lictor tentativus is a species of jumping spider, a member of the family Salticidae, that was first described by the arachnologists Tamás Szűts and Rudy Jocqué in 2001. They allocated it to the genus Bacelarella, which itself had been first circumscribed by Lucien Beland and Jacques Millot in 1941, and gave it the name Bacelarella tentativa. The genus is named in honour of the Portuguese arachnologist Amélia Vaz Duarte Bacelar. The species is named for the Latin word for 'questionable' and relates to the tentative way that the authors allocated the species to the genus.

In 2008, the genus had been allocated to a clade named the Bacelarella group based on DNA sequencing. This is a subtribe of the tribe Aelurillini in the subclade Simonida in the clade Saltafresia in the subfamily Salticinae. In 2022, arachnologists Wanda Wesołowska and Anthony Russell-Smith moved the species to the genus Thiratoscirtus with the name Thiratoscirtus tentativus on the basis of its similarity with Thiratoscirtus gambari and Thiratoscirtus silvistris. The genus had been first circumscribed in 1909 by Eugène Simon. It is a member of the subtribe Thiratoscirtina in the tribe Aelurillini.

Wesołowska and Konrad Wiśniewski circumscribed a new genus in 2023 that they termed Lictor after the Roman civil servants that carried a bundle of rods on their shoulders. The rods recall the bristles on the male spider's palpal tibia. They declared Bacelarella tentativa to be the type species for the genus with the name Lictor tentativus. The new genus is a member of the same subtribe as Thiratoscirtus. Thiratoscirtus tentativus was one of five species moved to the genus at the time based on some similarities in the structure of their copulatory organs. The genera are likely to have diverged between 16.3 and 18.7 million years ago.

== Description ==
Lictor tentativus is a medium-sized spider with distinctive features. They measure between 5 and 9 mm (0.20 and 0.35 in) in length. The spider's body is divided into two main parts: a cephalothorax and a larger and more rounded abdomen. Males of this species have a light brown carapace, the hard upper part of the cephalothorax, that is typically 3.2 mm (0.13 in) in length and 2.8 mm (0.11 in) in width. It has a light brown spot behind its darker brown eye field. The underside of the cephalothorax, or sternum, is brown, as are its mouthparts, its chelicerae, labium and maxillae. The spider's face, known as the clypeus, have a row of white hairs but otherwise are also brown. It has a single tooth.

The male spider's abdomen is typically 3.1 mm (0.12 in) long and 1.9 mm (0.07 in) wide. The upperside is brown with a mottled pattern and a few white spots visible on the surface. The underside is contrastingly lighter. The spider's spinnerets are pale yellow with a dark streak on them. Its legs are brown with yellow segments. Its copulatory organs are unusual. its palpal bulb is generally covered in white hairs and it has a hairy cymbium that encases the palpal bulb and has a groove for the very short embolus. Its tegulum is longer than it is wide. The palpal tibia has a projection, known as its tibial apophysis, that is short and stumpy.

The female of the species is similar in size than the male. It has a cephalothorax typically 2.8 mm long and 2.1 mm (0.08 in) wide. Its carapace is mainly brown and covered in brown hairs. There is a yellow area to the back and a yellow spot in the spider's fovea. There are faint colourless hairs on the eye field. The sternum is light brown as are the spider's mouthparts.

The female spider has an abdomen that is typically 3 mm (0.12 in) long and 2 mm (0.08 in) wide. It is generally greyish-yellow, darker on top than underneath, with a pale mottled pattern visible on its upper surfaces. The spider has pale yellow spinnerets that lack the dark markings of the male. Its legs are mainly brown with a small number of light rings. The spider's epigyne, or external copulatory organ, shows small signs of sclerotization and is barely visible as it is mainly hidden beneath an integument. The two copulatory openings lead via short insemination ducts to large spermathecae, or receptacles.

== Distribution and habitat ==
Lictor spiders generally live in Africa and are particularly common in the forests of Central and West Africa. Lictor tentativus is endemic to Ivory Coast. The male holotype was found in the rainforest of Beki Bosse Matie Classified Forest in southeastern Ivory Coast in 1995. Other examples of the species were also found nearby. The first female was seen in the Bandama Forest living on the branches of trees. Like other members of the genus, it is more active at times of greater sunlight, typically during the dry season from December to March. It is amongst the least commonly found of all the members of the genus.
