= History of coins in Romania =

The history of coins in the area that is now Romania spans over a 2500-year period; coins were first introduced in significant numbers to this area by the Greeks, through their colonies on the Black Sea shore.

== Ancient coins ==
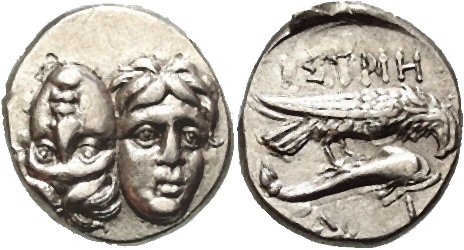
Histria minted coins

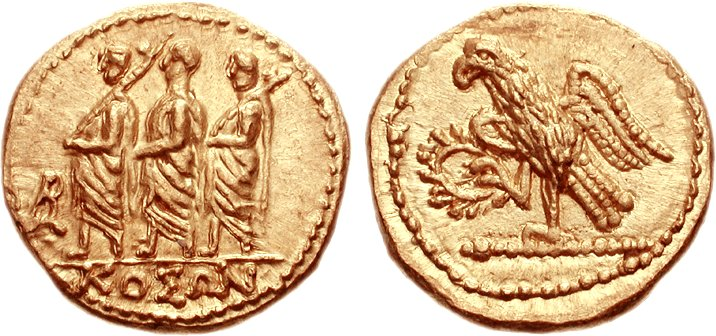
The golden denarius minted by Coson.

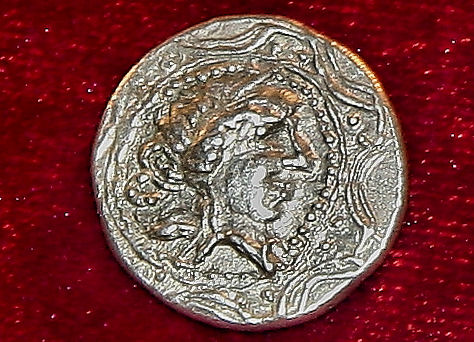
Silver Koson found at Dealu Budii, Arges county, Romania

The earliest documented currency in the Romanian territory was an 8-gram silver drachma, issued by the Greek polis (πολις, city) Histria (in the region that is now the Dobruja) in the year 480 BC. It was followed by other coins issued by other Greek poleis in Dobruja. In the 4th century BC, the coins of Macedonian kings Philip II and Alexander the Great were used in Dacia, but also indigenous coins including the celebrated gold kosoni (named so after the Dacian King depicted on most of the coins, Koson or Coson). In the 3rd century BC or 2nd century BC, Dacian minting increased in intensity. In parallel with the local coins in Dacia, coins from Macedonia Prima, Thasos, Apollonia and Dyrrachium also circulated. Similarly, Roman coins such as Republican and Imperial denarii also circulated in the Dacian territory, even before the Roman occupation, much as they continued to circulate even after the Aurelian retreat, later replaced by Byzantine money.

== Middle Ages ==
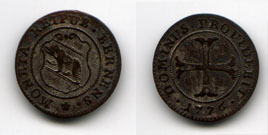
Kreuzer (Romanian: Crăiţari)

Soon after their founding, the principalities of Wallachia and Moldavia each minted their own silver coins. Wallachia minted their first coins during the rule of Vlaicu Vodă (1364–1377) and Moldavia during the rule of Petru I (1375–1391).

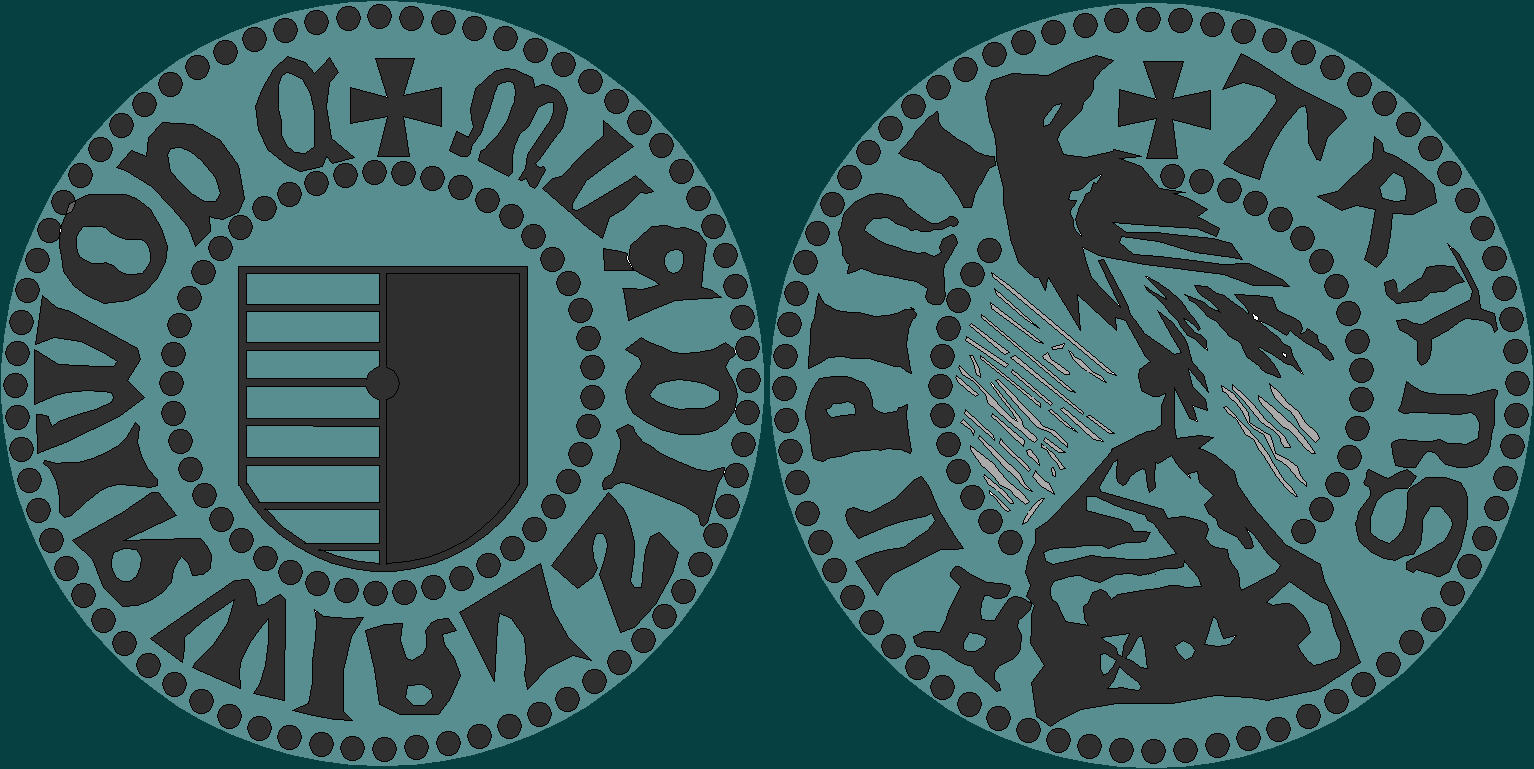
Vlaicu Vodă ducat with Latin inscriptions

In Moldavia, coins used the size and weight of the Grosh, while Wallachia minted both Grosh and Hungarian Denarii. In both countries, early coins had alternately Latin and Cyrillic inscriptions. Early Wallachian coins bear the coat of arms of the Basarab dynasty and have written with Latin script Transalpina (an alternative name of Wallachia).

The minting of silver coins being known as aspri, a name derived from Greek áspron, increased in the first half of the 15th century, but then ceased completely in Wallachia during the rule of Vladislav II (1447–1456) and in Moldavia during the rule of Ștefăniță Vodă (1517–1527). Apparently, a major reason in this was the lack of a steady supply of silver (neither Wallachia nor Moldavia have their own silver resources), as well as increasing trade, which brought coins that replaced the local ones. The only city that continued to mint coins was Cetatea Albă, in Moldavia.

In contracts and other documents, the numbers written were not actual numbers of the coins, but their value in a standard system: for example, the standard often used the gold system, but the payments were done with the local silver coins.

The earliest standard in Wallachia was the perper, derived from the Byzantine gold coin hipérpyron, which was replaced in the 15th-century Italian system of the ducat and the florin.

In Moldavia, the Lithuanian Grosh was replaced with the Zlot Tătăresc (Tatar Zlot), which, despite its name, was not minted by the Tatars, but it was a coin minted in the Genoese colony of Caffa.

Many different coins circulated in the Romanian lands over the course of centuries: Turkish thalers, Hungarian and Austrian guilders (known in Romania as galbeni), zloti, Russian carboave, Venerian zecchini, over 100 currencies in all.

Toward the end of the 16th century, a new coin began to be used in Wallachia and Moldavia, as well as in other parts of the Ottoman Empire: the Dutch Daalder. These coins bear a lion on them (hence Dutch leeuwendaalder, German löwenthaler) and the name of the coin became abbreviated known as leu (plural lei), which is still the name of the Romanian and Moldovan currencies. The Ottomans minted coins imitating the Dutch silver daalders and these coins were known as piaștri, Piastre.

== Modern times ==
Through the Organic Regulations adopted in 1831 in Wallachia and in 1832 in Moldova stabilized the coinage used in the Romanian Lands: the Austrian florin and a silver coin known to numismatists as the Zwainziger from Zwanziger, "twentieth", the Tyrolian kreuzer, worth 20 Veronese denarii (in German Berner, in Latin denarii cruciati, cruciati meaning "crossed", from the cross on the coin).

As a recognition of unification, prince Alexandru Ioan Cuza wanted to mint a coin, to be called români or romanat following Ion Heliade Rădulescu. This proved impossible, given the amount of metal in the possession of his state and the power of the Ottomans, who did not accept that their vassal state should have its own currency.
