= Therapontigonus =

Therapontigonus may refer to:

- a character in the play Curculio, a Latin comedic play for the early Roman theatre by Titus Maccius Plautus
- Therapontigonus (weevil), a beetle genus in the tribe Peritelini
