= Rainbow in Latin literature =

Topic in ancient Latin literature

The rainbow features in Latin literature in a variety of contexts and genres. Accounts survive from as early as the 2nd century BCE all the way through the 5th century CE. Its usage and meanings differs greatly.

== Scientific understanding ==
The Romans are the second oldest civilization of which written sources are transmitted of scientific approaches to explain the rainbow as a natural phenomenon. Greek authors like Aristotle and Alexander of Aphrodisias had already theorized the rainbow to be some sort of reflection of sunlight.

Seneca theorizes the rainbow to be a reflection of light through the clouds: a game of light and shadow. Pliny the Elder gives a similar account, adding that it should not be seen as something supernatural.

Though mostly referred to as "multicolored", some authors mention a specific number of colors in the rainbow. Ammianus Marcellinus mentions five colors (yellow, gold/tawny, red, violet and greenish blue), Seneca names four (blue, green, purple and orange-red) and Virgil, Propertius and Claudian pick out just a single color.

== Usage and Portrayal ==
=== Sign of Rain ===
The earliest traceable Latin text that features the rainbow is the Curculio by Plautus. In this play the rainbow gets an active role in the description arcus bibit ("the drinking bow"): the rainbow is imagined to be drinking the Earth's water and bringing about heavy, destructive rain. This earliest imagery is also its most common appearance in Latin literature, featuring among others in the works of Virgil, Propertius, Statius, Lucan, Valerius Flaccus and Vitruvius.

Alongside its causal role in producing heavy rainfall, it is also commonly an omen of rainfall to come, the imbrifer arcus ("the rainbringing bow") is mentioned by different authors, like Tibullus and Seneca.

=== Rainbow Goddess ===
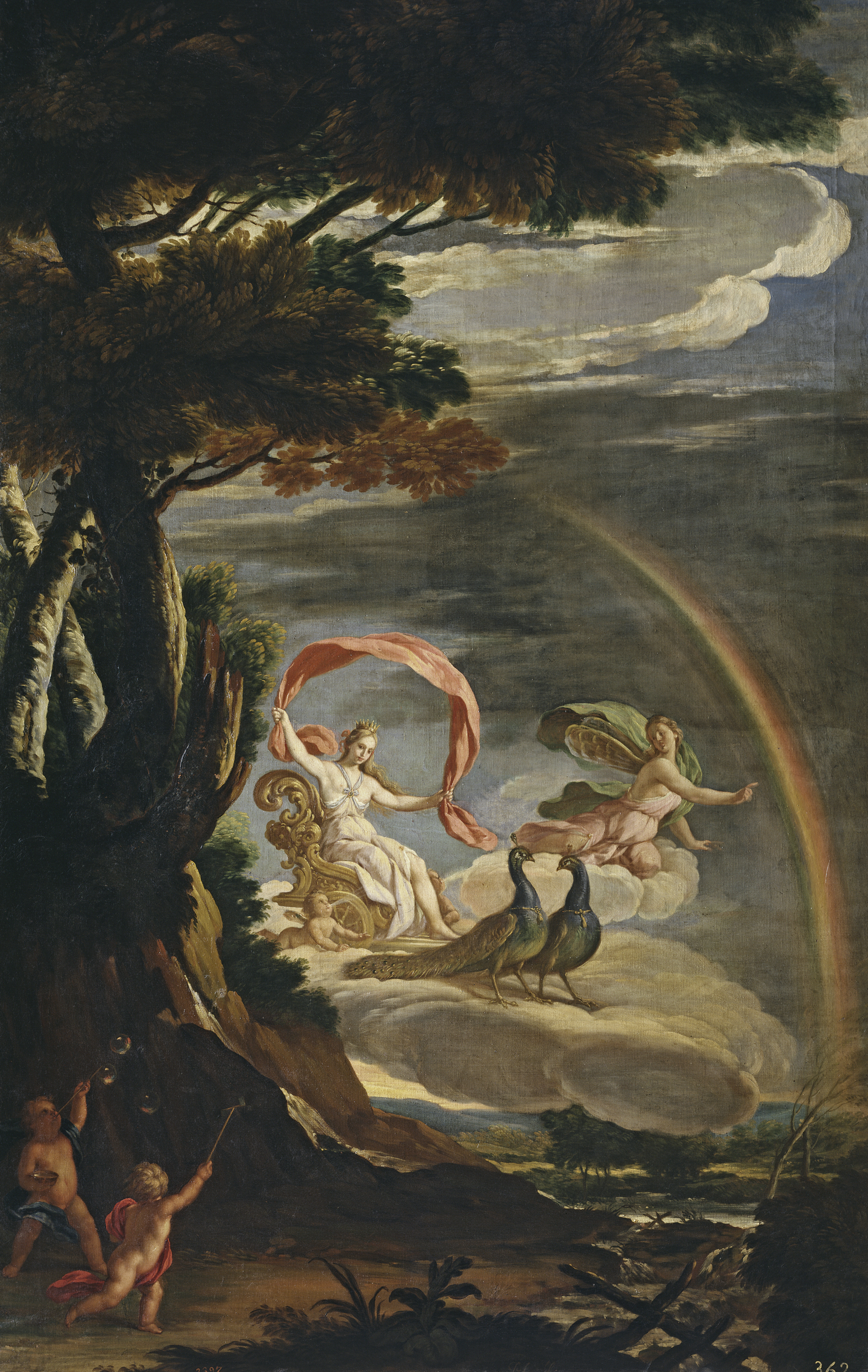
Iris accompanying Juno as her messenger along with a rainbow. 18th century painting by Antonio Palomino.

The Romans took over the Greek goddess Iris as the deification of the rainbow. In Greek literature she is portrayed as a personification of the rainbow itself. On the contrary, Roman authors portray Iris as a goddess connected to the rainbow. She both creates it and uses it as a mean of travel.

Iris generally acts as the messenger of Juno, similar to Mercury being Jupiter's messenger. Iris shows up in the Aeneid and the Metamorphoses. In both epics, Iris is generally present as an ill omen, similarly to how she appears in the Greek Homeric epics. In both the Aeneid and Metamorphoses she repeatedly tries to harm or kill the protagonists and in the deluge story in the Metamorphoses she worsens the flood by sucking up water from the ground to add to the rain. Sporadically, the presence of Iris has a positive effect, for example in freeing Dido's struggling soul from her body after her death or reuniting Hersilia with her deceased husband Romulus and turning them both into stars.

=== Different signs and powers ===
Besides its repeated use as an omen of bad weather, Livy and Seneca name the rainbow as a general pest among other pests and a sign through which the gods display their anger.

The rainbow occasionally announces positive change. In the Argonautica by Valerius Flaccus, the rainbow appears as a sign of improving weather and improving times.

Several historiographers tell the story of a young Augustus returning from Apollonia. They relay that a rainbow appeared from a clear sky, either around the sun or Augustus' head, as a sign of his future power.

Ammianus Marcellinus considers the rainbow to be a neutral sign that announces change. Both change in weather, from good to bad or bad to good, and a change in a story, which again can be a change in a good or bad direction.

Pliny the Elder considered a double rainbow to be an ambiguous sign, theorizing that it announces either an upcoming rainstorm, or good weather after rain.

=== Natural actor ===
Besides the repeated mention of producing rain, Pliny believes that a beehive that is touched by a rainbow would produce medicine instead of honey. He also states that the rainbow gives scent to flowers. This belief is possibly derived from Aristotle.
