= Zlot =

Zlot can refer to

- Polish złoty, current Polish currency
- Zlot (currency), medieval currency in Eastern Europe
- Zlot (Bor), a town in eastern Serbia
