= Lictor (spider) =

Scientific classification
- Kingdom: Animalia
- Phylum: Arthropoda
- Subphylum: Chelicerata
- Class: Arachnida
- Order: Araneae
- Infraorder: Araneomorphae
- Family: Salticidae
- Subfamily: Salticinae
- Genus: Lictor; Wesołowska & Wiśniewski, 2023

Type species
- L. tentativus (Szűts & Jocqué, 2001)

Species
- 7, see text

Genus of spiders

Lictor is a genus of jumping spiders that was first circumscribed by Wesołowska and Konrad Wiśniewski in 2023. Found in the forests of Central and West Africa, including on the Nimba Range between Guinea and Ivory Coast, the genus is amongst the most frequently identified amongst the members of the subtribe Thiratoscirtina. It is medium-sized, with a body length between 5 and 9 mm (0.20 and 0.35 in). They have a groove-like depression, or fovea, on the surface of their upper parts and dark rings around their eyes, the forward line of which are more spaced that the others. They are most easily distinguished, however, by their copulatory organs. All the males in the genus have a distinctive tuft of long bristles on their palpal tibia; this feature is the source of the generic name as they recall the bundle of rods that were carried by Roman civil servants called lictor. The tibia also have a short and very wide spike known as a tibial apophysis. The females have copulatory openings towards the front of their epigynes, the visible external part of the females' copulatory organs that are covered with hood-like features.

== Taxonomy and etymology ==
=== History ===
Lictor is a genus of jumping spiders, a member of the family Salticidae, that was circumscribed by the Polish arachnologists Wanda Wesołowska and Konrad Wiśniewski in 2023. They named the genus after the Roman civil servants that carried a bundle of rods on their shoulders. The rods recall the bristles on the male spider's palpal tibia.

The genus is a member of the subtribe Thiratoscirtina in the tribe Aelurillini. First circumscribed by the evolutionary biologist Wayne Maddison in 2015, Thiratoscirtina is endemic to Africa and is one of the most diverse of all the salticid lines and are known for their distinctive leg spines and complex mating structures. In 2015, Maddison allocated the tribe to the subclade Simonida in the clade Saltafresia, which is itself part of Salticoida. This overlapped with a group of genera named Thiratoscirtines after the genus, created by the arachnologist Jerzy Prószyński in 2017.

=== Membership ===
Wesołowska and Wiśniewski declared Bacelarella tentativa to be the type species for the genus with the name Lictor tentativus. The species had first been described with the name Bacelarella tentativa by arachnologists Tamás Szűts and Rudy Jocqué in 2001. They had allocated it to the genus Bacelarella, which itself had been first circumscribed by French arachnologists Lucien Berland and Jacques Millot in 1941. The genus is named in honour of the Portuguese arachnologist Amélia Bacelar.

In 2023, the scientists also moved four other species to the genus based on some similarities in the structure of their copulatory organs. Four were from the genus Thiratoscirtus, which is also a member of the subtribe Thiratoscirtina. Phylogenetic analysis has shown that the genus is related to the genera Alfenus, Bacelarella, Longarenus and Malloneta. It is likely to have diverged from them between 16.3 and 18.7 million years ago. Lictor tchimbele is the first newly described species to be allocated to the genus.

== Description ==
Lictor are medium-sized spiders that have a body length between 5 and 9 mm (0.20 and 0.35 in). They have a body is divided into two main parts: a forward part known as a cephalothorax, which is a wide ovoid, and, behind that, a smaller abdomen. Their carapace, the hard upper part of the cephalothorax, is a broad oval that is moderately high and has a groove-like depression, or fovea on its surface. They have an eye field that is darker than the remainder of their carapace. There are dark rings around the spiders' eyes, the forward line of which are more spaced that the others. The part of the spider's face known as the clypeus is low and there is a single tooth in their chelicerae. The spiders' abdomen are generally ovoid and, particularly in the case of the males, thinner than the carapace.

The species is easiest to define by its copulatory organs. The males have a short tibia in their pedipalps, sensory organs near the mouth that is fatter at their further end, which also ends with a tuft made up of long bristles. They have a short and very wide spike known as a tibial apophysis. Attached to the tibias are oval cymbiums and palpal bulbs, the cymbiums being longer and thinner, although, compared to other Thiratoscirtines, these are not as comparatively long as other spiders.

Like other members of the tribe, the females have spiny pedipalps. Their epigynes, the visible external part of the females' copulatory organs, are simple with copulatory openings found towards the front and covered with hood-like features. These openings lead via short, thin insemination ducts to small spermathecae, or receptacles.

== Species ==
As of August 2024 the genus contains seven species, found only in Africa:

- Lictor conjugans (Szűts & Jocqué, 2001) – Ivory Coast
- Lictor mirabilis (Wesołowska & Russell-Smith, 2011) – Nigeria
- Lictor newene Wesołowska & Henrard, 2025 – Guinea, Ivory Coast
- Lictor pavidus (Szűts & Jocqué, 2001) – Guinea, Ivory Coast, Nigeria
- Lictor perspicuus (Wiśniewski & Wesołowska, 2013) – Guinea, Ivory Coast, Democratic Republic of the Congo
- Lictor tchimbele Wiśniewski & Wesołowska, 2023 – Gabon
- Lictor tentativus (Szűts & Jocqué, 2001) – Ivory Coast (type species)

== Distribution ==
Lictor spiders generally live in Africa and are particularly common in the forests of Central and West Africa. The genus is one of the most common amongst the Thiratoscirtines to be found on the Nimba Range between Guinea and Ivory Coast. They are more active at times of greater sunlight, typically during the dry season from December to March.
