= Lictor pavidus =

Scientific classification
- Kingdom: Animalia
- Phylum: Arthropoda
- Subphylum: Chelicerata
- Class: Arachnida
- Order: Araneae
- Infraorder: Araneomorphae
- Family: Salticidae
- Genus: Lictor
- Species: L. pavidus

Binomial name
- Lictor pavidus (Szűts & Jocqué 2001)

Synonyms
- Bacelarella pavidus(Szűts & Jocqué 2001

Species of jumping spider

Lictor pavidus is a species of jumping spider in the genus Lictor that lives in the forests of Ivory Coast and Nigeria. It has been found living in trees living near rivers and streams. The species was first described in 2001 by the Tamás Szűts and Rudy Jocqué. Initially allocated to the genus Bacelarella, the species was moved to its current genus in 2023 by Wanda Wesołowska and Konrad Wiśniewski. The spider is medium-sized, with an cephalothorax that is between 3.7 and 4 mm (0.15 and 0.16 in) long and an abdomen that is between 2 and 4.5 mm (0.08 and 0.18 in) long. It has a yellow spot on its carapace behind its eye field. It can be distinguished from other species in the genus by its unusual copulatory organs. The male has simple pedipalps with a thin, short embolus that fits in a groove in its hairy cymbium. The female has a plate to the rear of its epigyne. The simplicity of the male copulatory organs is recalled in its species name, which is a Latin word that can be translated as "shy".

== Taxonomy and etymology ==
Lictor pavidus is a species of jumping spider, a member of the family Salticidae, that was first described by the arachnologists Tamás Szűts and Rudy Jocqué in 2001. They allocated it to the genus Bacelarella, which itself had been first circumscribed by Lucien Beland and Jacques Millot in 1941, and gave it the name Bacelarella pavida. The genus is named in honour of the Portuguese arachnologist Amélia Vaz Duarte Bacelar. The species is named for the Latin word for 'shy' and relates to the simplicity of the design of the male pedipalps. In 2008, the genus was allocated to a clade named the Bacelarella group based on DNA sequencing. It is a subtribe of the tribe Aelurillini in the subclade Simonida in the clade Saltafresia in the subfamily Salticinae.

In 2023, arachnologists Wanda Wesołowska and Konrad Wiśniewski circumscribed a new genus that they termed Lictor, after the Roman civil servants that carried a bundle of rods on their shoulders. The rods recall the bristles on the male spider's palpal tibia. The new genus is a member of the subtribe Thiratoscirtina in the tribe Aelurillini. Bacelarella pavidus was one of five species moved to the genus at the time based on some similarities in the structure of their copulatory organs. They also recognised that female specimen of the spider Thiratoscirtus gambari that had been described in 2011 and 2022 were wrongly identified and were in fact the female for this species. The genus Thiratoscirtus had been first circumscribed in 1909 by Eugène Simon. It is a member of the same subtribe. The genera are likely to have diverged between 16.3 and 18.7 million years ago.

== Description ==
Lictor pavidus is a medium-sized spider with distinctive copulatory organs. They measure between 5 and 9 mm (0.20 and 0.35 in) in length. The spider's body is divided into two main parts: a cephalothorax and a larger and more rounded abdomen. Males of this species have a cephalothorax measuring between 3.7 and 4 mm (0.15 and 0.16 in) in length and 2.8 and 2.9 mm (0.11 and 0.11 in) in width. The carapace, the hard upper part of the cephalothorax, is brown with a shiny yellow spot behind the dark brown eye field, which itself is marked with a pattern of a band and triangle made of white hairs. It has white sides. The spider's face, known as the clypeus is dark brown. The underside of the cephalothorax, or sternum, is light brown. It has dark brown chelicerae, while its labium and maxillae are light brown. Its other mouthparts are lighter brown.

The male spider's abdomen is a narrow ovoid that measures between 3 and 4.5 mm (0.12 and 0.18 in) in length and 1.5 and 3.1 mm (0.06 and 0.12 in) in width. The upperside is blackish with a mottled pattern visible on the surface. It has a red scutum at the front, and two white bands and two white spots in the middle. The underside is contrastingly lighter. The spider's spinnerets are pale yellow with dark streaks on them. Its legs are brown with yellow segments. The palpal bulb is generally covered in white hairs, It has a hairy cymbium that encases the palpal bulb and has a groove for the embolus. Its tegulum is longer than it is wide and is attached to the embolus at the front. The embolus itself is short, thin and points downwards. The palpal tibia has a projection, known as its tibial apophysis, that is short and rounded with a groove at its end.

The female spider is similar in size to the male. It has a cephalothorax between 3.9 mm (0.15 in) and 4 mm long and 2.9 and 3 mm (0.12 in) wide. The carapace is similarly brown with a yellow spot behind the darker eye field while the sternum is yellowish-brown. Its clypeus is pale brown. It has dark brown chelicerae. There is a single tooth visible. Like the male, the other mouthparts, the labium and maxillae, are lighter brown. Its abdomen is between 3 and 5.1 mm (0.20 in) in length and 2 mm (0.08 in) and 3 mm in width

The upperside of the female abdomen is lighter than the male, greyish, but has a similar mottling and pattern of wide bands and spots. The underside is similarly lighter than the top. Its legs and pedipalps are generally yellow with darker patches on some of the legs. The female's copulatory organs are also unusual. The spider's epigyne, or external copulatory organ, has a large plate towards the rear, along with an indentation in the middle. The two copulatory openings lead via short insemination ducts to large spermathecae, or receptacles, that have thick walls and an extension to the sides.

== Distribution and habitat ==
Lictor spiders generally live in Africa and are particularly common in the forests of Central and West Africa. Lictor pavidus lives in Ivory Coast and Nigeria. The male holotype was found in the Beki Bosse Matie Classified Forest in southeastern Ivory Coast in 1995. Other examples of the species were also found nearby. The species was first seen in Nigeria living in Gambari Forest Reserve south of Ibadan in 1974 but it was identified more than twenty years later. Some examples were found near streams or rivers. Others live in fallow bush. Some of those identified in the Bandama Forest in Ivory Coast were found living on the branches of trees. It is less commonly found than related spiders with more complex copulatory organs.
