= Coinage of Aegina =

Coins made on Aegina, 6th century BC

Silver staters of Aegina

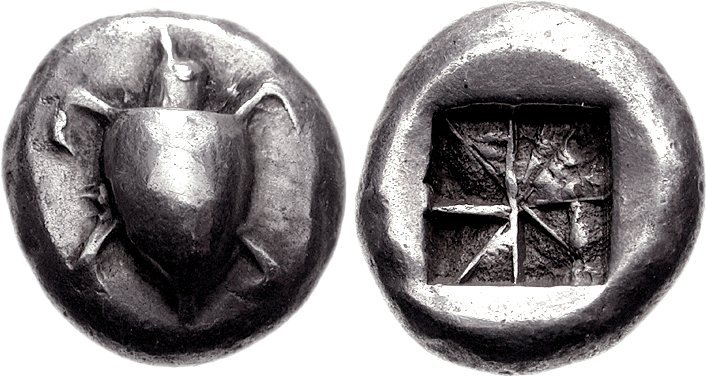
Silver stater of Aegina, 550–530 BC. Obv. Sea turtle with large pellets down center. Rev. incuse square with eight sections. After the end of the Peloponnesian War, 404 BC, Sea turtle was replaced by the land tortoise.

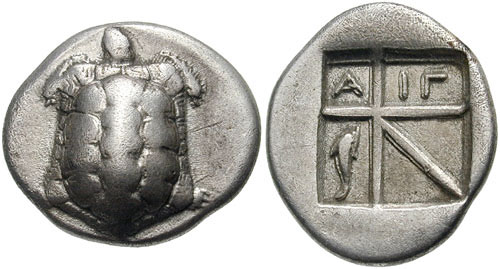
Silver drachma of Aegina, 404–340 BC. Obverse: Land tortoise. Reverse: inscription ΑΙΓ[ΙΝΑΤΟΝ] ([of the] Aeg[inetans]) "Aegina" and dolphin.

The Coinage of Aegina began in the 6th century BC. The front has a sea turtle design, while the back has a punch mark, found on most coins at that time. The earliest coins were made of electrum, a mix of gold and silver. The coins were first made on the island of Aegina, off the southeast side of Greece.

Yale Professor and Historian Donald Kagan sustains that the Argive king Pheidon was "the first man to strike silver coins on the island of Aegina" in the 7th century, however this has been contested by most experts in the field and so far unconfirmed by archeological evidence.

The coins with 'turtle' design are considered "an important early trading currency".

== See also ==
- Stater
