= Stater =

Ancient Greek coin

Silver staters

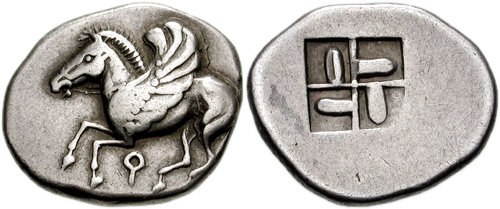
An early Archaic silver stater from Corinth, 555–515 BC. Obverse: Pegasus flying left, koppa below. Reverse: quadripartite incuse

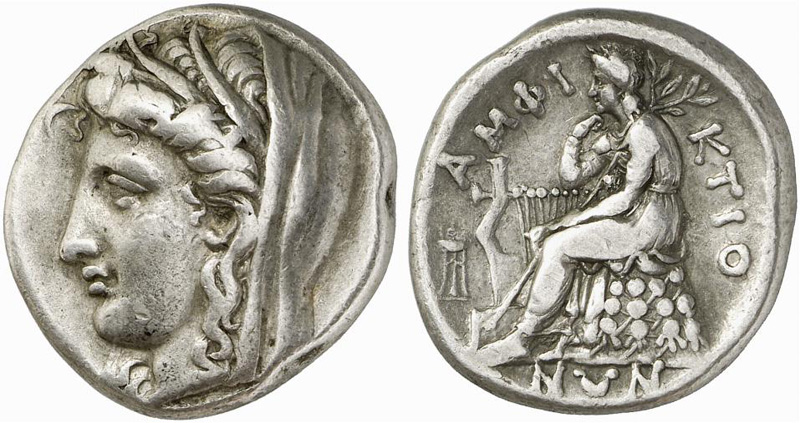
Silver stater from Delphi, 338/6–334/3 BC. Obverse: head of Demeter left, wearing grain-ear wreath and veil. Reverse: Apollo seated left on omphalos, tripod to left, ΑΜΦΙΚΤΙΟΝΩΝ around.

The stater (/ˈsteɪtər, stɑːˈtɛər/; Ancient Greek: στατήρ, pronounced [statɛ̌ːr], romanized: statḗr, lit. 'weight') was an ancient coin used in various regions of Greece. The term is also used for similar coins, imitating Greek staters, minted elsewhere in ancient Europe.

== History ==
The stater, as a Greek silver currency, first as ingots, and later as coins, circulated from the 8th century BC to AD 50. The earliest known stamped stater (having the mark of some authority in the form of a picture or words) is an electrum turtle coin, struck at Aegina that dates to about 650 BC. It is on display at the Bibliothèque Nationale in Paris. According to Robin Lane Fox, the stater as a weight unit was borrowed by the Euboean stater weighing 8.7–8.8 grams (0.28–0.28 ozt) from the Phoenician shekel, which had about the same weight as a stater (8.3 g, 0.27 ozt) and was also one fiftieth of a mina.

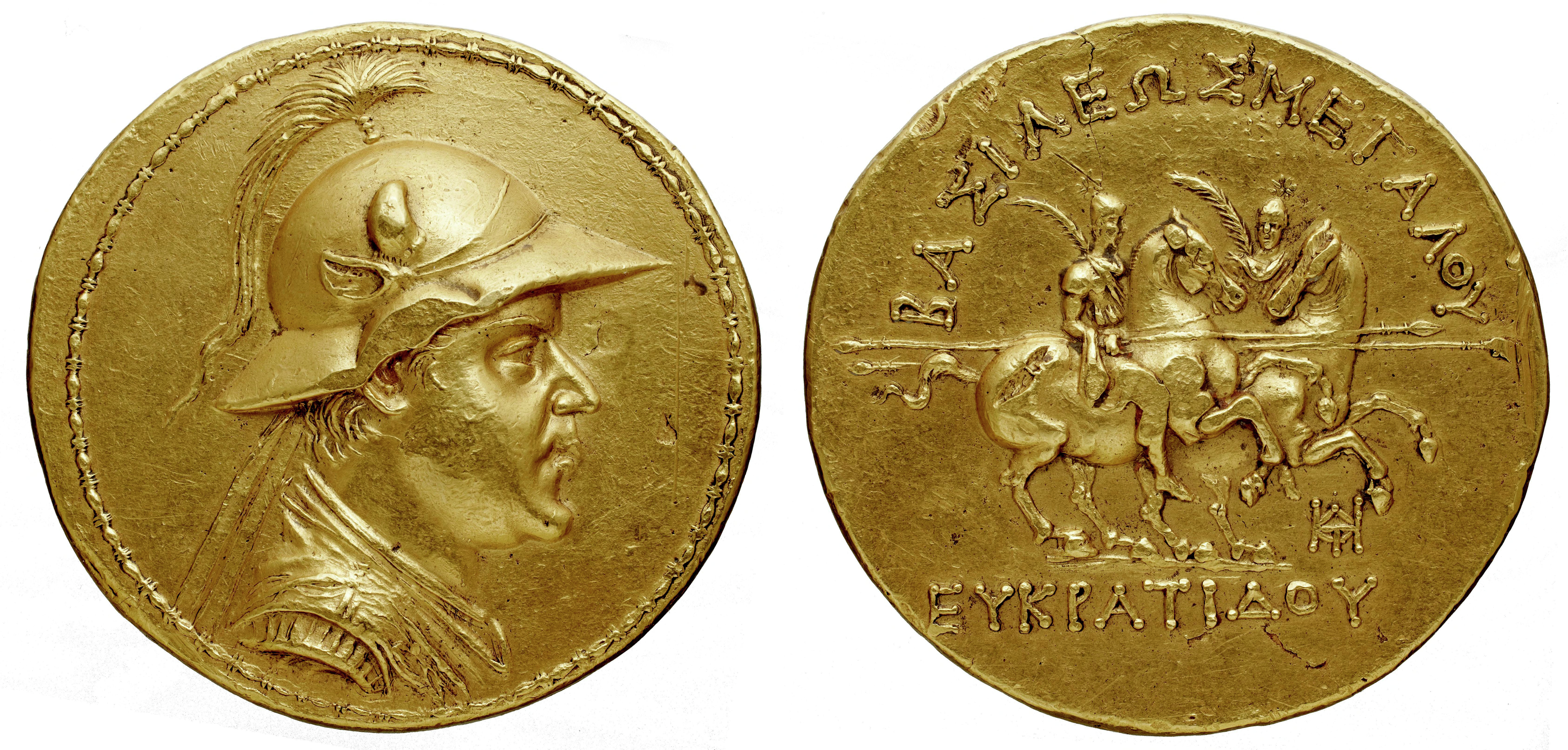
Gold 20-stater of the Greco-Bactrian king Eucratides I (c. 160 BC), the largest gold coin ever minted in Antiquity. The coin weighs 169.2 g (5.44 ozt), and has a diameter of 58 mm (2.3 in).

The silver stater minted at Corinth of 8.6 g (0.28 ozt) weight was divided into three silver drachmae of 2.9 g (0.093 ozt), but was often linked to the Athenian silver didrachm (two drachmae) weighing 8.6 g (0.28 ozt). In comparison, the Athenian silver tetradrachm (four drachmae) weighed 17.2 g (0.55 ozt). Staters were also struck in several Greek city-states such as, Aegina, Aspendos, Delphi, Knossos, Kydonia, many city-states of Ionia, Lampsacus, Megalopolis, Metapontium, Olympia, Phaistos, Poseidonia, Syracuse, Taras, Thasos, Thebes and more.

There also existed a "gold stater", but it was only minted in some places, and was mainly an accounting unit worth 20–28 drachmae depending on place and time, the Athenian unit being worth 20 drachmae. (The reason being that one gold stater generally weighed roughly 8.5 g (0.27 ozt), twice as much as a drachma, while the parity of gold to silver, after some variance, was established as 1:10). The use of gold staters in coinage seems mostly of Macedonian origin. The best known types of Greek gold staters are the 28-drachma kyzikenoi from Cyzicus.

== Non-Greek staters ==
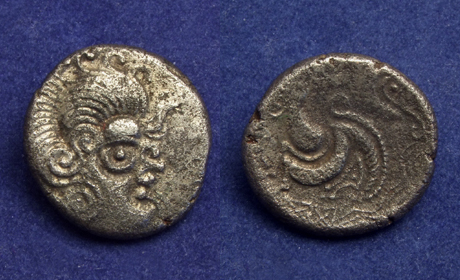
A Celtic stater made from billon alloy found in Armorica

Celtic tribes brought the concept to Western and Central Europe after obtaining it while serving as mercenaries in north Greece. Gold staters were minted in Gaul by Gallic chiefs modeled after the philippeioi of Philip II of Macedonia, which were brought back after serving in his armies, or those of his son Alexander the Great and his successors. Some of these staters in the form of the Gallo-Belgic series were imported to Britain on a large scale. These went on to influence a range of staters produced in Britain. British Gold staters generally weighed between 4.5 and 6.5 grams (0.14–0.21 ozt).

Celtic staters were also minted in present-day Czech Republic and Poland. The conquests of Alexander extended Greek culture east, leading to the adoption of staters in Asia. Gold staters have also been found from the ancient region of Gandhara from the time of Kanishka.

In 2018, archaeologists in Podzemelj, Slovenia unearthed fifteen graves at the Pezdirčeva Njiva site. In one of the graves they found a bronze belt with a gold coin. The coin was a Celtic imitation of the Alexander the Great stater, depicting Nike and Athena, and dates back to the first half of the 3rd century B.C.

The Koson staters, minted in the 1st century BC by the Dacians, represent the only known gold coins issued by this people. Bearing the Greek inscription "ΚΟΣΩΝ" and featuring Roman-inspired iconography, these coins illustrate the cultural and political interactions between the Dacians and the Roman world during this period.

== Gallery ==
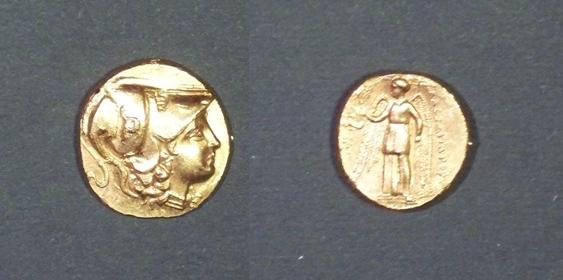
Gold stater of Alexander the Great. Obverse: Athena wearing Corinthian helmet. Reverse: Nike holding stylis and wreath. Possibly minted in Abydos c. 328–323 BC.

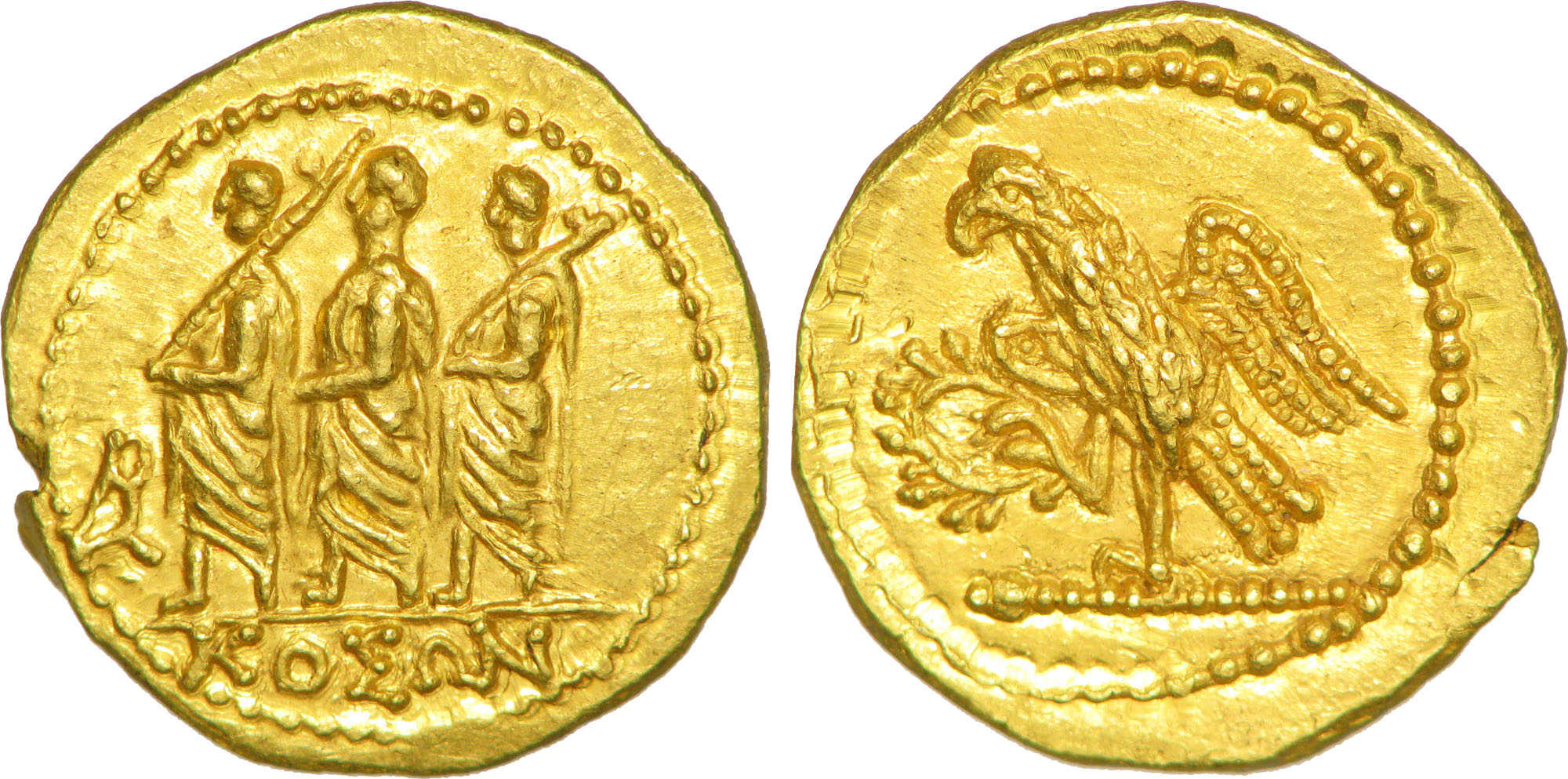
A golden Dacian stater that imitates a Roman denarius minted with the legend "ΚΟΣΩΝ"

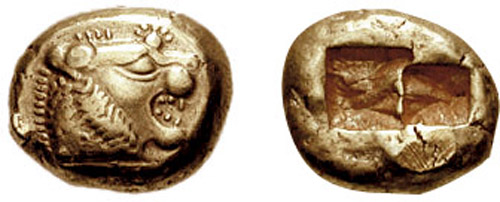
Early 6th-century BC Lydian electrum coin denominated as 1/3 stater

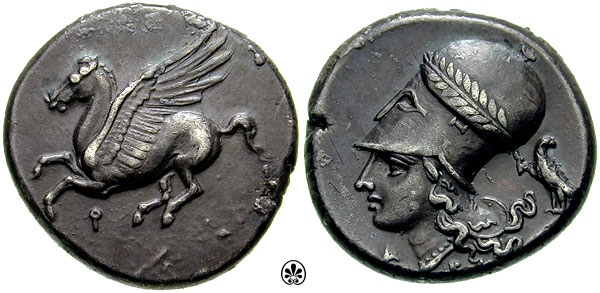
Corinthian stater. Obverse: Pegasus with Qoppa (Ϙ) beneath. Reverse: Athena wearing Corinthian helmet. Qoppa symbolised the archaic spelling of the city (Ϙόρινθος).

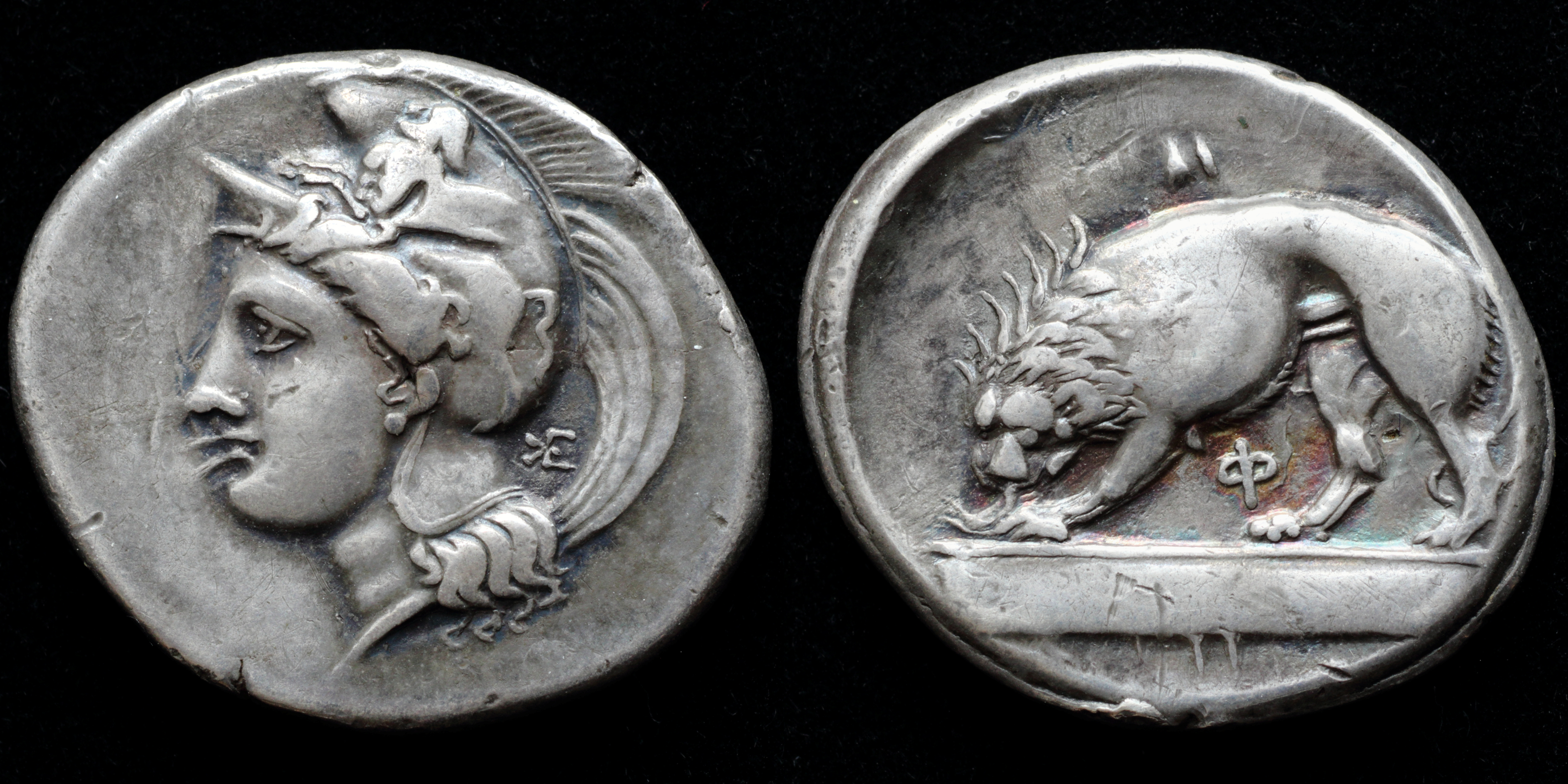
Stater struck in Velia 334–300 BC, Athena wearing a Phrygian helmet decorated with a Centaur, Lion devouring prey

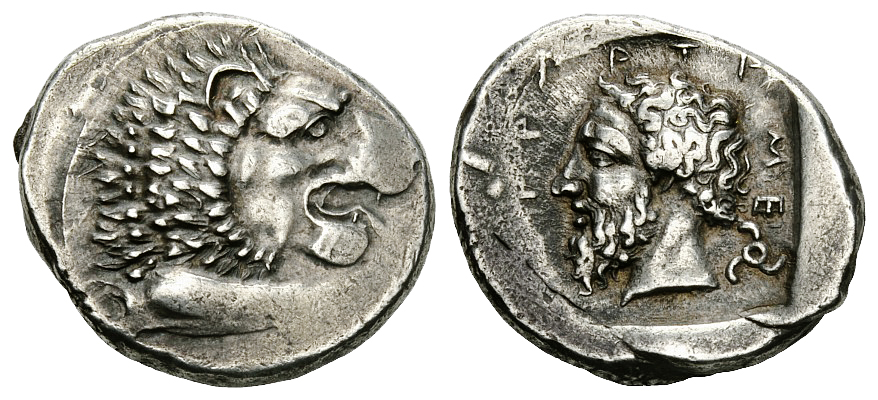
Silver stater of Mithrapata of Lycia, c. 390–370 BC

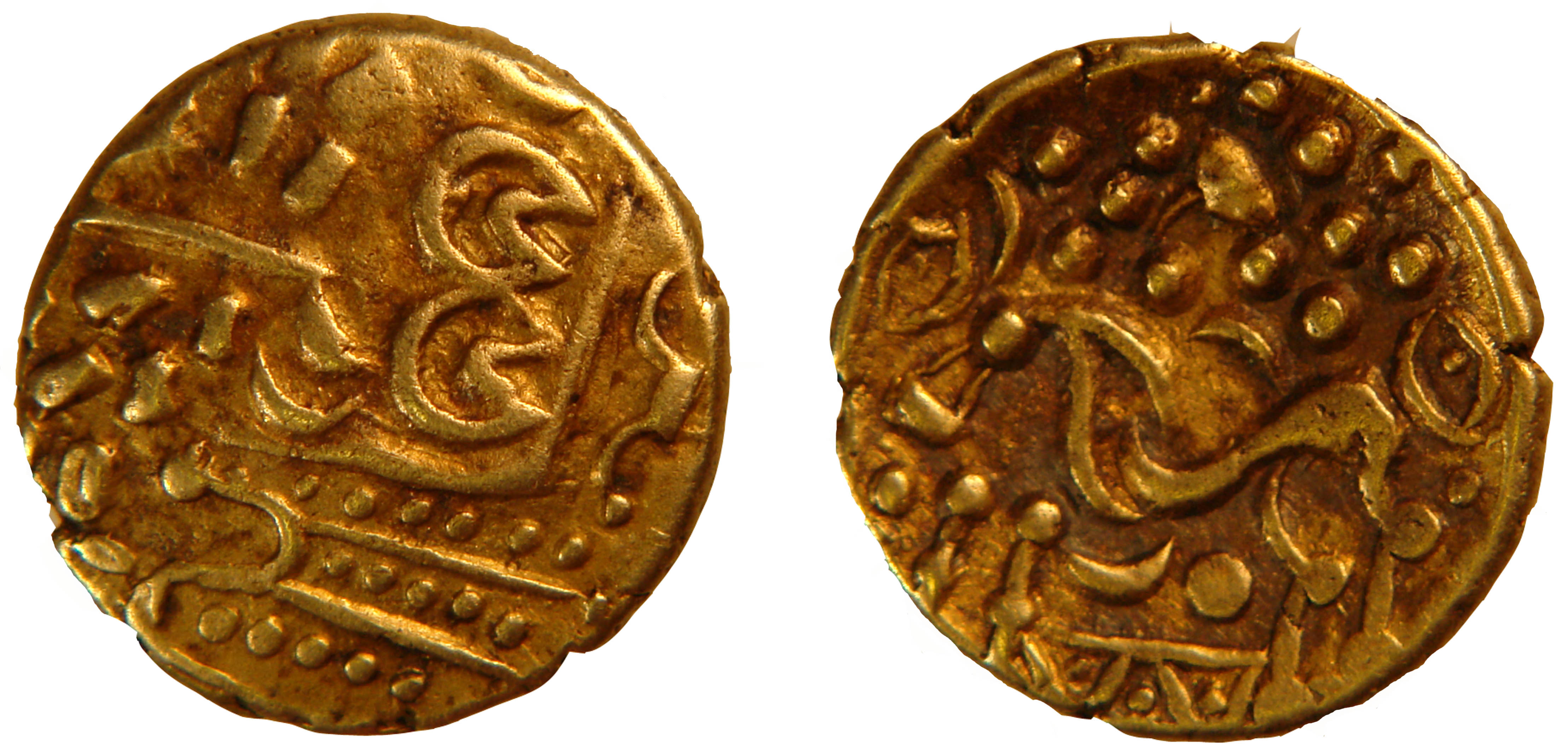
Gold stater of the Corieltauvi, 50−20 BC

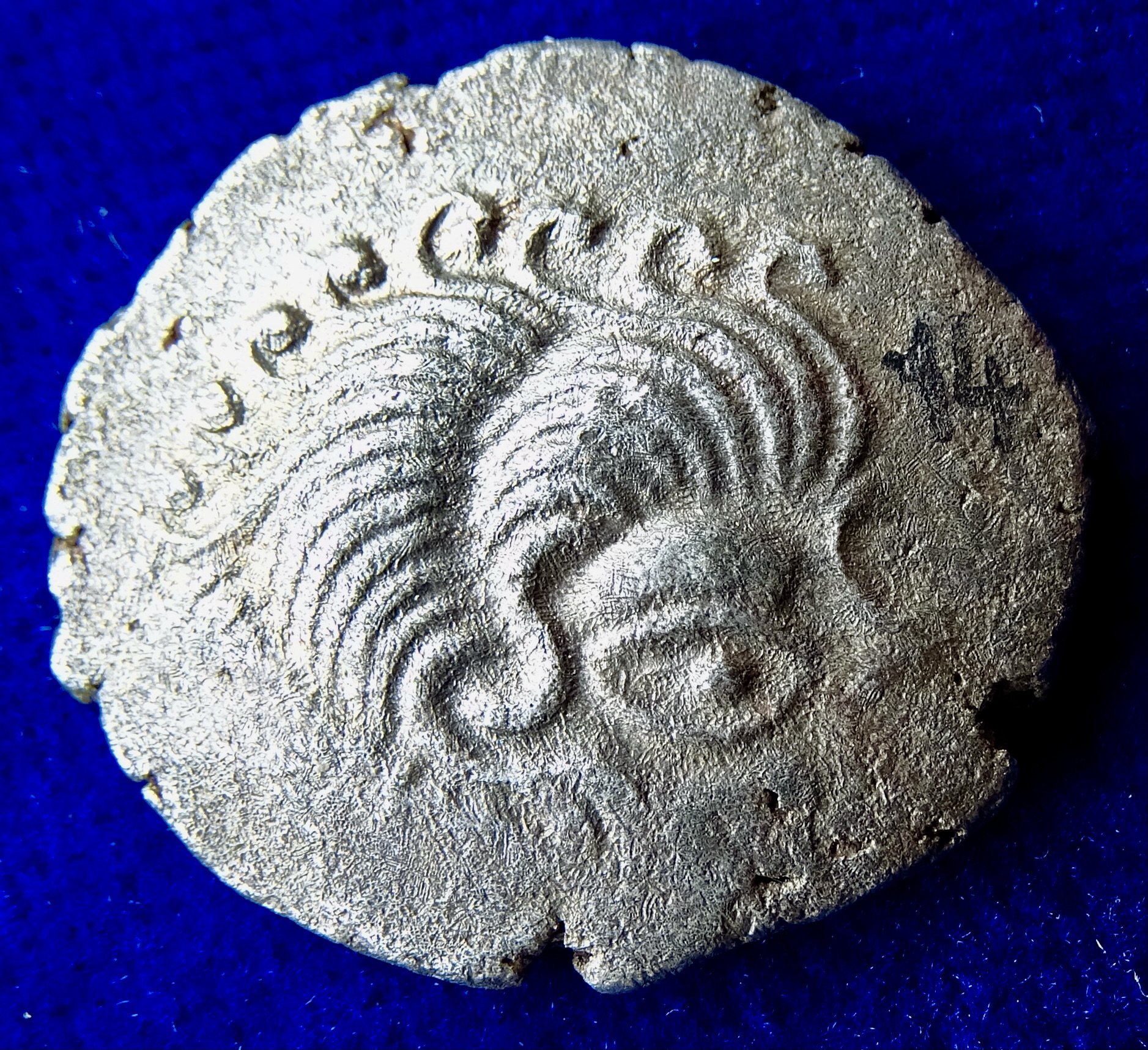
Channel Islands Armorican Billon Silver Stater about 75 BC, obverse, head r.

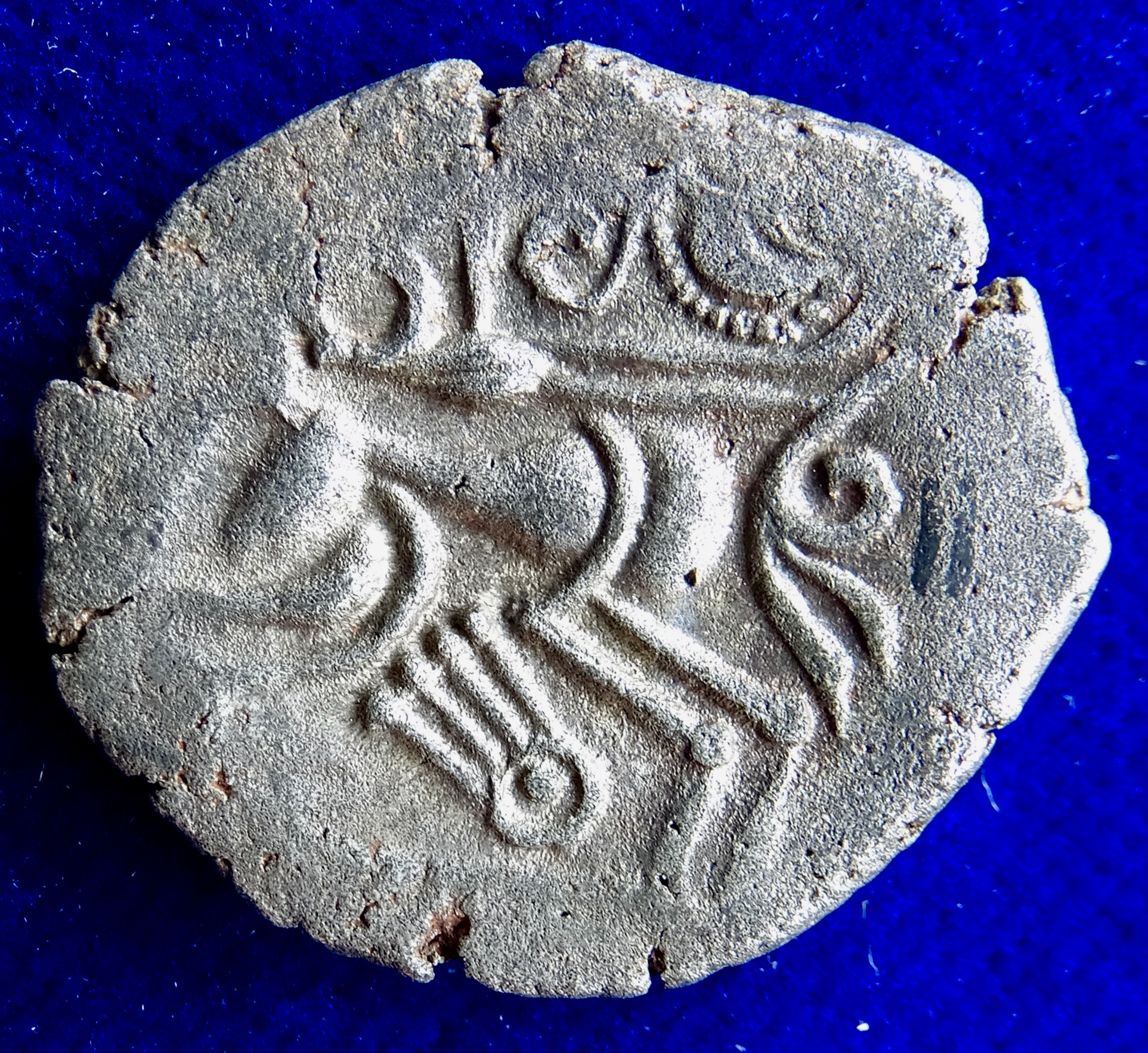
The reverse showing a stylised horse r., and a comet below

== See also ==
- Egyptian gold stater – First coin minted in ancient Egypt
- Esunertos – British Iron Age King
- Koson – Ancient Dacian coin
- Silver stater with a turtle – Coins made on Aegina, 6th century BC
