= Lictor newene =

Scientific classification
- Kingdom: Animalia
- Phylum: Arthropoda
- Subphylum: Chelicerata
- Class: Arachnida
- Order: Araneae
- Infraorder: Araneomorphae
- Family: Salticidae
- Genus: Lictor
- Species: L. newene

Binomial name
- Lictor newene Wesołowska & Henrard, 2025

Species of spider

Lictor newene is a species of jumping spider in the genus Lictor that lives in Guinea and Ivory Coast.
