= Lictor mirabilis =

Scientific classification
- Kingdom: Animalia
- Phylum: Arthropoda
- Subphylum: Chelicerata
- Class: Arachnida
- Order: Araneae
- Infraorder: Araneomorphae
- Family: Salticidae
- Genus: Lictor
- Species: L. mirabilis

Binomial name
- Lictor mirabilis (Wesołowska & Russell-Smith, 2011)

Synonyms
- Thiratoscirtus mirabilis Wesołowska & Russell-Smith, 2011

Species of jumping spider

Lictor mirabilis is a species of jumping spider in the genus Lictor that lives in the forests of Nigeria. The species was first described in 2011 by Wanda Wesołowska and Russell-Smith. Initially allocated to the genus Thiratoscirtus, the species was moved to its current genus in 2023. The spider is small, with an ovoid cephalothorax that is between 3.3 and 4.1 mm (0.13 and 0.16 in) long and a longer, thinner abdomen that is between 2.9 and 5.1 mm (0.11 and 0.20 in) long. The spider's carapace, the hard upper part of the cephalothorax, has a clear depression, or fovea, in the middle. The male has generally brown legs while the female's legs are brownish yellow. It can be distinguished from other species in the genus by its unusual copulatory organs. The male has an anvil-shaped protrusion, or apophysis, on its palpal tibia. The female has large translucent cup-like features near the front of its large epigyne and long insemination ducts. The unusual nature of its copulatory organs is recalled in its species name, which is a Latin word that can be translated as "strange".

== Taxonomy and etymology ==
Lictor mirabilis is a species of jumping spider, a member of the family Salticidae, that was first described by the arachnologists Wanda Wesołowska and Russell-Smith in 2011. It was one of over 500 species identified by Wesołowska during her career. They initially allocated the spider to the genus Thiratoscirtus, first circumscribed in 1909 by Eugène Simon.

The genus Thiratoscirtus is a member of the subtribe Thiratoscirtina in the tribe Aelurillini. Wayne Maddison allocated the tribe to the subclade Simonida in the clade Saltafresia, which is itself part of Salticoida. In 2012, Mellissa Bodner and Maddison proposed the subfamily Thiratoscirtinae for the genus and its related genera. This overlapped with a group of genera named Thiratoscirtines after the genus, created by Jerzy Prószyński in 2017. Phylogenetic analysis has shown that the genus is related to the genera Alfenus, Bacelarella, Longarenus and Malloneta. It is likely to have diverged from them between 16.3 and 18.7 million years ago.

In 2023, Wesołowska and Konrad Wiśniewski circumscribed a new genus that they termed Lictor, after the Roman civil servants that carried a bundle of rods on their shoulders. The rods recall the bristles on the male spider's palpal tibia. The new genus is also a member of the subtribe Thiratoscirtina. Thiratoscirtus mirabilis was one of five species moved to the genus at the time, of which four were from the genus Thiratoscirtus, based on some similarities in the structure of their copulatory organs. The species is named for a Latin word that can be translated "strange", which relates to the unusual shape of the spider's copulatory organs.

== Description ==
Lictor mirabilis is a medium-sized spider with unique physical features, particularly the copulatory organs. The spider's body is divided into two main parts: the cephalothorax, which is ovoid, and the abdomen, which is a long and thin oval. Males of this species have a cephalothorax measuring between 3.3 and 4.1 mm (0.13 and 0.16 in) in length and 2.4 and 3.3 mm (0.09 and 0.13 in) in width. The carapace, the hard upper part of the cephalothorax, is a broad, moderately high oval with a clear depression, or fovea, in the middle. Although it is generally brown, the carapace is characterised by a darker eye field that is covered with colourless hairs. It also has white hairs on its sides. The area around the eyes is even darker, nearly black, and there are long brown bristles and fine fines of white hairs near some of the eyes. The same white hairs form a white line on the spider's face, known as the clypeus. The underside of the cephalothorax, or sternum, is light brown.

The male has large brown chelicerae, which have a single tooth. Its other mouthparts are lighter brown. The spider's abdomen is a narrow ovoid that measures between 2.9 and 4.4 mm (0.11 and 0.17 in) in length and 1.6 and 2.2 mm (0.06 and 0.09 in) in width. The upperside is greyish with an indistinct fawn streak to the front. At least one example is marked by a mosaic pattern of blackish spots. There is a scattering of brown bristles visible on it; these are less dense to the front and denser to the rear. The underside is contrasting lighter, with some greyish spots visible on its surface. The spider's spinnerets are long and greyish-beige. The spider's legs are brown with a dense covering of brown leg hairs and spines. The forward pair of legs are longer and darker than the rest. The pedipalps, sensory organs near the mouth, are brown and covered in white hairs.

The spider has particularly unusual copulatory organs. The male has long hairs and white scales on its palpal tibia, as well as a very unusually shaped bulbous protrusion known as a tibial apophysis that is shaped like an anvil. The shape of its tibial apophysis is particularly unusual and helps distinguish the spider from others in the genus. It has a hairy cymbium that encases the palpal bulb. The bulb itself is rounded with short stumpy embolus attached to its top.

The female spider is similar in size to the male. It has a cephalothorax between 3.6 and 4 mm (0.14 and 0.16 in) long and 2.9 and 3 mm (0.12 in) wide. The carapace is similar to the male but its sternum is yellowish. Its labium and maxillae are light brown with light tips. Its abdomen is slightly larger than the male, measuring between 2.9 and 5.1 mm (0.20 in) in length and 2 mm (0.08 in) and 3 mm in width. The upperside of the abdomen is covered in a mosaic of grey spots apart from a light patch towards its rear. There is a white streak across the sides and the rear edge. The underside is light with a darker patch in the middle. The spider's legs are brownish-yellow.

The female's copulatory organs are also unusual. The spider's epigyne, or external copulatory organ, is unusually large with strong evidence of sclerotization on its rear edge. There are large translucent cup-like features near the front of the epigyne. The two copulatory openings lead to long insemination ducts that follow a long loop to small single-chambered spermathecae, or receptacles.

== Distribution and habitat ==
Lictor spiders generally live in Africa and are particularly common in the forests of Central and West Africa. Lictor mirabilis is endemic to Nigeria. The male holotype was found in the Gambari Forest Reserve south of Ibadan in 1974. Other specimens have been found nearby. Some examples were found near streams or rivers. Others live in fallow bush.
