= Henry S. Taylor =

American poet

Henry Taylor
- Born: Henry Splawn Taylor; June 21, 1942 (age 84); Lincoln, Virginia, U.S.
- Died: October 13, 2024 (aged 82)
- Spouse: Mooshe Taylor
- Awards: Pulitzer Prize for Poetry (1986)

Academic background
- Education: University of Virginia (BA); Hollins University (MA)

Academic work
- Discipline: Creative writing
- Sub-discipline: Poetry
- Institutions: American University; Roanoke College; University of Utah

Henry Splawn Taylor (June 21, 1942 – October 13, 2024) was an American poet, academic, and translator. The author of more than 15 books of poems, translation, and nonfiction, he won the Pulitzer Prize for Poetry in 1986.

== Early life and education ==
Taylor was born in Lincoln, Virginia, in rural Loudoun County, where he was raised as a Quaker. He went to high school at George School in Newtown, Pennsylvania. He earned a Bachelor of Arts degree from the University of Virginia in 1965 and a Master of Arts from Hollins University in 1966.

== Career ==
Taylor taught literature and co-directed the Master of Fine Arts program in creative writing at American University from 1971 to 2003.

Taylor won the Pulitzer Prize for Poetry in 1986 for his book The Flying Change. His additional honors include two fellowships from the National Endowment for the Arts, two awards from the American Academy of Arts and Letters, and the Aiken Taylor Award for Modern American Poetry.

== Personal life ==
Taylor met his first wife, Frances Carney Taylor, when they both attended Hollins University, and they married in 1968. They lived briefly in Salt Lake City before returning to Northern Virginia with their two sons, settling in Lincoln, Virginia in 1977. The couple divorced in 1996. From 2015, Taylor and his second wife, fiber artist Mooshe Taylor, lived in Santa Fe, New Mexico.

== Bibliography ==
- This Tilted World Is Where I Live: New and Selected Poems 1962–2020, Louisiana State University Press, 2020. ISBN 978-0-8071-7177-6
- Crooked Run, Louisiana State University Press, 2006. ISBN 978-0-8071-3125-1
- Brief Candles: 101 Clerihews, Louisiana State University Press, 2000. ISBN 978-0-8071-2564-9
- Electra (a verse translation of Sophocles' play in Sophocles I), University of Pennsylvania Press, 1998. ISBN 978-0-8122-1653-0
- Understanding Fiction: Poems, 1986–1996, Louisiana State University Press, 1996. ISBN 978-0-8071-2111-5
- Curculio (a translation of the play by Titus Maccius Plautus in Plautus: The Comedies, Volume 1), Johns Hopkins University Press. ISBN 978-0-8018-5070-7
- Compulsory Figures: Essays on Recent American Poets, Louisiana State University Press, 1992. ISBN 978-0-8071-1755-2
- The Flying Change, Louisiana State University Press, 1986. ISBN 978-0-8071-1263-2
- The Children of Herakles, Oxford University Press, 1982. ISBN 978-0-19-507288-4
- The Water of Light: A Miscellany in Honor of Brewster Ghiselin, University of Utah Press, 1976. ISBN 0-87480-105-2
- An Afternoon of Pocket Billiards, University of Utah Press, 1975. ISBN 0-87480-098-6
- Poetry: Points of Departure, Winthrop, 1974. ISBN 978-0-87626-678-6
- Breakings, Solo Press, 1969.
- The Girl in the Black Raincoat, Duell, Sloan and Pearce, 1966. ASIN B000FREQKI
- The Horse Show at Midnight and An Afternoon of Pocket Billiards, Louisiana State University Press, 1965. ISBN 978-0-8071-1763-7
