= Philippeioi =

Ancient Macedonian gold coins

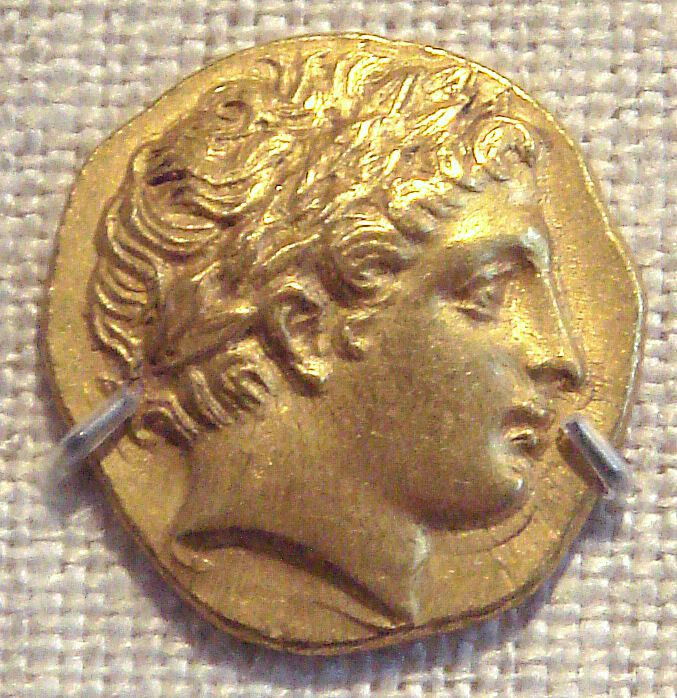
The obverse of a gold philippeios, with (short-haired) Apollo.

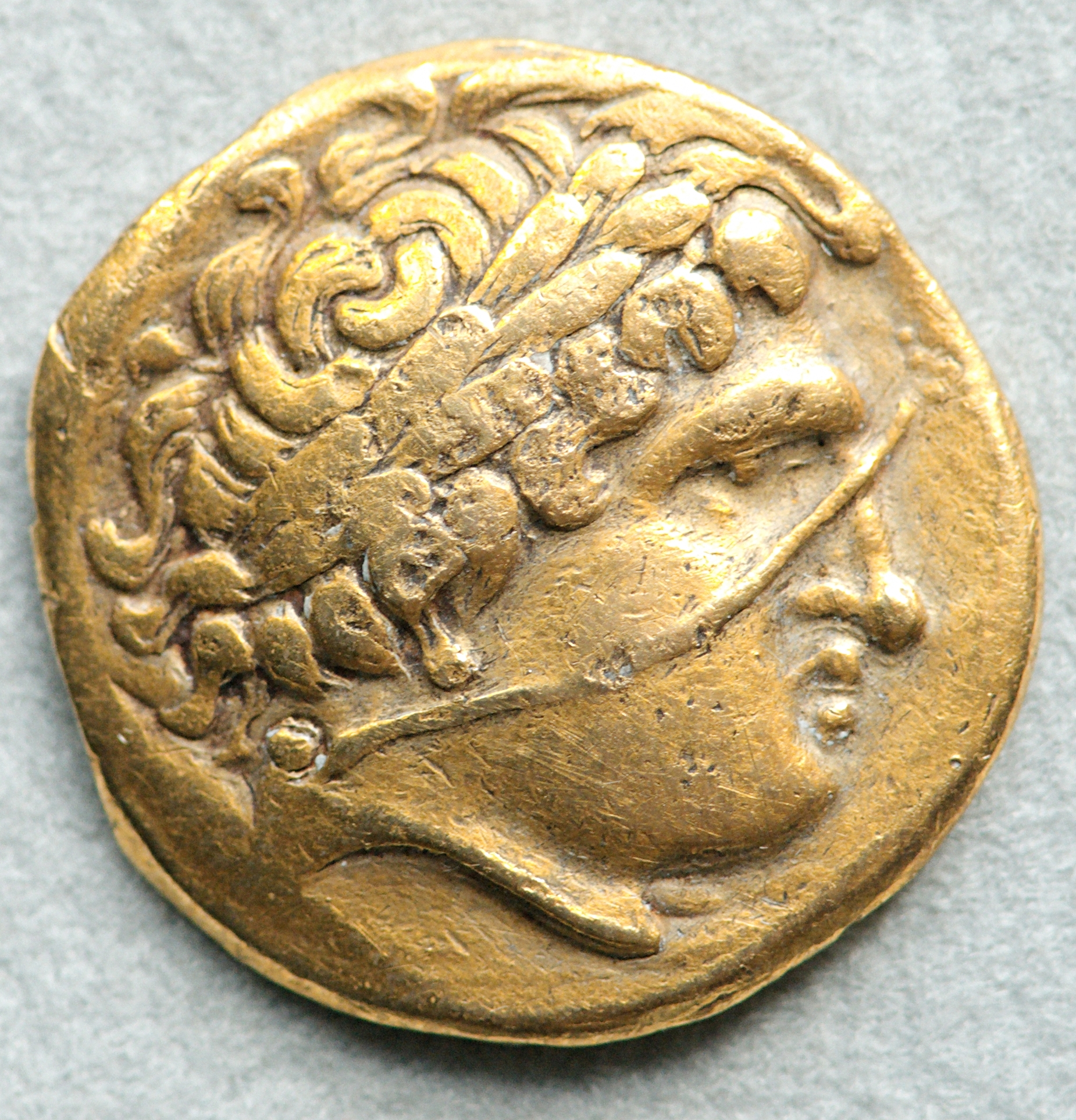
A Gaulish stater imitating the philippeios' design

Philippeioi (Greek: Φιλίππειοι, Philíppeioi), later called Alexanders (Ἀλέξανδροι, Aléxandroi), were the gold coins used in the ancient Greek Kingdom of Macedonia. First issued at some point between 355 and 347 BC, the coins featured a portrait of the Greek deity Apollo on the obverse, and on the reverse, an illustration of a biga, a Greek chariot drawn by two horses. They had the value of one gold stater each. In the first issuing, Apollo was depicted with long hair, but after that the design was altered permanently to one in which Apollo's hair was shorter.

The coins were intended primarily for large purchases outside of Macedonia. As a result, they spread quickly, first to the Balkans and continental Greece, and eventually throughout the Western world of the time; stashes of philippeioi have been uncovered in Italy, Constantinople, Southern Russia, Cyprus, Syria, and Egypt. The vast majority of these were actually struck by Philip's successor, Alexander the Great. The philippeioi issued by Alexander after Philip's death continued to use that name officially, though they were often called "alexanders" by Alexander's supporters.

== Iconography ==
Coins circulated widely in classical antiquity. Royal coinage had existed since the time of Alexander I; however, gold coins were not minted in Macedonia prior to the reign of Philip II. Silver coins came first and were minted in greater quantities than gold. Greek deities feature prominently in the iconography of Philip, Alexander and their attributes are keys to interpreting the symbolic intent of the coinage. Deities most commonly pictured on the currency include Apollo, Ares, Athena, Heracles, Nike, and Zeus.

=== Alexander III and Philip II ===
On the gold staters, Alexander replaced Philip's Apollo with his female counterpart, Athena, associating wisdom and war; on the silver, the pose of Zeus on his father's coins found its parallel in the head of Herakles on his son's. Both used this iconography to communicate messages about divine ancestry and military virtues, although with distinct scopes: while Philip focused on symbols of continental Greek recognition (such as Olympic victories), Alexander selected deities with transcultural appeal, understandable to both Greeks and the peoples of Asia.

In chronological and geographical terms, the conception of this new imperial iconography of Alexander is situated in Tarsus, probably after the Battle of Issus (333 BC). Evidence suggests that the minting of tetradrachms featuring Herakles and seated Zeus began around 333/332 BC, incorporating oriental stylistic elements—such as influences from the figure of Baal on the coins of Sidon—demonstrating a rapid adaptation of Macedonian propaganda to the context of the new empire forming in the East.

== Influence ==
Considered the most famous coins to be struck by king Philip II, the philippeioi continued to be highly influential even after they were no longer in circulation. Their design was widely mimicked or replicated by currencies outside of Greece, even long after the philippeioi themselves were no longer in circulation. The Gaulish gold staters, whose design closely mimicked that of the philippeioi, continued to be minted up until the end of the Gallic Wars three centuries later (51 BC). In many cases, the design of the coins changed as it was appropriated by cultures outside of Greece; in some Gaulish imitations, Apollo's hair became large and stylized, while the chariot was often reduced to a single horse (sometimes sporting a humanoid head), with the remaining space occupied by Celtic symbols such as a sun cross, the head of a boar, or a depiction of the sun god Ogmios. The coins were so widespread that in many ancient Roman texts, the word philippeioi is used generically, to refer to any heavy gold coins.
