= Koson (coin) =

Ancient Dacian coin

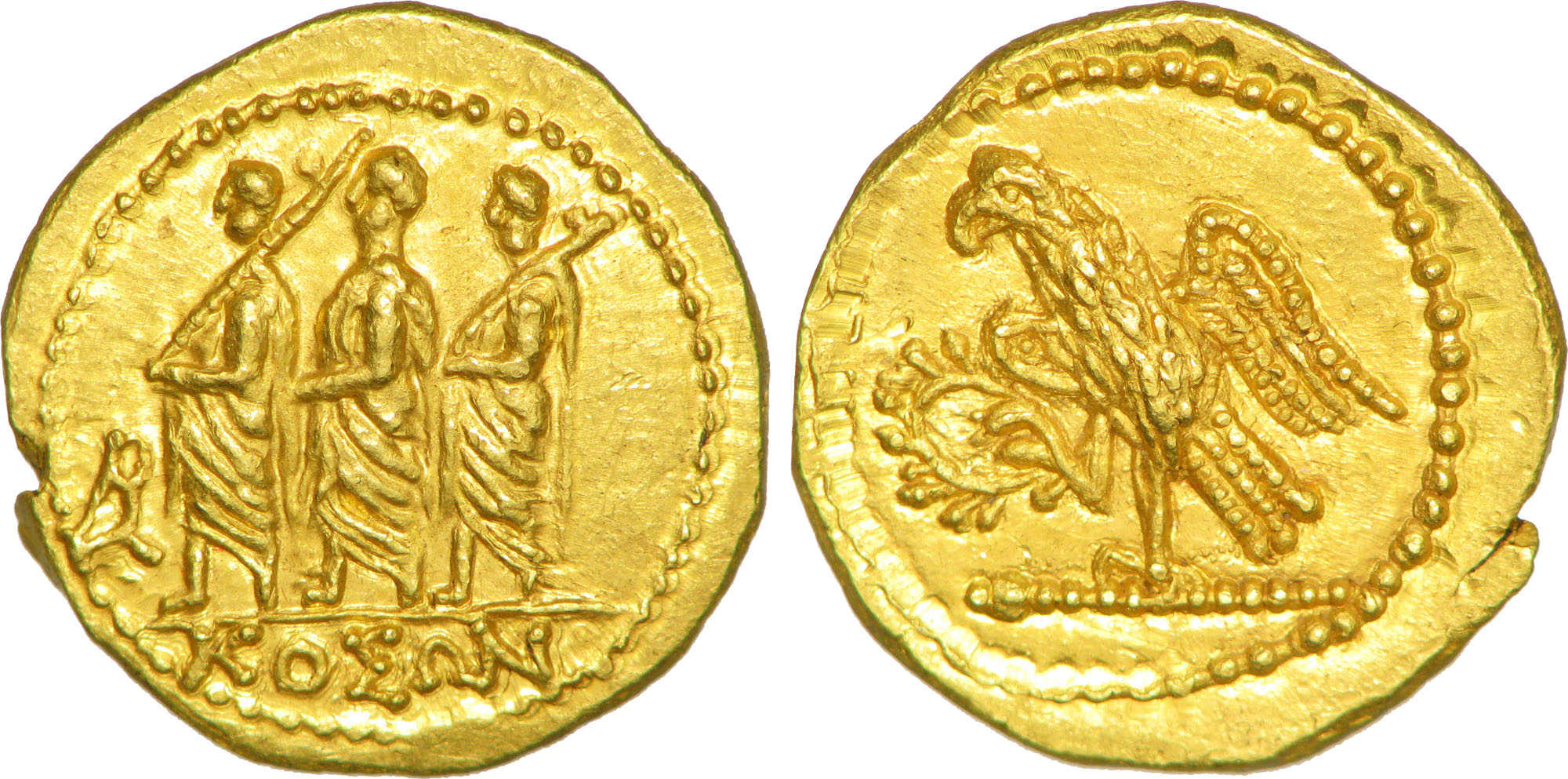
A golden stater that imitates a Roman denarius minted with the Greek legend "ΚΟΣΩΝ".

The Kosons are the only series of gold coins known to be minted by the Dacians. They are named after the Greek inscription "ΚΟΣΩΝ", which appears on the reverse. The name Koson is believed to refer to an otherwise unattested Dacian king, although some scholars have proposed an identification with Cotison, a Dacian ruler mentioned by Horace and Suetonius. The staters are notable for their Roman-inspired iconography and are thought to have been struck in the mid-late 1st century BC.

== Design and Iconography ==
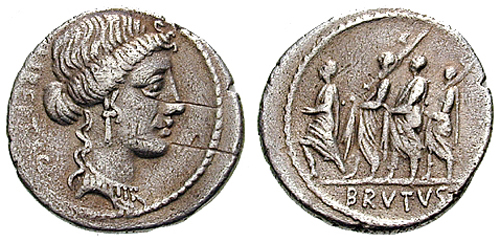
A denarius of Brutus, the same type of the coin that served as the prototype for the reverse of the Koson coinage.

The reverse depicts three togate figures walking left—two carrying fasces lictoriae over their shoulders—interpreted as a Roman consul flanked by two lictors, inspired by a denarius issued by Marcus Junius Brutus in 54 BC. The obverse shows an eagle standing on a scepter, clutching a laurel wreath in its claw, the design being similar to one found on coins issued by Q. Pomponius Rufus, Triumvir Monetalis, around 73 BC.

== Discovery and Hoards ==
Coins bearing the inscription "ΚΟΣΩΝ" have been discovered in several large hoards across Transylvania, the most significant of which was unearthed in 1543. This find included thousands of gold coins and other artifacts. A legend emerged that the treasure had been hidden in a vaulted chamber beneath the Strei river, identified by some as the Sargetia river mentioned by Dio Cassius, but later research situated the hoard within a Dacian fortress in the Orăștie mountains, likely Sarmizegetusa Regia. The discovery sparked scholarly interest in the name "Koson." Among the earliest references are comments by Erasmus in 1520 and Stephanus Zamosius in 1593.

== Historical interpretations of Koson ==
Most modern scholars agree that the name Koson likely refers to a local Dacian or Thracian king otherwise unattested in historical sources. Vasile Pârvan proposed that Koson may have been a Thracian dynast who employed the Getae, a Dacian tribe, in plundering raids across the Danube, paying them with his own coinage. Theodor Mommsen argued that Koson was possibly a Dacian ally of Marcus Junius Brutus, as the coinage closely resembles Brutus' denarii. Other scholars have suggested that Koson may be identical to Cotison, a Dacian king mentioned by Horace (Odes III.8.18) and Suetonius (Augustus 63), who was active during the reign of Augustus and known to have conducted raids beyond the Danube.
