= Curculio (play) =

Latin comedic play by Titus Maccius Plautus

- Original language: Latin
- Written by: Titus Maccius Plautus
- Characters: Palinurus, slave of Phaedromus; Phaedromus, young man Leaena, old woman Planesium, slave girl of Cappadox; Cappadox, pimp cook Curculio, parasite Lyco, banker producer Therapontigonus, soldier
- Genre: Roman comedy
- Setting: a street in Epidaurus, before the houses of Phaedromus and Cappadox, and a temple of Aesculapius

Premiere
- Date: c. 205–184 BC
- Place: Rome?

Curculio, also called The Weevil, is a Latin comedic play for the early Roman theatre by Titus Maccius Plautus. It is the shortest of Plautus's surviving plays.

The date of the play is not known, but de Melo suggests it may come from the middle period of Plautus's career (c. 205–184 BC), from the moderate amount of musical passages it contains. Other indications of date are a possible reference in lines 509–511 to a law of 197 BC on money-lending, and from the mention of gold philippics (440 BC), a coin which may have become familiar in Rome after the war in Macedonia of 194 BC.

== Plot ==
In Curculio, Phaedromus is in love with Planesium, a slave girl belonging to the pimp Cappadox. Phaedromus sends Curculio (a stock parasite character) to Caria to borrow money from a friend. Unsuccessful, Curculio happens to run into Therapontigonus, a soldier who intends to purchase Planesium. After Curculio learns of his plans, he steals the soldier's ring and returns to Phaedromus. They fake a letter and seal it using the ring. Wearing a disguise, Curculio takes it to the soldier's banker Lyco, tricking him into thinking he was sent by Therapontigonus. Lyco pays Cappadox, under the conditions that the money will be returned if it is later discovered that she is freeborn. Curculio takes the girl to Phaedromus. When the trick is later discovered, the angry Therapontigonus confronts the others. However, Planesium has discovered from the ring that she is actually Therapontigonus's sister. Since she is freeborn, Therapontigonus's money is returned, and Planesium is allowed to marry Phaedromus.

The play is set in Epidaurus (line 341), in Greece. On the stage are the houses of Phaedromus and Cappadox, and between them a temple of Aesculapius, the god of healing.

== Metrical structure ==
Plautus's plays are traditionally divided into five acts. However, it is not thought that the act-divisions go back to Plautus's time. The structure of the plays is often more clearly shown by the variation in metres. A common pattern in Plautus is for a metrical section to begin with iambic senarii (which were unaccompanied by music), followed optionally by a musical passage or song, and ending with trochaic septenarii, which were recited or sung to the music of a pair of pipes known as tibiae.

The metrical structure of the Curculio is very simple. Taking A = iambic senarii, B = other metres, C = trochaic septenarii, with a break after each C passage, the order of passages might be seen as follows:

ABC, AC, AC, BC, AC

C. W. Marshall (2006), however, prefers the following break-down, starting each section (or "arc") with iambic senarii:

ABC, AC, ACBC, AC

He points out the effectiveness of the sudden change to iambic senarii, when the music stops, at the moment when the soldier reveals where he got the ring (line 635).

There is one polymetric canticum (96–157), and one passage of 90 lines of iambic septenarii (371–461). Apart from this the only metres used are the usual iambic senarii and trochaic septenarii. As with several other plays, the first music is sung by a female character. The iambic septenarii, which are often associated with love, are used when Planesium is brought out from Cappadox's house and seen off by the slave-dealer. Another short passage of iambic septenarii (125–7) is used when Leaena pours a libation of wine to the goddess Venus.

=== Phaedromus visits Planesium ===
- Act 1.1 (1-95): iambic senarii (95 lines)

It is before dawn. The young man Phaedromus enters carrying a lantern and followed by attendants. His slave Palinurus asks where he is going. Phaedromus explains that he is in love with a girl kept by a slave-dealer in the nearby house, whom in the near future the slave-dealer intends to rent out as a courtesan. Phaedromus sprinkles the door with wine to tempt out the old female door-keeper, who is fond of wine.

- Act 1.2 (96-157) polymetric song (aeolics, an, ia-tr, cr, ba, ia7) (62 lines)

The old doorkeeper, Leaena, smells the wine and tries to find the bowl in the dark. While Palinurus makes comments and suggestions on the side, Phaedromus tells her he is dying of love. In return for wine she goes to fetch Planesium, the girl he loves. While waiting, Phaedromus addresses the door.

- Act 1.3 (158-215): trochaic septenarii (58 lines)

Encouraged by Palinurus, Phaedromus embraces Planesium. But when Palinurus starts criticising Planesium and advising Phaedromus that he is going too far, Phaedromus grows angry and strikes him. Phaedromus tells Planesium that he has sent his parasite (hanger-on) to Caria to fetch some money, with which he intends to buy her freedom. Planesium goes back inside the slave-dealer's house, and Phaedromus and Palinurus retire to Phaedromus's house.

=== Curculio returns with a plan ===
- Act 2.1–2.2 (216-279): iambic senarii (64 lines)

Between the two houses is a temple of Aesculapius, the god of healing. The slave-dealer Cappadox comes out of the temple, his swollen stomach apparently not cured by spending a night in the temple. Palinurus comes out of Phaedromus's house and he and the slave-dealer recognise each other's voices. Cappadox tells Palinurus that his stomach is troubling him, and asks if he can interpret a dream. Before he can do so, Phaedromus's cook comes out and tells Palinurus that Palinurus needs to prepare things for the breakfast celebrating the parasite's return. Palinurus assures Cappadox that the cook can interpret dreams better than he can, and he goes inside. Cappadox tells the cook that he had a dream in which he saw Aesculapius, who had ignored him. The cook advises him, and Cappadox goes back into the temple. Now Palinurus (or the cook?) sees the parasite approaching down the street.

- Act 2.3 (280-370): trochaic septenarii (91 lines)

Curculio approaches rapidly, calling on passers-by to clear the way. He and Phaedromus greet each other. The ever-hungry parasite puts on a show of being ill from lack of food, and Phaedromus assures him that breakfast is ready. Curculio tells Phaedromus that his friend in Caria wasn't able to lend him the money asked for. However, when he was there he had met a certain man who revealed that he was in love with a prostitute in Epidaurus and intended to buy her. When Curculio realised he was talking about Planesium, he had got the man drunk and stolen his signet ring. Now he tells Phaedromus that they can forge a letter, get the money from the banker, and buy Planesium.

=== Curculio tricks the banker ===
- Act 3.1 (371-461): iambic senarii (90 lines)

The banker Lyco appears, congratulating himself that his balance sheet is in the black. Curculio approaches, disguised in a costume with an eye-patch, and the banker comments on Curculio's missing eye, which Curculio says he lost in a battle. Pretending not to know who he is, Curculio asks him if he knows the banker Lyco. He explains that he has been sent by a certain soldier called Therapontigonus Platagidorus to collect a slave girl whose sale had been agreed earlier; and that Lyco is to pay for the girl on receipt of the letter. Curculio adds enough circumstantial detail of the soldier's imaginary triumphs to make his story plausible. Cappadox comes out and Lyco explains his business. They all go inside Lyco's house.

- Act 4.1 (462-486): trochaic septenarii (24 lines)

A choragus, or theatre chorus-producer, who has lent Phaedromus the costume used by Curculio, appears, explaining that he has come to keep an eye on the costume. While waiting outside the house, he amuses the audience by describing characters of Rome and the locations where they may be found.

- Act 4.2 (487-532): iambic septenarii (46 lines)

Curculio, Cappadox, and Lyco come out with Planesium. Lyco reminds Cappadox that the terms are that if Planesium turns out to be free-born, he is to give the money back; Cappadox agrees. Curculio declares that neither slave-dealers nor bankers are to be trusted and so he cares nothing for their guarantees. As he leaves, Cappadox asks him to look after Planesium, as she has been well and chastely brought up. They take their leave and Cappadox goes back into the temple.

- Act 4.3–5.2 (533-634): trochaic septenarii (101 lines)

Therapontigonus now appears with Lyco; he is demanding his money, but Lyco says it has already been paid to a one-eyed man called "Summanus" who had presented him with a sealed letter. Cappadox now comes out of the temple and he in turn says he has handed over Planesium to the soldier's messenger. Therapontigonus realises that he has been cheated by Curculio and goes off to look for him.

Curculio comes out of Phaedromus's house, complaining that Planesium had bitten his hand trying to seize the ring which he had stolen from Therapontigonus. Planesium brings Phaedromus outside, telling him that the ring used to belong to her father, and wanting to know where Curculio got it. Now Therapontigonus comes back. He demands that Curculio either give him the money or the girl. Phaedromus informs him that Planesium is free-born, so he is going to take Therapontigonus to court for enslaving a free woman. Curculio says he will be a witness. Therapontigonus begins to fight Curculio. The others beg him to say where he got the ring.

=== All ends well ===
- Act 5.2 (cont.) (635–678): iambic senarii (41 lines)

Eventually the soldier reveals that the ring used to belong to his father. Planesium delightedly greets him as her brother. Therapontigonus at first is suspicious, but at last, after she has mentioned certain details and shown him a ring which he once gave her, he recognises her as his sister. The ever-hungry Curculio suggests that they should both hold dinners to celebrate the reunion. Phaedromus asks the soldier to betroth his sister to him, which Therapontigonus agrees to.

- Act 5.3 (679-729): trochaic septenarii (51 lines)

Now Cappadox returns, and Therapontigonus seizes him. Planesium pleads for him, since he treated her well. But all of them insist that he must return the money, which eventually, reluctantly, he does.

== Translations ==
- Henry Thomas Riley, 1912:
- Paul Nixon, 1916-38:
- George E. Duckworth, 1942
- Christopher Stace, 1981
- Henry S. Taylor, 1995
- Amy Richlin, 2005
- Wolfang de Melo, 2011
- T. Yılmaz Öğüt, 2016, “Buğday Kurdu”
- Nurullah Ataç, 1964, Meb Yayınları

== Bibliography ==
- Zwierlein, Otto (1990). Zur Kritik und Exegese des Plautus I: Poenulus und Curculio [On the (Textual) Criticism and Exegesis of Plautus I: Poenulus and Curculio]. Wiesbaden: Steiner, ISBN 3-515-05725-0.
