= Zlot (currency) =

Archaic European currency

The zlot was a currency used in both medieval and modern times in Eastern Europe. It was widely used in Poland, which now uses the złoty. It was also used in the Ottoman Empire, Russia, Moldavia, Wallachia and Transylvania. It was used as an exchange currency by the merchants who passed through these countries and was recognized by the Tartars who demanded their tributes in zlot. It is a Slavic word.

The word could be roughly translated as 'gold coin.'
