= Beki Bosse Matie Classified Forest =

Protected area in Ivory Coast

- Bossematie Forest Reserve
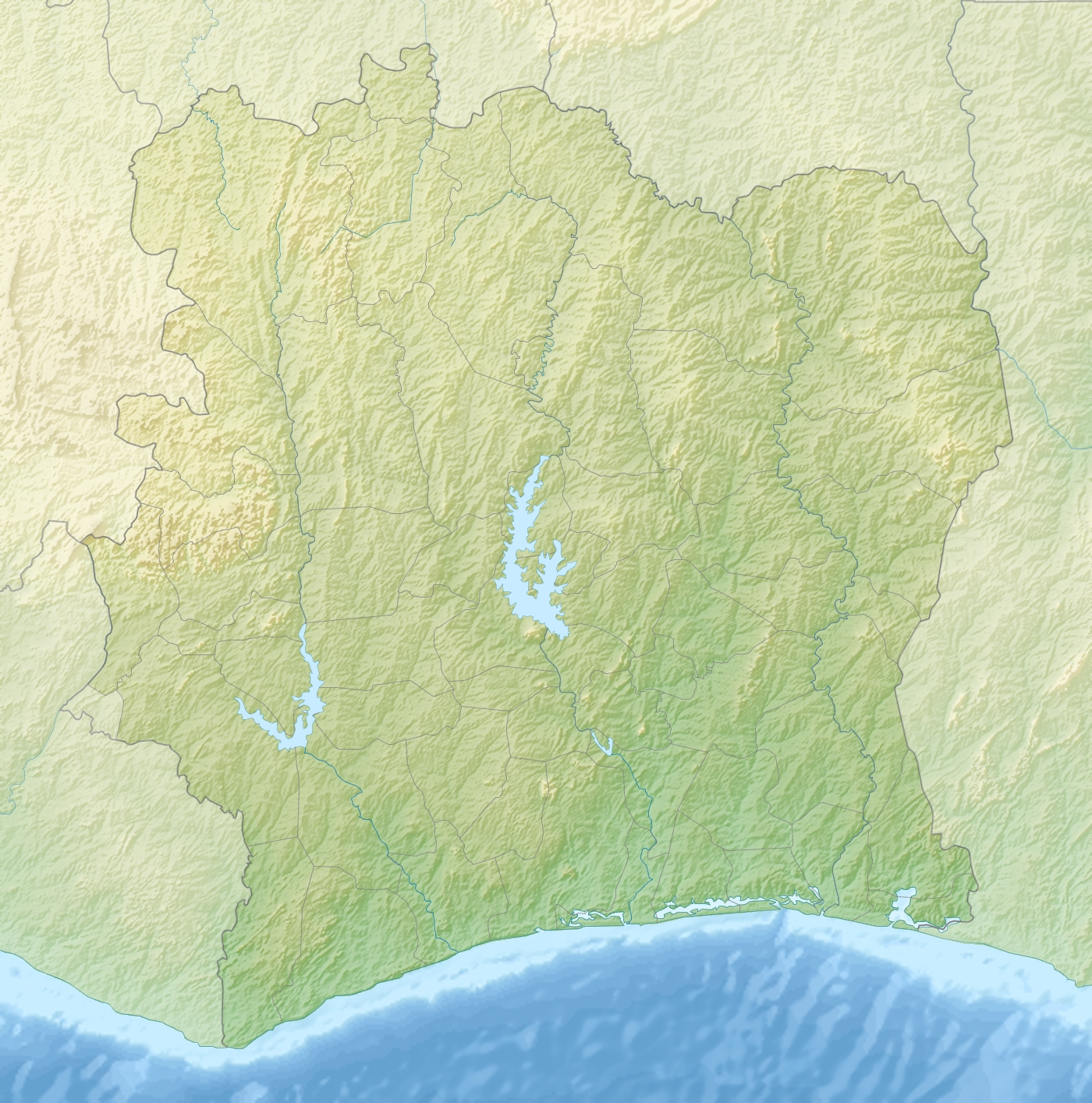
- Location within Ivory Coast
- Location: Comoé District
- Nearest city: Abengourou
- Coordinates: 06°31′00″N 03°32′59″W
- Area: 22,848 ha (56,460 acres)

The Beki Bosse Matie Classified Forest, or Bossematie Forest Reserve, is a protected area in south-eastern Ivory Coast, West Africa.

== Geography ==
The reserve covers an area of 22,848 ha. It lies 40 km south of the city of Abengourou in the Indénié-Djuablin region. It is bordered by the Comoé river on the south and the Bossematié river on the west. The average annual rainfall is 1,400 mm.

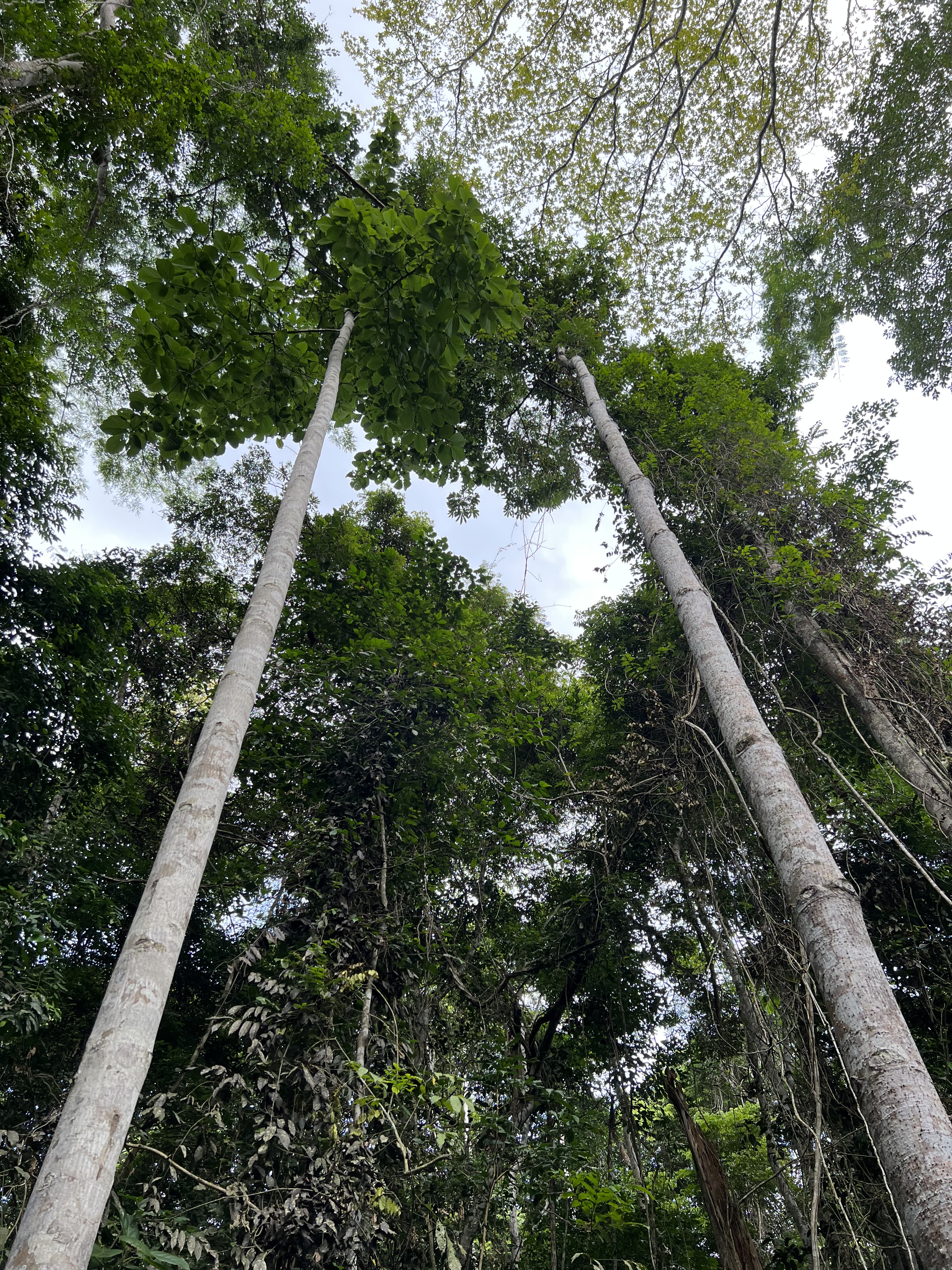
Trees in the Bossematie Forest

=== Environment ===
The reserve is vegetated with semi-deciduous forest but is surrounded by farmland. It has a gently undulating terrain with a series of ridges and intervening valleys. It has several small seasonal streams, but no permanent water. The domiinant trees are Triplochiton scleroxylon, Khaya ivorensis, Piptadeniastrum africanum and Celtis species. The site was logged between 1960 and 1990, leaving about 40% canopy cover. The understorey has been invaded by the introduced weed Chromolaena odorata.

The reserve has been designated an Important Bird Area (IBA) by BirdLife International because it supports significant populations of many bird species, though its hornbill populations have suffered from poaching. Mammals recorded from the site include forest elephants and western chimpanzees.
