= Lictor =

Bodyguard and attendant to ancient Roman magistrates

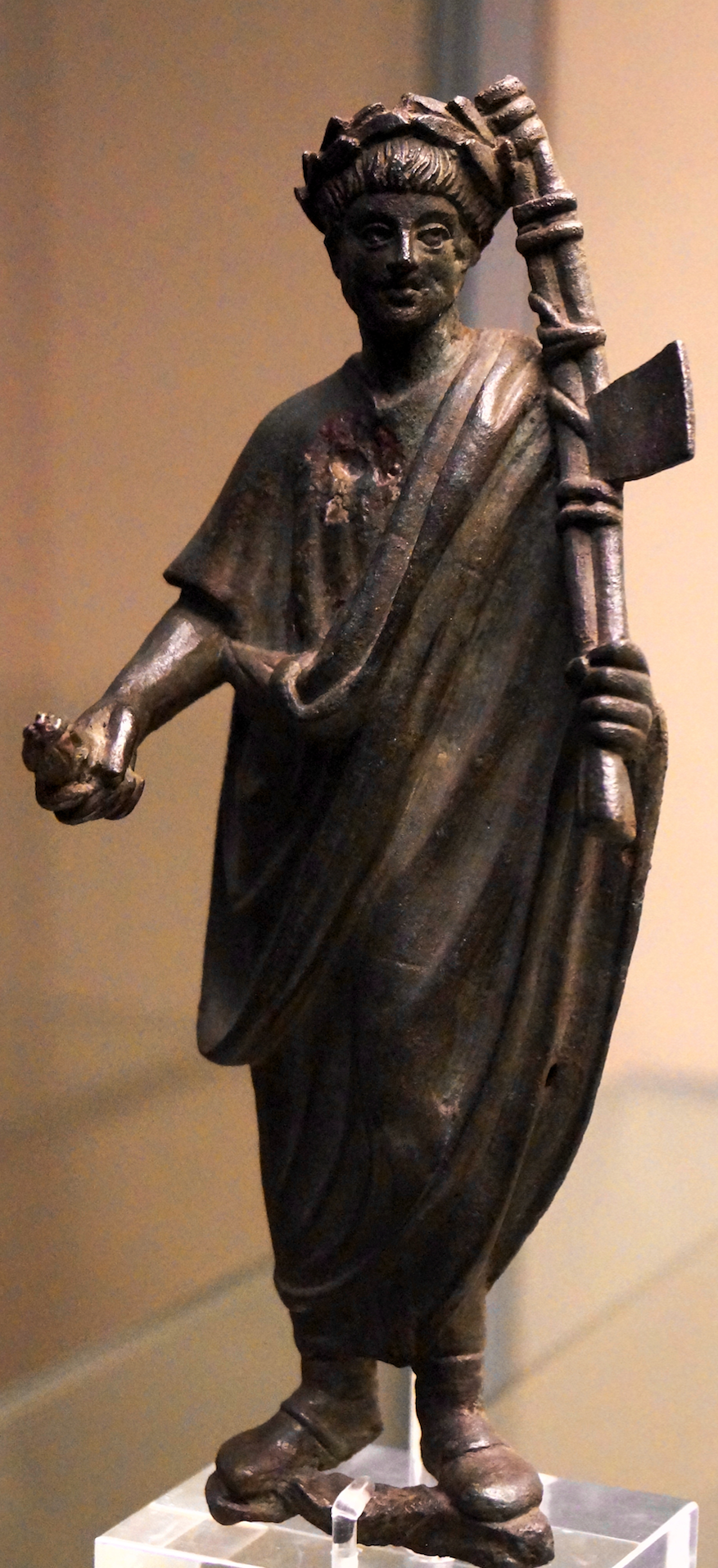
Bronze statuette of a Roman lictor carrying a fasces, 20 BC to 20 AD

A lictor (possibly from Latin ligare, meaning 'to bind') was a Roman civil servant who was an attendant and bodyguard to a magistrate who held imperium. Roman records describe lictors as having existed since the Roman Kingdom, and they may have originated with the Etruscans.

== Origin ==
The lictors are said in the ancient antiquarian sources to go back to the regal period. There are two main traditions. The first is from Dionysius of Halicarnassus. He claimed that Etruscan envoys numbering twelve (one for each Etruscan city) gifted the king Lucius Tarquinius Priscus fasces – symbolising military leadership of the twelve Etruscan communities – on his accession. With the approval of the Senate, Tarquin then appointed twelve lictors to attend to him when exercising military and civil authority. The second is in Livy, which attributes the first lictors to the king Romulus. Livy also sides with an Etruscan origin, dismissing the variant story that Romulus appointed one lictor for each of the twelve birds that appeared to him in augury at the foundation of the city.

The word lictor likely originates from their role in corporal punishment, where a victim is bound (Latin: ligare) for punishment. Ancient sources also offer two other possibilities: from the belt or apron (licium and limus, respectively) that they wore or, less plausibly, via borrowing from a supposed Greek cognate. Modern scholars have also suggested the possibility of derivation from licere ("to be allowed").

== Eligibility ==
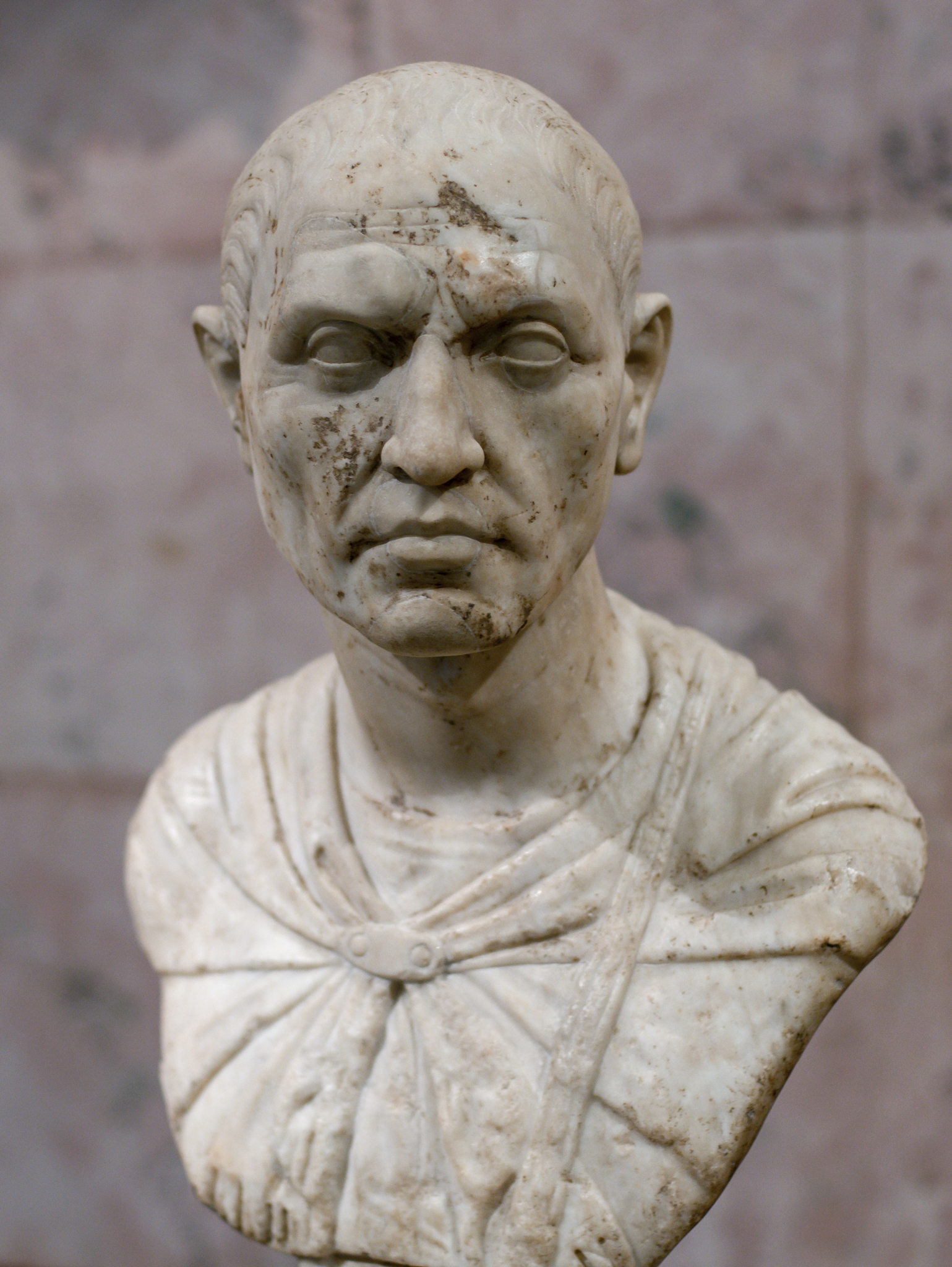
Bust of a 2nd-century lictor most likely wearing a paenula, a type of cloak

Lictors were drawn from the plebeians and, in elite literature, were generally depicted as being drawn from low status. They were, however, all citizens.

Centurions from the legions were also automatically eligible to become lictors on retirement from the army. A lictor had to be a strongly built man, capable of physical work. Lictors were exempted from military service, received a fixed salary (of 600 sestertii, in the beginning of the Empire), and were organized in a corporation. Usually, they were personally chosen by the magistrate they were supposed to serve, but it is also possible that they were drawn by lots.

== Tasks ==
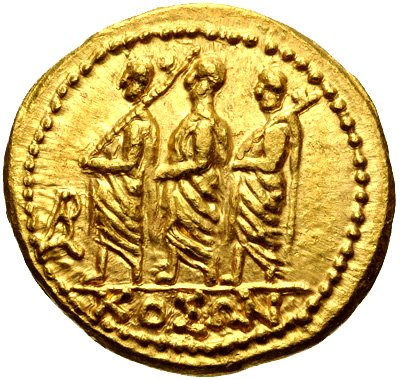
Gold coin from Dacia, minted by Coson, depicting a consul and two lictors

A lictor's main role was to bodyguard the imperium-possessing magistrate to which they were assigned. They also carried the magistrate's fasces which symbolised that magistrate's imperium. The fasces also served to intimidate a crowd since they contained all the necessary equipment to administer corporal and capital punishment. Stories going back to the origin of the republic attest to magistrates ordering their lictors to serve as executioners; their role in a magistrate's imposition of official punishment seems to have continued through to late antiquity.

The lictors followed or preceded the magistrate wherever he went, including the Forum, his house, temples, and the baths. Lictors were organized in an ordered line before him, with the primus lictor (lit. 'principal lictor') directly in front of him, waiting for orders. If there was a crowd, the lictors opened the way and kept their master safe, pushing all aside except for Roman matrons, who were accorded special honor. They also had to stand beside the magistrate whenever he addressed the crowd. Magistrates could only dispense with their lictors if they were visiting a free city or addressing a higher status magistrate. Lictors also had legal and penal duties; they could, at their master's command, arrest Roman citizens and punish them. A Vestal Virgin was accorded a lictor when her presence was required at a public ceremony.

The degree of magistrate's imperium was symbolised by the number of lictors escorting him:

- Dictator: 24 lictors
- Emperor: originally 12 lictors, after Domitian, 24 lictors
- Rex and Consul: 12 lictors
- Magister equitum: 6 lictors
- Praetor: 6 lictors, 2 within the pomerium
- Curule aediles: 2 lictors
- Quaestor: no lictors in the city of Rome, but quaestors were permitted to have fasces in the provinces.

During the late republic and the Principate, proconsuls and propraetors were assigned the same number of lictors as their urban counterparts. Proconsular governors, therefore, also had twelve lictors. However, the legati Augusti pro praetore were assigned only five.

Lictors assigned to magistrates were organized into a corporation composed of several decuries; during the late Republic, the decuries sometimes lent lictors to private citizens holding ludi publici (lit. 'public games') and traveling senators. However, these lictors probably did not carry fasces.

Lictors were also associated with comitia curiata, as in its later form, the thirty curiae were represented by a single lictor each.

== Lictor curiatus ==
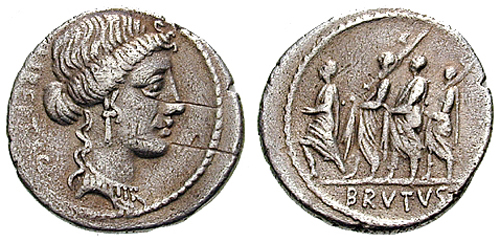
Head of Libertas on a denarius issued by Brutus, one of the assassins of Caesar, and on the reverse a consul flanked by two lictors

The lictor curiatus (pl.: lictores curiati) was a special kind of lictor who did not carry rods or fasces and whose main tasks were religious. There were approximately thirty of them, serving at the command of the pontifex maximus, the high priest of Rome. They were present at sacrifices where they carried or guided sacrificial animals to the altars. Vestal Virgins, flamines (lit. 'priests'), and other high-ranking priests were entitled to be escorted and protected by lictores curiati. In the Empire, women of the imperial family were usually followed by two of this kind of lictor. The lictores curiati were also responsible to summon the Comitia Curiata (lit. 'Public Assembly') and to maintain order during its procedures.

== See also ==
- Cursus honorum
- Praetorian Guard

== Bibliography ==
- Brennan, T. Corey (2023). The fasces: a history of Ancient Rome's most dangerous political symbol. Oxford University Press. ISBN 978-0-19-764490-4.
- Chisholm, Hugh, ed. (1911). "Lictors" . Encyclopædia Britannica. Vol. 16 (11th ed.). Cambridge University Press. p. 588.
- Hornblower, Simon; Spawforth, Antony; Eidinow, Esther, eds. (2012). The Oxford classical dictionary (4th ed.). Oxford University Press. doi:10.1093/acrefore/9780199381135.013.3709. ISBN 978-0-19-954556-8. OCLC 959667246.
  - Drummond, Andrew. "fasces". In OCD^{4} (2012).
  - Staveley, Eastland Stuart; Lintott, Andrew. "lictores". In OCD^{4} (2012).
- Smith, William, ed. (1875). "Fasces". A Dictionary of Greek and Roman Antiquities. London: John Murray. pp. 520–21.
- Wilson, Mark B (2021). Dictator: the evolution of the Roman dictatorship. Ann Arbor: University of Michigan Press. ISBN 978-0-472-13266-9.
