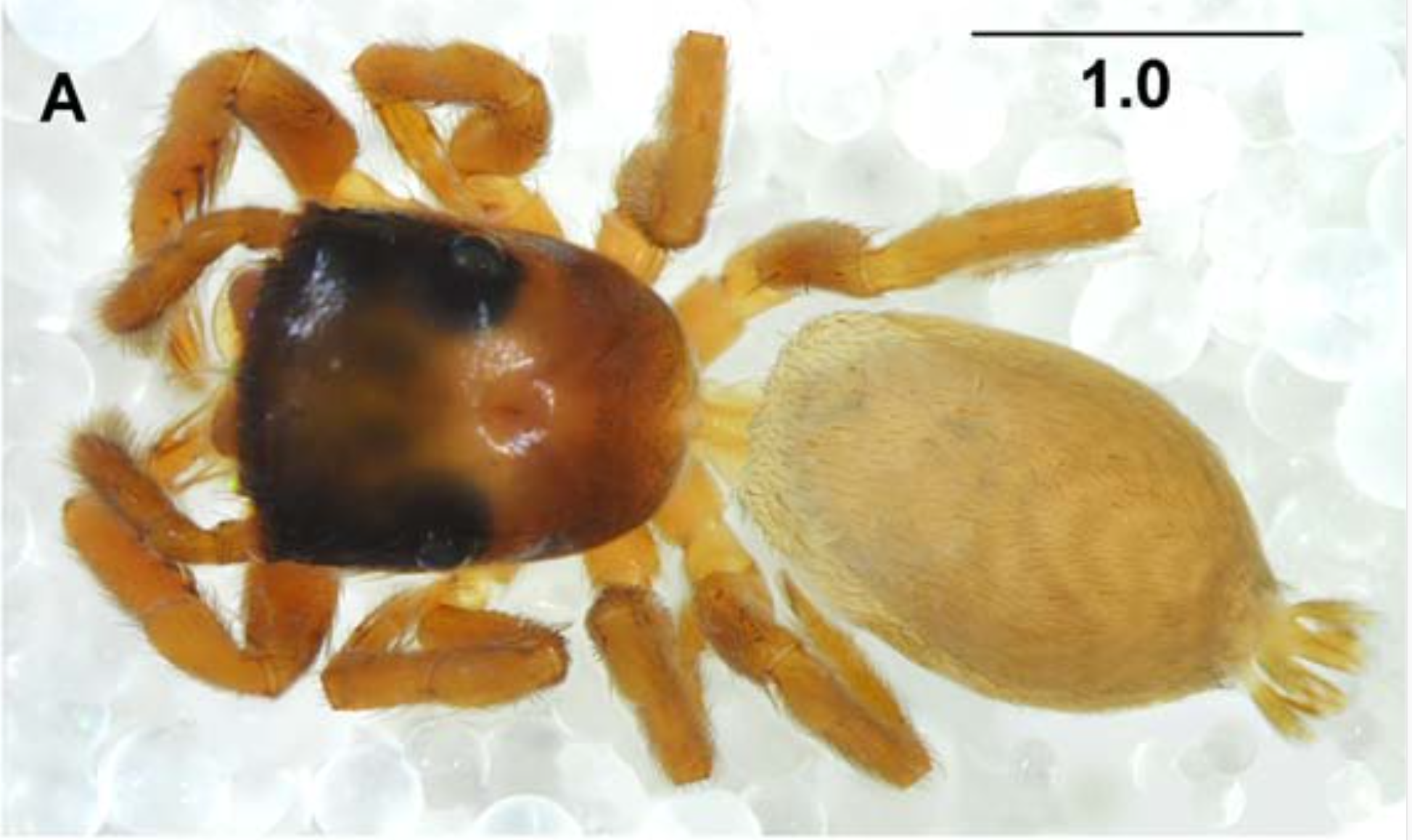
- Female Detalik cavally

Scientific classification
- Kingdom: Animalia
- Phylum: Arthropoda
- Subphylum: Chelicerata
- Class: Arachnida
- Order: Araneae
- Infraorder: Araneomorphae
- Family: Salticidae
- Subfamily: Salticinae
- Genus: Detalik; Wesołowska, 2021

Type species
- D. anthonyi Wesołowska, 2021

Species
- Detalik anthonyi (type); Detalik cavally; Detalik ibadan; Detalik idanrensis

= Detalik =

Genus of spiders

Detalik is a genus of jumping spiders (family Salticidae), consisting of four species. The genus was circumscribed in 2021 by Wanda Wesołowska, along with descriptions of the type species Detalik anthonyi and two other species. These were all found in Nigeria, although another species described in 2022 lives in Ivory Coast. Generally, the members of the genus are very small spiders, between 3.5 and 5 mm (0.14 and 0.20 in) long. They have distinctive features in their mouthparts, including a short fang on their jaws, or chelicerae, along with two small teeth to the front and a large tooth to the back. The upper part of their body, the carapace, is noticeable for its almost vertical sloping back and the front legs are characterised by very long spikes on the tibia and metatarsus. While each species has unique reproductive organs, there are some common features: males have a spike at the back of a structure used during mating (the palpal bulb) while females have their reproductive openings hidden in a small indentation in the visible part of their copulatory organs, the epigyne.

== Taxonomy ==
=== History ===
Detalik is a genus of jumping spiders, a member of the family Salticidae, that was circumscribed by the Polish arachnologist Wanda Wesołowska in 2021. It was one of 47 new genera that she circumscribed during her career, a number only surpassed by the French arachnologist Eugène Simon. She named the genus after the Polish word detalik, which means 'a fine detail'.

The holotype for the type species was found near Ibadan in Oyo State, Nigeria, in 1974. Other examples have been identified in Cross River and Kwara State. These were all described in 2021, along with other members of the genus identified in the country, including on the Idanre Hills in Ondo State, after which the species Detalik idanrensis is named.

Detalik is a member of the subtribe Thiratoscirtina, a grouping of African jumping spiders known for their distinctive leg spines and complex mating structures.. First identified by Wayne Maddison and Melissa Bodner in 2012, Thiratoscirtina is endemic to Africa and is one of the most diverse of all the salticid lines. In 2017, Jerzy Prószyński identified a group of closely related spider genera, known as Thiratoscirtines, which largely overlap with the subtribe Thiratoscirtina. Wesołowska has described a large proportion of the genera and species in the subtribe. Other genera include Ajaraneola, Pochytoides and Ragatinus. It is a member of the subtribe Aelurillina in the tribe Aelurillini in the subclade Simonida in the clade Saltafresia in the subfamily Salticinae. The subfamily is a member of the family Salticidae. The genus is closely related to the genus Malizna, circumscribed by Wesołowska at the same time.

=== Phylogeny ===
Cladogram of Salticidae depicting the internal phylogenetic structure of the clade Saltafresia and the relationships among several genera, including Detalik; based on the 2015 work of Maddison.

- Salticidae
  - Hisponinae
  - - Salticinae
      Amycoida
    - - Salticoida
        Astioida
      - Marpissoida
      - - Saltafresia
          - Simonida
            - Aelurillinae
              - Aelurillini
                Ajaraneola
              - Alfenus
              - Bacelarella
              - Cembalea
              - Detalik
              - Gramenca
              - Lamottella
              - Longarenus
              - Malloneta
              - Malizna
              - Nimbarus
              - Pochyta
              - Saraina
              - Tarne
              - Thiratoscirtus
              - Ureta
            - Freyina
            - Thiratoscirtina
          - Euophryini
          - Leptorchestini
          - Plexippini
          - Salticini

== Description ==
All Detalik spiders are very small, with a body length between 3.5 and 5 mm (0.14 and 0.20 in). Similar to other jumping spiders, they have a body that is divided into two main parts: the cephalothorax and the abdomen. The carapace, the hard upper part of the cephalothorax, is high with an almost vertical sloping back. It is generally brown with a darker eye field. The spider's front eyes are characteristically larger than the others. The mouthparts are distinctive with a short fang visible on the chelicerae, or spider's jaws, which have a two small teeth to the front and a large tooth to the back. The front legs are characterised with very long spikes, eight in pairs on the tibia and two on the metatarsus. The abdomen differs between the different species.

The copulatory organs are unique to each species, but have some common characteristics. There are large hairs on the female pedipalp, while the female copulatory organs are hidden in a depression in the epigyne. The males have a spike towards the back of the palpal bulb, or retromarginal apophysis, and a single medium-sized, pointed tibial apophysis, or spike on the palpal tibia.

The genus is similar to Malizna, but the two genera can be told apart on close examination. Female Detalik spiders have one long hair on their palpal tarsus, while the other genus has, unusually, two. The male can be most clearly identified by the presence of the retromarginal apophysis.

== Species ==
The genus contains four species:

- Detalik anthonyi Wesołowska, 2021
- Detalik cavally Wesołowska & Russell-Smith, 2022
- Detalik ibadan Wesołowska, 2021
- Detalik idanrensis Wesołowska, 2021

The type species is Detalik anthonyi, first described at the same time as the genus. It can be identified by its copulatory organs. The male has an irregular-shaped palpal bulb, a structure used during mating, with a large sickle-shaped spike towards the back, or retromarginal apophysis, and a very short embolus that emanates from the top. The tegulum has a short and blunt apophysis. While the hairy palpal tibia has a single short spike, or tibial apophysis. The female has copulatory openings to the sides of the epigyne, the visible external part of the copulatory organs, and particularly long insemination ducts that lead to the spherical spermathecae or receptacles.

The other species have distinctive patterns on their abdomens. Detalik anthonyi has a light serrated streak running down an otherwise greyish-beige top to it while the underside is yellowish. Detalik cavally has traces of chevrons on its greyish-beige surface. Detalik ibadan and Detalik idanrensis are brownish on top. They also most clearly distinguished by their copulatory organs. Detalik cavally can be identified by its small epigyne, which has copulatory openings more towards the back of the spider than other species. The male Detalik ibadan has a thinner and more pointed retrolateral apophysis than other spiders in the genus. The female Detalik idanrensis has straight insemination ducts.

== Distribution and habitat ==
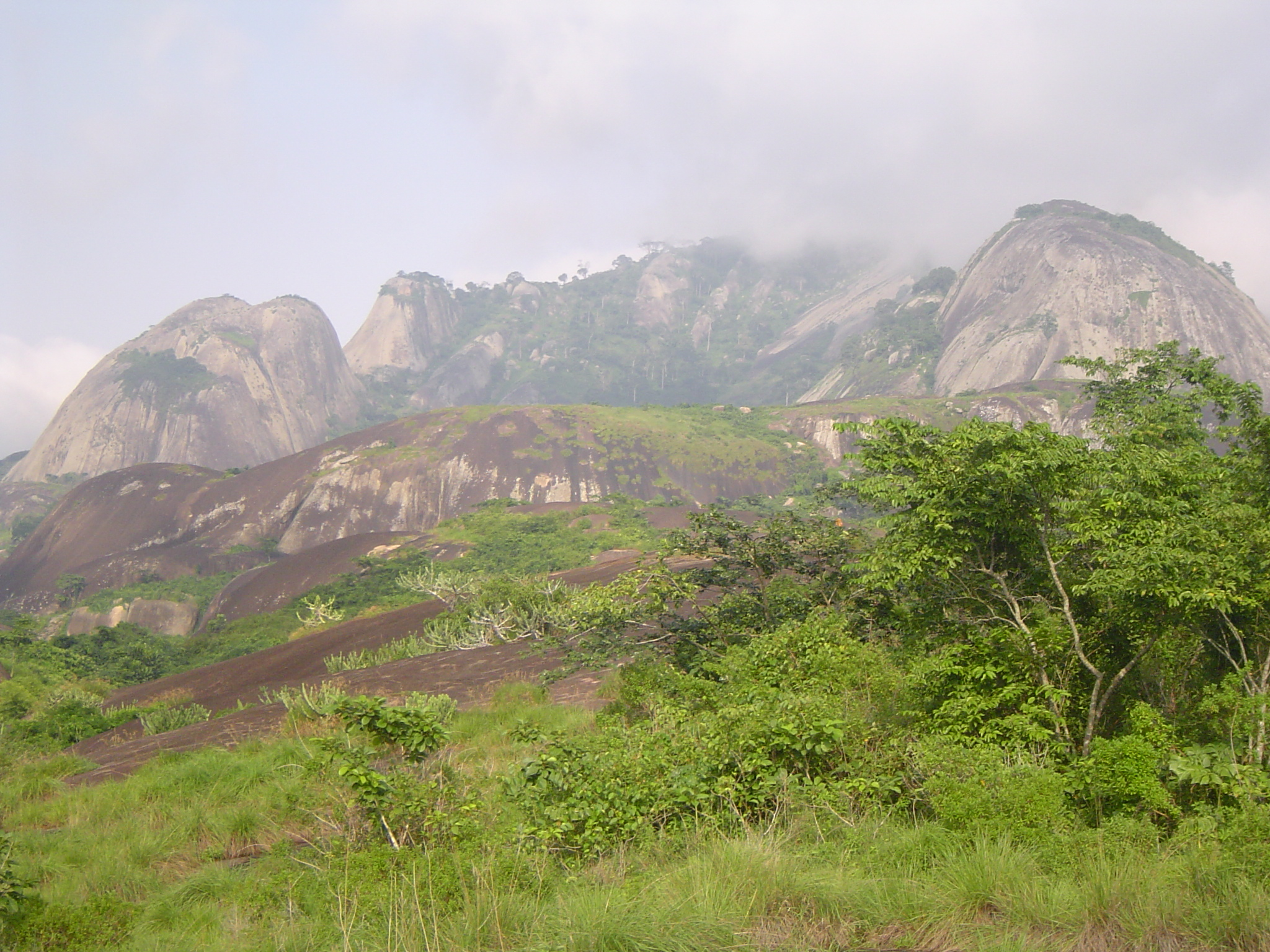
The Idanre Hills, home to Detalik idanrensis

Detalik spiders are endemic to Africa. The first examples to be described were found in Nigeria in 1974 and described in 2021. The species Detalik anthonyi Detalik ibadan and Detalik idanrensis are endemic to the country. The first to be found outside Nigeria was the holotype for Detalik cavally collected in Ivory Coast in 1975 and described in 2022. The spiders thrive in woodland environments, both fallow bush and secondary forests, and to find a home in woodland near to rivers, including areas where bamboo can be found growing wild. The spider also lives in areas of human habitation and has been found in areas where maize is cultivated.

== See also ==
- List of Salticidae genera
