= Detalik idanrensis =

Scientific classification
- Kingdom: Animalia
- Phylum: Arthropoda
- Subphylum: Chelicerata
- Class: Arachnida
- Order: Araneae
- Infraorder: Araneomorphae
- Family: Salticidae
- Genus: Detalik
- Species: D. idanrensis

Binomial name
- Detalik idanrensis Wesołowska, 2021

Species of spider

Detalik idanrensis is a species of jumping spider in the genus Detalik. It is endemic to Nigeria and was first described in 2021 by Wanda Wesołowska. A small spider like all those in the genus, it has a cephalothorax measuring typically 1.9 mm (0.07 in) long and an abdomen typically 1.7 mm (0.07 in) long. The cephalothorax has a brown top, or carapace, with a thin lighter line running down it and a light brown underside, or sternum. The abdomen is yellow underneath and also brown on top with a lighter streak running down much of the surface. The spider has distinctive copulatory organs. The female has unusually large spermathecae, or receptacles. The male has not been described.

== Taxonomy ==
Detalik idanrensis is a species of jumping spider that was first described by Wanda Wesołowska in 2021. It was one of over 500 species identified by the Polish arachnologist during her career, making her one of the most prolific authors in the field. She allocated it to the genus Detalik that she circumscribed at the same time. The genus is named for a Polish word that means "a fine detail". The species is named after the location where it was first found.

Detalik is related to the genus Malizna, also first circumscribed by Wesołowska at the same time, differing in details. For example, the female spiders have one long hair on its palpal tarsus. The genus is a member of the subtribe Thiratoscirtina. First identified by Wayne Maddison and Melissa Bodner in 2012, the subtribe is endemic to Africa. It is a member of the tribe Aelurillini, in the subclade Simonida in the clade Saltafresia. In 2017, Jerzy Prószyński described a group of genera called Thiratoscirtines that overlapped with the subtribe. Wesołowska has been responsible for describing a large proportion of the genera and species in the subtribe. Other genera include Ajaraneola, Pochytoides and Ragatinus.

== Description ==
Like all members of the genus, Detalik idanrensis is very small. The spider's body is divided into two main parts: a rounded square cephalothorax and an oval abdomen. The female has a cephalothorax that is typically 1.9 mm (0.07 in) long and 1.5 mm (0.06 in) wide. The carapace, the hard upper part of the cephalothorax, is brown and covered in colourless hairs, with a thin lighter line running down the middle of the majority of the outer surface. The sternum, or underside, is light brown. The spider's eye field is darker, with long brown bristles around the eyes themselves. The mouthparts are distinctive with chelicerae that have a single tooth and light brown labium.

The female spider's abdomen is smaller than its carapace, measuring typically 1.7 mm (0.07 in) in length with a width of typically 1.4 mm (0.06 in). It is brown with a large yellowish stripe down the middle and a covering of brown hairs. The front has a denser amount of longer hairs while the underside is yellow. The spider has light forward and grey rearward spinnerets and light brown legs that have brown hairs. The pedipalp has some pronounced long bristles.

The copulatory organs are distinctive. The epigyne is rounded and has a small amount of sclerotization. The majority of its surface is relatively indistinct, the pockets on the epigastric furrow at the very rearmost edge of the epigyne being the most noticeable feature. There are two copulatory openings that lead via very thin straight insemination ducts to distinctively large spermathecae, or receptacles. It is the straight nature of the insemination ducts that most clearly distinguishes the species from the related Detalik anthonyi. The male has not been described.

== Distribution and habitat ==
Detalik spiders are endemic to Africa. Detalik idanrensis lives in Nigeria. The spider has been found living in primary forest in mountainous areas of Ondo State. The female holotype for the species was discovered at an altitude of 760 m (2,490 ft) above sea level on Idanre Hill in 1974.
