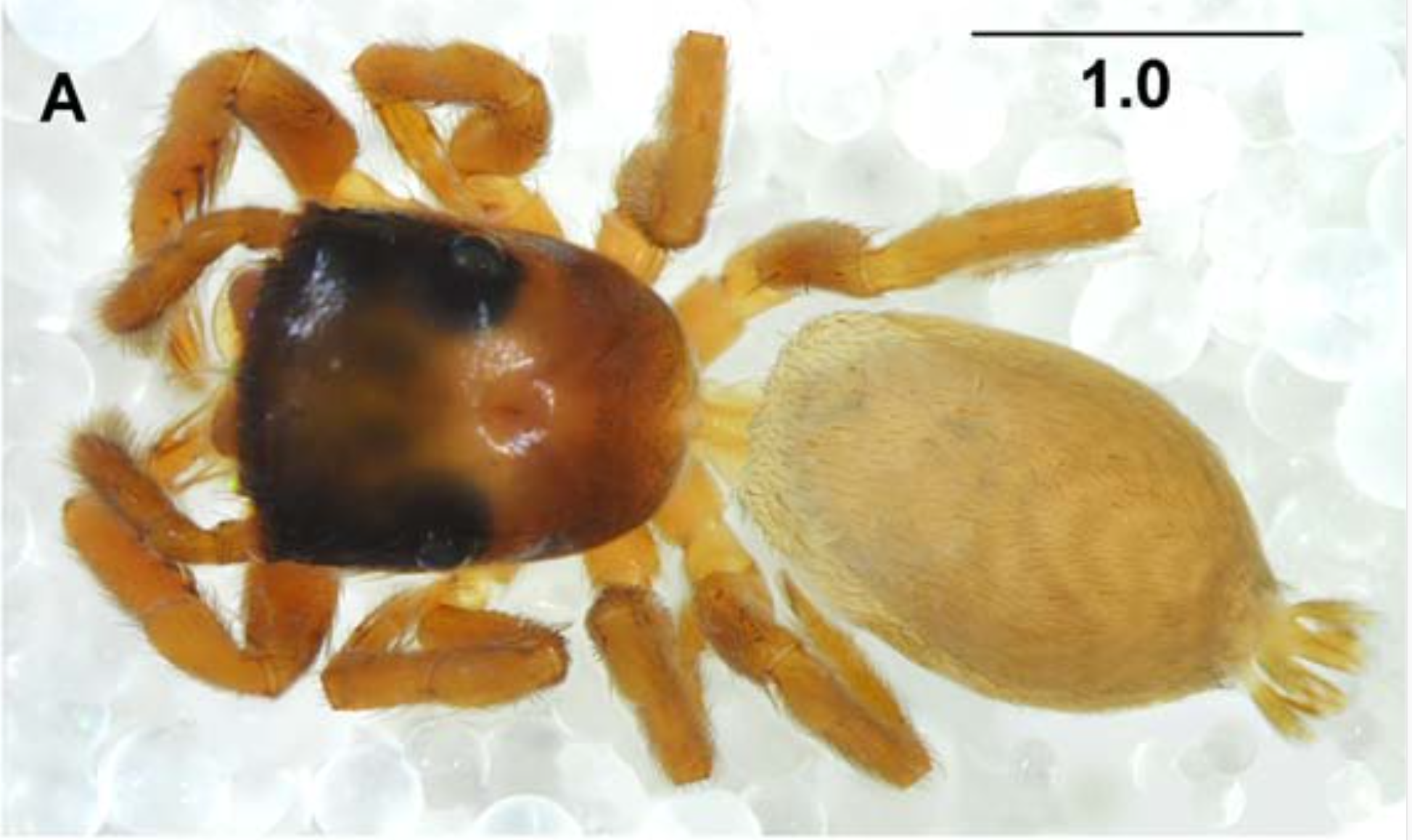

Scientific classification
- Kingdom: Animalia
- Phylum: Arthropoda
- Subphylum: Chelicerata
- Class: Arachnida
- Order: Araneae
- Infraorder: Araneomorphae
- Family: Salticidae
- Genus: Detalik
- Species: D. cavally

Binomial name
- Detalik cavally Wesołowska & Russell-Smith, 2022

= Detalik cavally =

Species of spider

Detalik cavally is a species of jumping spider in the genus Detalik, It is endemic to Ivory Coast and named after the forest in the Cavally Region of that country. The spider is small, with a cephalothorax that is typically 1.4 mm (0.06 in) long and an abdomen typically 1.6 mm (0.06 in). The spider has a blackish eye field, brown carapace, greyish-beige abdomen and brown legs. There is a vague marking of chevrons at the back of its abdomen and its chelicerae have a large tooth to the back and two small teeth to the front. The female has distinctive copulatory organs with two depressions divided by a ridge in the middle of its epigyne and enlarged spermathecae, or receptacles. The male has not been described. It was first described in 2022 by Wanda Wesołowska and Anthony Russell-Smith.

== Taxonomy ==
Detalik cavally is a species of jumping spider, a member of the family Salticidae, which was first described by Wanda Wesołowska and Anthony Russell-Smith in 2022. They allocated it to the genus Detalik, circumscribed by Wesołowska in 2021. The genus is named for a Polish word that means "a fine detail". The species is named after the place where it was first found.

The genus Detalik is related to the genus Malizna, also first circumscribed by Wesołowska at the same time, differing in details. For example, the female spiders have one long hair on its palpal tarsus. The genus is a member of the subtribe Thiratoscirtina. First identified by Wayne Maddison and Melissa Bodner in 2012, the subtribe is endemic to Africa. It is a member of the tribe Aelurillini, in the subclade Simonida in the clade Saltafresia. In 2017, Jerzy Prószyński described a group of genera called Thiratoscirtines that overlapped with the subtribe. Wesołowska has been responsible for describing a large proportion of the genera and species in the subtribe. Other genera include Ajaraneola, Pochytoides and Ragatinus.

== Description ==
Like all members of the genus, Detalik cavally is very small. The spider's body is divided into two main parts: a cephalothorax and an abdomen. The female has a cephalothorax that is typically 1.4 mm (0.06 in) long and 1.2 mm (0.05 in) wide. The carapace, the hard upper part of the cephalothorax, is brown, covered in colourless hairs. The sternum, or underside, is light brown. The spider's eye field is blackish, with long brown bristles around the eyes themselves. The central front row eyes are particularly large. The mouthparts are distinctive with chelicerae that have a large tooth to the back and two small teeth to the front. The mouthparts are light brown.

The spider's abdomen is an oval that is longer and narrower than its carapace, measuring typically 1.6 mm (0.06 in) long and 1.0 mm (0.04 in) wide. It is greyish-beige on top with a vague pattern of chevrons to the rear. It is covered in sparse brown hairs. The underside of the abdomen is lighter and the sides have delicate mottling. The spider has beige spinnerets,. The legs are brown with twelve spines on the forelegs. The pedipalps have a single spine on them. The copulatory organs are distinctive. The epigyne has a ridge running down the middle that is flanked by two shallow oval depressions. The thin insemination ducts lead to enlarged spermathecae, or receptacles. The male has not been described.

== Distribution ==
Detalik spiders are endemic to Africa. Detalik cavally lives in Ivory Coast. The female holotype for the species was found in Cavally Forest in the Cavally Region during 1975. The area is subject to encroachment from cocoa farmers.
