= Detalik ibadan =

Scientific classification
- Kingdom: Animalia
- Phylum: Arthropoda
- Subphylum: Chelicerata
- Class: Arachnida
- Order: Araneae
- Infraorder: Araneomorphae
- Family: Salticidae
- Genus: Detalik
- Species: D. ibadan

Binomial name
- Detalik ibadan Wesołowska, 2021

Species of spider

Detalik ibadan is a species of jumping spider in the genus Detalik. It is endemic to Nigeria and was first described in 2021 by Wanda Wesołowska. A small spider like all those in the genus, it has a cephalothorax measuring between 1.9 and 2.0 mm (0.07 and 0.08 in) long and an abdomen between 1.7 and 2.0 mm (0.07 and 0.08 in) long. The cephalothorax has a brown top, or carapace, that has white patches on its back and a light brown underside, or sternum. The spider's eyes are large and set on short tubercles, or nodules. The spider has distinctive copulatory organs. The male has an irregular-shaped palpal bulb with characteristic spikes, or apophyses. One, that is attached to the bulb itself, is large and sickle-shaped, the other short and sharp. The female has not been described.

== Taxonomy ==
Detalik ibadan is a species of jumping spider that was first described by Wanda Wesołowska in 2021. It was one of over 500 species identified by the Polish arachnologist during her career, making her one of the most prolific authors in the field. She allocated it to the genus Detalik that she circumscribed at the same time. The genus is named for a Polish word that means "a fine detail". The species is named after the location where it was first found.

Detalik is related to the genus Malizna, also first circumscribed by Wesołowska at the same time, differing in details. For example, the female spiders have one long hair on its palpal tarsus. The genus is a member of the subtribe Thiratoscirtina. First identified by Wayne Maddison and Melissa Bodner in 2012, the subtribe is endemic to Africa. It is a member of the tribe Aelurillini, in the subclade Simonida in the clade Saltafresia. In 2017, Jerzy Prószyński described a group of genera called Thiratoscirtines that overlapped with the subtribe. Wesołowska has been responsible for describing a large proportion of the genera and species in the subtribe. Other genera that are members include Ajaraneola, Pochytoides and Ragatinus.

== Description ==
Like all members of the genus, Detalik ibadan is very small. The spider's body is divided into two main parts: the cephalothorax and the abdomen. The male has a cephalothorax that is between 1.9 and 2.0 mm (0.07 and 0.08 in) long and 1.5 and 1.7 mm (0.06 and 0.07 in) wide. The carapace, the hard upper part of the cephalothorax, is high with a very sharply sloping, nearly vertical, back. It is brown, covered in colourless and white hairs, with large patches made of white hairs on its slopes and longer white hairs at the back edge. The sternum, or underside, is large and light brown with an almost straight front edge. The spider's eye field is darker, with long brown bristles and black areas around the eyes themselves. The eyes are very large and set on small nodules or tubercles. The spider's face, or clypeus, is very low and brown with a scattering of white hairs. The mouthparts are distinctive with long dark brown chelicerae that have a long tooth to the back and orange to light brown labium.

The male spider's abdomen is smaller than its carapace, measuring between 1.7 and 2.0 mm (0.07 and 0.08 in) in length with a width that varies between 1.4 and 1.5 mm (0.06 and 0.06 in). It is oval with a brownish top with light patches towards the front. There are a few yellow chevrons to the back. It is covered in short brown hairs with some brown bristles and longer white hairs to the front. The sides are lighter and the underside of the abdomen is yellow. The spider has dark spinnerets, the forward ones being longer and thinner, with darker bases. The legs are brown; the front pair are longer than the others. The pedipalps are light brown with a scattering of brown hairs.

The copulatory organs are distinctive. The male has a palpal bulb that is rounded with a very irregular baggy shape. It has a large sickle-shaped spike towards the back, or retromarginal apophysis, and a very short embolus that emanates from the top. It has a large curved spike towards the back of the cymbium, or retromarginal basal tutaculum. The palpal tibia has very long hairs and a single short curved spike, or tibial apophysis. It is design of the copulatory organs that helps determine the species from the related Detalik anthonyi. The male's thin and pointed tegular apophysis are the most distinguishing features for the species. The female has not been described.

== Distribution and habitat ==
Detalik spiders are endemic to Africa. Detalik ibadan lives in Nigeria. The male holotype for the species was found near Ibadan in Oyo State in 1974. Other examples have been identified living in the same area. The spider lives in woodland environments and seems to thrive in both secondary forests and to find a home in trees near to rivers. The spider has been discovered living alongside Detalik anthonyi and Malizna admirabilis.
