= Detalik anthonyi =

Scientific classification
- Kingdom: Animalia
- Phylum: Arthropoda
- Subphylum: Chelicerata
- Class: Arachnida
- Order: Araneae
- Infraorder: Araneomorphae
- Family: Salticidae
- Genus: Detalik
- Species: D. anthonyi

Binomial name
- Detalik anthonyi Wesołowska, 2021

Species of spider

Detalik anthonyi is the type species for the genus Detalik. It is a species of jumping spider that is endemic to Nigeria and was first described in 2021 by Wanda Wesołowska. A small spider like all those in the genus, it has a cephalothorax measuring between 1.7 and 2.2 mm (0.07 and 0.09 in) long and an abdomen between 1.5 and 2.7 mm (0.06 and 0.11 in) long. The cephalothorax has a brown top or carapace that has wide white stripes on its back and a yellow underside or sternum. The abdomen differs between the sexes. The female abdomen is brownish-grey with a lighter streak running down it while the male has a mosaic-like pattern of brown dots at the very rear. The spider has distinctive copulatory organs. The male has an irregular-shaped palpal bulb with characteristic spikes, or apophyses. One, that is attached to the bulb itself, is large and sickle-shaped; two others are much shorter. The female has copulatory openings to the sides of the epigyne that lead to particularly long insemination ducts.

== Taxonomy ==
Detalik anthonyi is a species of jumping spider that was first described by Wanda Wesołowska in 2021. It was one of over 500 species identified by the Polish arachnologist during her career, making her one of the most prolific authors in the field. She designated it the type species for the genus Detalik that she circumscribed at the same time. The genus is named for a Polish word that means "a fine detail". The species is named in honour of the English arachnologist Anthony Russell-Smith, who wrote extensively on African jumping spiders.

Detalik is related to the genus Malizna, also first circumscribed by Wesołowska at the same time, differing in details. For example, the female spiders have one long hair on its palpal tarsus. The genus is a member of the subtribe Thiratoscirtina. First identified by Wayne Maddison and Melissa Bodner in 2012, the subtribe is endemic to Africa. It is a member of the tribe Aelurillini, in the subclade Simonida in the clade Saltafresia. In 2017, Jerzy Prószyński described a group of genera called Thiratoscirtines that overlapped with the subtribe. Wesołowska has been responsible for describing a large proportion of the genera and species in the subtribe. Other genera include Ajaraneola, Pochytoides and Ragatinus.

== Description ==
Like all members of the genus, Detalik anthonyi is very small. The spider's body is divided into two main parts: the cephalothorax and the abdomen. The male has a cephalothorax that is between 1.8 and 2.1 mm (0.07 and 0.08 in) long and 1.4 and 1.7 mm (0.06 and 0.07 in) wide. The carapace, the hard upper part of the cephalothorax, is high with a sharply sloping back. It is brown, covered in colourless hairs, with wide stripes made of white hairs on its slopes. The sternum, or underside, is yellow with a hint of brown. The spider's eye field is darker, with long brown bristles and black rings around the eyes themselves. The central front row eyes are particularly large. The front eyes are surrounded by scales, while patches of white hairs can be seen on the edge of the eye field. White hairs can also be found on the spider's face or clypeus. The mouthparts are distinctive with brown chelicerae that have a large tooth to the back and dark brown labium.

The male spider's abdomen is smaller than its carapace, measuring between 1.5 and 2.0 mm (0.06 and 0.08 in) in length with a width that varies between 1.0 and 1.4 mm (0.04 and 0.06 in). It is greyish-beige on top with light serrated streak down the middle. The back part of the abdomen is darker than the front with a mosaic-like pattern of brown dots. It is covered in brown hairs, more densely to the froward edge. The underside of the abdomen is yellow. The spider has grey spinnerets, the forward ones being lighter. The legs are brown and yellow, with dark rings visible in the middle. They have very long hairs. The pedipalps are brownish with a scattering of white hairs visible. The copulatory organs are distinctive. The palpal bulb is rounded with a very irregular shape. It has a large sickle-shaped spike towards the back, or retromarginal apophysis, and a very short embolus that emanates from the top. There is a short and blunt apophysis on the part of the palpal bulb called the tegulum. The palpal tibia has very long hairs and a single short spike, or tibial apophysis.

The female is slightly larger than the male, with a cephalothorax that is between 1.7 and 2.2 mm (0.09 in) long and between 1.3 mm (0.05 in) and 1.7 mm wide and an abdomen that is between 1.7 and 2.7 mm (0.11 in) long and between 1.3 and 2.2 mm (0.09 in) wide. The carapace is similar to the male but has a yellow streak across much of the top apart from the eye field. The tooth is smaller than the male, more typical for the genus. The abdomen is brownish-grey with a lighter streak on its back. The streak has jagged edges. The spider's legs are yellowish-orange to brown. They have the same long hair as the male. The pedipalps are light.

The copulatory organs of the female are distinctive. The epigyne is rounded with a tongue-like structure to the rear. There is a central shallow depression and long pouches in the epigastric fold at the very back of the epigyne. The copulatory openings are to the sides and lead to long insemination ducts that curve inwards to the spherical spermathecae or receptacles. It is design of the copulatory organs that helps determine the species from the related Detalik ibadan. The male 's wide and blunt tegular apophysis and the female's long insemination ducts are the most distinguishing features for the species.

== Distribution and habitat ==
Detalik spiders are endemic to Africa. Detalik anthonyi lives in Nigeria. The male holotype for the species was found near Ibadan in Oyo State in 1974. Other examples have been identified near Mokwa, Kwara State and in the Gambari Forest Reserve in the same year. It was subsequently observed living near Calabar in Cross River State in 1984.

The spider lives in woodland environments. It seems to thrive in both fallow bush and secondary forests, and to find a home in woodland near to rivers, including areas where bamboo can be found growing. The spider also lives in areas of human habitation and has been found in areas where maize is being grown.
