= Ragatinus maddisoni =

Scientific classification
- Kingdom: Animalia
- Phylum: Arthropoda
- Subphylum: Chelicerata
- Class: Arachnida
- Order: Araneae
- Infraorder: Araneomorphae
- Family: Salticidae
- Genus: Ragatinus
- Species: R. maddisoni

Binomial name
- Ragatinus maddisoni Dawidowicz & Wesołowska, 2016

Species of spider

Ragatinus maddisoni is the type species for the genus Ragatinus. It is a species of jumping spider that is endemic in Kenya, living in forested afromontane regions. First described in 2016 by Angelika Dawidowicz and Wanda Wesołowska, it is named after the arachnologist Wayne Maddison. The spider is medium-sized and generally light brown, with a cephalothorax that is between 2.0 and 3.0 mm (0.079 and 0.118 in) long and an abdomen between 2.2 and 4.0 mm (0.087 and 0.157 in) long. It has light brown legs, the foremost ones being longer and darker. The species is most easily distinguished from other spiders by its copulatory organs. The female has a triangular depression in the middle of its epigyne and the male has a protuberance with teeth attached to the base of its curved embolus.

== Taxonomy ==
Ragatinus maddisoni is a jumping spider that was first described by Angelika Dawidowicz and Wanda Wesołowska in 2016. It was one of over 500 species identified by the Polish arachnologist Wesołowska during her career. It was named the type species for a new genus Ragatinus, first described at the same time. The genus is named for the Ragati Forest on the slopes of Mount Kenya where the spider was first found. The species is named for the arachnologist Wayne Maddison. The genus is a member of the subtribe Thiratoscirtina, which Maddison himself was the first to describe only a short while before, noting that it was endemic to Africa. He listed it, which also includes the genera Ajaraneola and Cembalea, Gramenca and Lamottella, in the tribe Aelurillini, within the subclade Saltafresia in the clade Salticoida. In 2017, Jerzy Prószyński placed the species in a group of genera named Euodenines. It is related to the genus Macaroeris.

== Description ==
Ragatinus maddisoni is a medium-sized spider. The male has a cephalothorax that is between 2.0 and 3.0 mm (0.079 and 0.118 in) long and between 1.6 and 2.2 mm (0.063 and 0.087 in) wide. The high carapace is light brown with a lighter patch in the centre and a black stripe along the edges. It is covered with short colourless hairs and has white hairs forming streaks on the sides. The eye field is greyish-brown. Transparent scales surround the eyes. The clypeus is low and light brown, with long dense light hairs. The labium is dark brown. The chelicerae have two small teeth at the front, one at the back and a fang. The sternum is yellow and shaped like a shield. The ovoid abdomen measures between 2.3 and 3.5 mm (0.091 and 0.138 in) in length. It is light brown with white sides and a white chevron towards the rear. The underside is light marked with brown patches formed of brown patches. The spinnerets are greyish-brown. The spider has light brown legs, some with dark rings, with brown hairs. The front legs are the darkest and longest. The pedipalps have a single tibial apophysis and two teeth on a large triangular appendage found at the base of the embolus.

The female is similar in size to the male, with a cephalothorax that measures between 2.0 and 2.7 mm (0.079 and 0.106 in) in length and between 1.4 and 2.1 mm (0.055 and 0.083 in) in width. The abdomen ranges between 2.2 and 4.0 mm (0.087 and 0.157 in) in length. The carapace is slightly lighter. The pedipalp tarsus has a single long spine running down the middle. The epigyne has a distinctive triangular depression and deep pockets that conceal the copulatory openings. The seminal ducts curve in the middle and lead the ovoid spermathecae. The copulatory organs are unique. The depression in the epigyne and the shape of the appendage at the base of coiled embolus help differentiate the species from other related spiders.

== Distribution and habitat ==
Almost all, if not all, Ragatinus spiders live in sub-Saharan Africa. Ragatinus maddisoni is endemic to Kenya, around Mount Kenya and in the Aberdare Range. The holotype was discovered in 1969 in the Ragati Forest near Mount Kenya at an altitude of 2,000 m (6,600 ft) above sea level. Other examples have been found at the nearby station in Kabaru Forest and the Teleki Valley, as well as near Kabage in the Aberdare Range.

The species lives in afromontane regions. Specimens have been found in plant litter, amongst moss and on grass tussocks in forests of bamboo, Lobelia, Podocarpus and rosewood. Ragatinus maddisoni has been found at altitudes up to 3,080 m (10,100 ft) above sea level.
