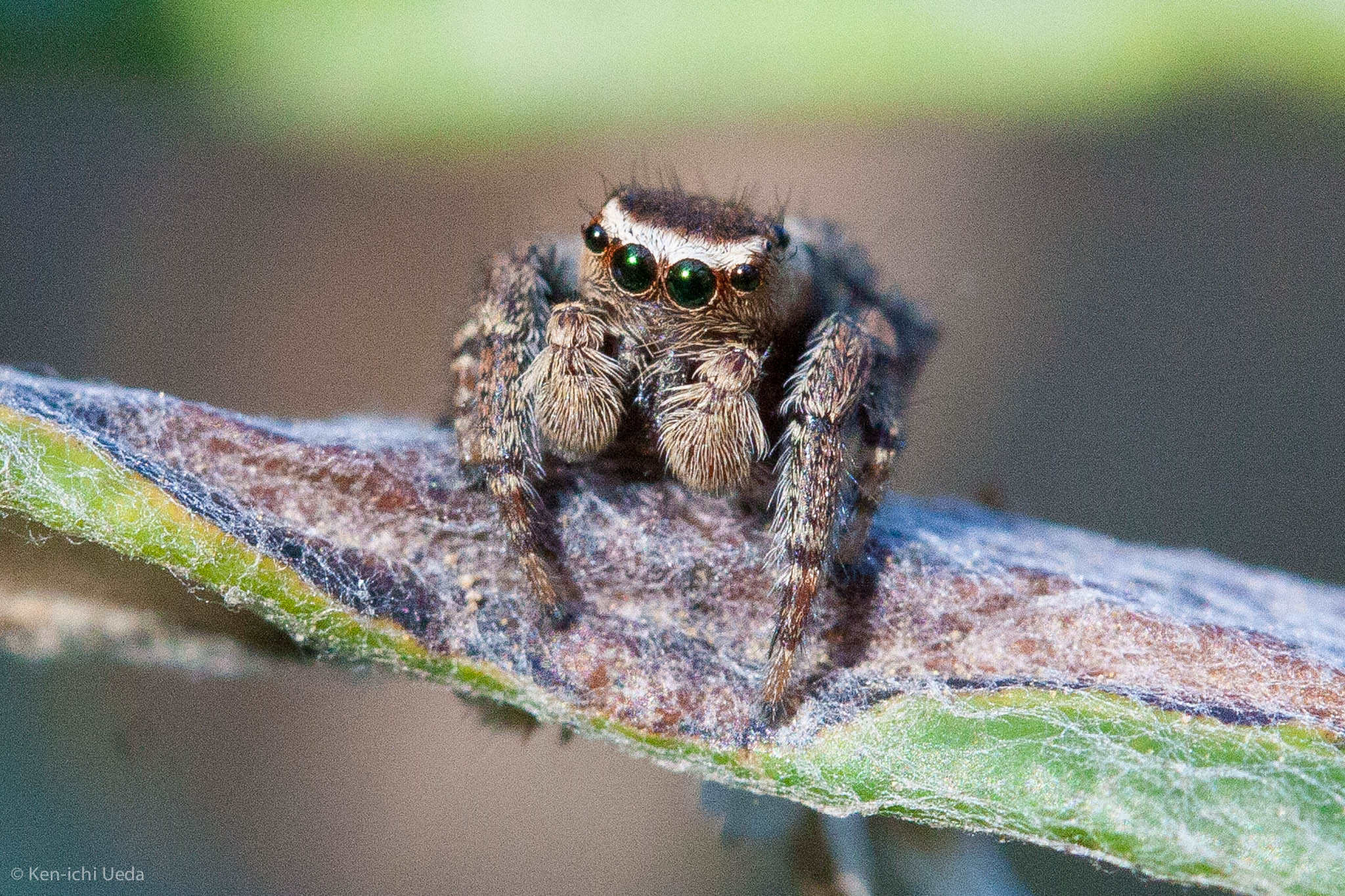
- The related Evarcha proszynskii

Scientific classification
- Kingdom: Animalia
- Phylum: Arthropoda
- Subphylum: Chelicerata
- Class: Arachnida
- Order: Araneae
- Infraorder: Araneomorphae
- Family: Salticidae
- Genus: Evarcha
- Species: E. idanrensis

Binomial name
- Evarcha idanrensis Wesołowska & Russell-Smith, 2011

= Evarcha idanrensis =

Species of spider

Evarcha idanrensis is a species of jumping spider in the genus Evarcha that lives in Nigeria. It is named after Idanre Hill in Ondo State, where it was first found. The species was first described in 2011 by Wanda Wesołowska and Anthony Russell-Smith. The spider is hard to distinguish from other spiders in the genus. It has a cephalothorax measuring between 2.1 and 2.5 mm (0.08 and 0.10 in) long and an abdomen between 2.2 and 3.5 mm (0.09 and 0.14 in) long. It has a yellow carapace with a black eye field and light brown legs. The abdomen is brownish-grey with an indistinct pattern on its back. Apart from the size of the epigyne, the female's copulatory organs are similar to other members of the genus. The male has not been described.

== Taxonomy ==
Evarcha idanrensis is a species of jumping spider that was first described by Wanda Wesołowska and Anthony Russell-Smith in 2011. It was one of over 500 species identified by the Polish arachnologist Wesołowska during her career, making her one of the most prolific scientists in the field. They allocated it to the genus Evarcha, first circumscribed by Eugène Simon in 1902. The genus is one of the largest genera of jumping spiders, with members found on four continents.

In 1976, Jerzy Prószyński placed the genus in the subfamily Pelleninae of the family Plexippoida, along with the genera Bianor and Pellenes. In Wayne Maddison's 2015 study of spider phylogenetic classification, the genus Evarcha was moved to the subtribe Plexippina. This is a member of the tribe Plexippini, in the subclade Simonida in the clade Saltafresia. It is closer to the genera Hyllus and Plexippus. Analysis of protein-coding genes showed it was particularly related to Telamonia. In the following year, Prószyński added the genus to a group of genera named Evarchines, named after the genus, along with Hasarinella and Nigorella based on similarities in the spiders' copulatory organs. The species is named the Idanre Hill where the first examples were found.

== Description ==
Evarcha idanrensis has a body that is divided into two main parts: a cephalothorax and an abdomen. The female has a cephalothorax that is between 2.1 and 2.5 mm (0.08 and 0.10 in) long and 1.6 and 1.8 mm (0.06 and 0.07 in) wide. The carapace, the hard upper part of the cephalothorax, is moderately high. The top is brown covered with brownish hairs. It has a black eye field with longer bristles near the eyes themselves. Light hairs encircle the central eyes. The sides are darker with lighter hairs. The underside, or sternum, is yellow. The spider's face, or clypeus, is low and yellowish. The spider's mouthparts are typical for the genus, including its brown chelicerae and its labium, that is light brown with lighter tips.

The spider's abdomen is larger than the carapace, measuring between 2.2 and 3.5 mm (0.09 and 0.14 in) in length and 1.5 and 2.5 mm (0.06 and 0.10 in) in width. The top is brownish-grey with an indistinct pattern of dark patches and chevrons typical of the genus, covered with long thin translucent hairs. The underside is grey marked with four rows of light dots. The spider's spinnerets are yellowish-grey. It has generally light brown legs with occasional darker patches. They have brown hairs and long spines. The spider's copulatory organs are similar to others in the genus, particularly internally, except it has a smaller epigyne. It has a central depression with copulatory openings that lead to slightly sclerotized insemination ducts and complex many-chambered spermathecae. The male has not been described.

== Distribution and habitat ==
Evarcha spiders live across the world, although those found in North America may be accidental migrants. Although the genus is found across Africa, Evarcha idanrensis is endemic to Nigeria. The holotype was collected on Idanre Hill in Ondo State at an altitude of 700 m (2,300 ft) above sea level in 1974. Other examples have been found in other areas of Nigeria, including Kwara State near the town of Mokwa. The spider lives in savanna, particularly amongst sedges of the genus Trilepis.
