= Lamottella proszynskii =

Scientific classification
- Kingdom: Animalia
- Phylum: Arthropoda
- Subphylum: Chelicerata
- Class: Arachnida
- Order: Araneae
- Infraorder: Araneomorphae
- Family: Salticidae
- Genus: Lamottella
- Species: L. proszynskii

Binomial name
- Lamottella proszynskii Wawer & Wesołowska, 2024

Species of jumping spider

Lamottella proszynskii is a species of jumping spider in the genus Lamottella that lives in Ghana.
