= Saraina rubrofasciata =

Scientific classification
- Kingdom: Animalia
- Phylum: Arthropoda
- Subphylum: Chelicerata
- Class: Arachnida
- Order: Araneae
- Infraorder: Araneomorphae
- Family: Salticidae
- Genus: Saraina
- Species: S. rubrofasciata

Binomial name
- Saraina rubrofasciata Wanless & Clark, 1975

Species of spider

Saraina rubrofasciata is a species of spider in the family Salticidae found in West Africa (Ivory Coast, Cameroon and Nigeria).
