= Idanre =

Idanre Ùdàn'è Ufẹ̀ Òkè
- LGA and Town
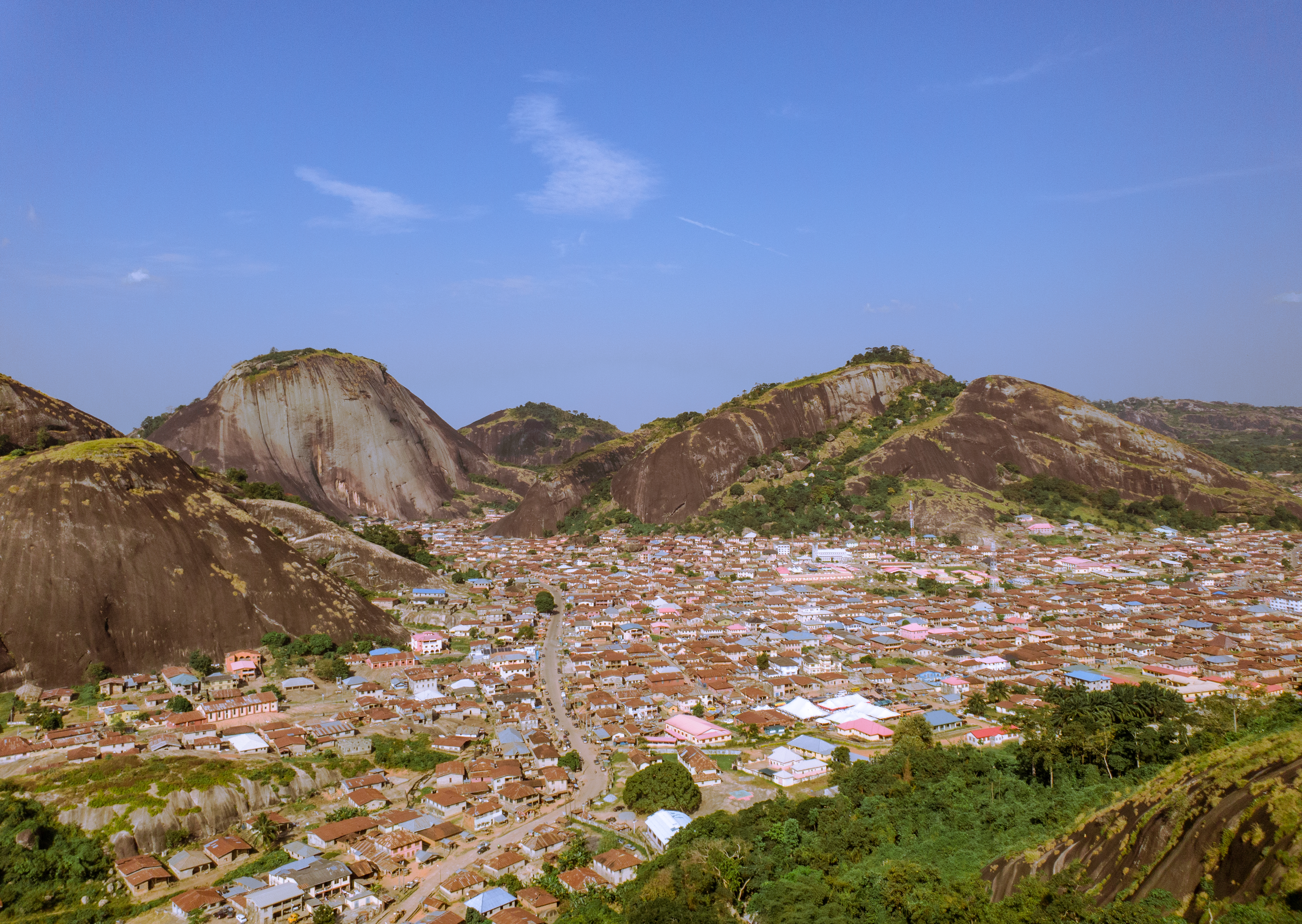
- View of Idanre Town from Idanre Hill
- Interactive map of Idanre
- Location in Nigeria
- Coordinates: 7°05′32″N 5°07′56″E
- Country: Nigeria
- State: Ondo

Area
  - Land: 1,543.4 km^{2} (595.9 sq mi)

Population (2006)
  - Total: 129,795
  - Density: 84.097/km^{2} (217.81/sq mi)
- Time zone: UTC+1 (WAT)

Idanre, known formerly as Ufẹ̀ Òkè is a historic town in Ondo State, and the headquarters of the Idanre Local Government Area which carries its name. The town is located at the foot of the scenic Idanre Hill which is of unique cultural and environmental significance, and attracts many tourists.

The town is about 20 km (12 mi) southeast of the state's capital Akure, it has an area of 1,543.4 km^{2} (595.9 mi^{2}) and a population of 129,795 as of the 2006 census. The postal code of the area is 340. Idanre is Nigeria's largest cocoa producing area. The residents of Idanre are mainly a Yoruba speaking people (with a tongue similar to the Ondo dialect). A majority of its people are into farming and trading.

== History ==
Ufe Oke was founded by Olofen Aremitan from the Oduduwa royal household who was said to have left Ife with his band of followers with an item of inestimable value, a brass crown (Ade Ude). Idanre is made up of three disjointed township or localities, namely; Atosin, Alade and Odode (Ode Idanre). Although Ode Idanre is the major township with more populace and land area than the other two smaller localities, the others have always been recognized by the inhabitants independently. The Idanre hill, or Oke Idanre is located in Idanre town in Ondo State of southwestern Nigeria. It was in these hills that the people of Ufe oke (Ife of the mountains) lived for more than eight hundred years before they finally descended into the plains in the year 1923. The old site still remains in the hills, accessible through a 660 step ascent that leads up into the hills.

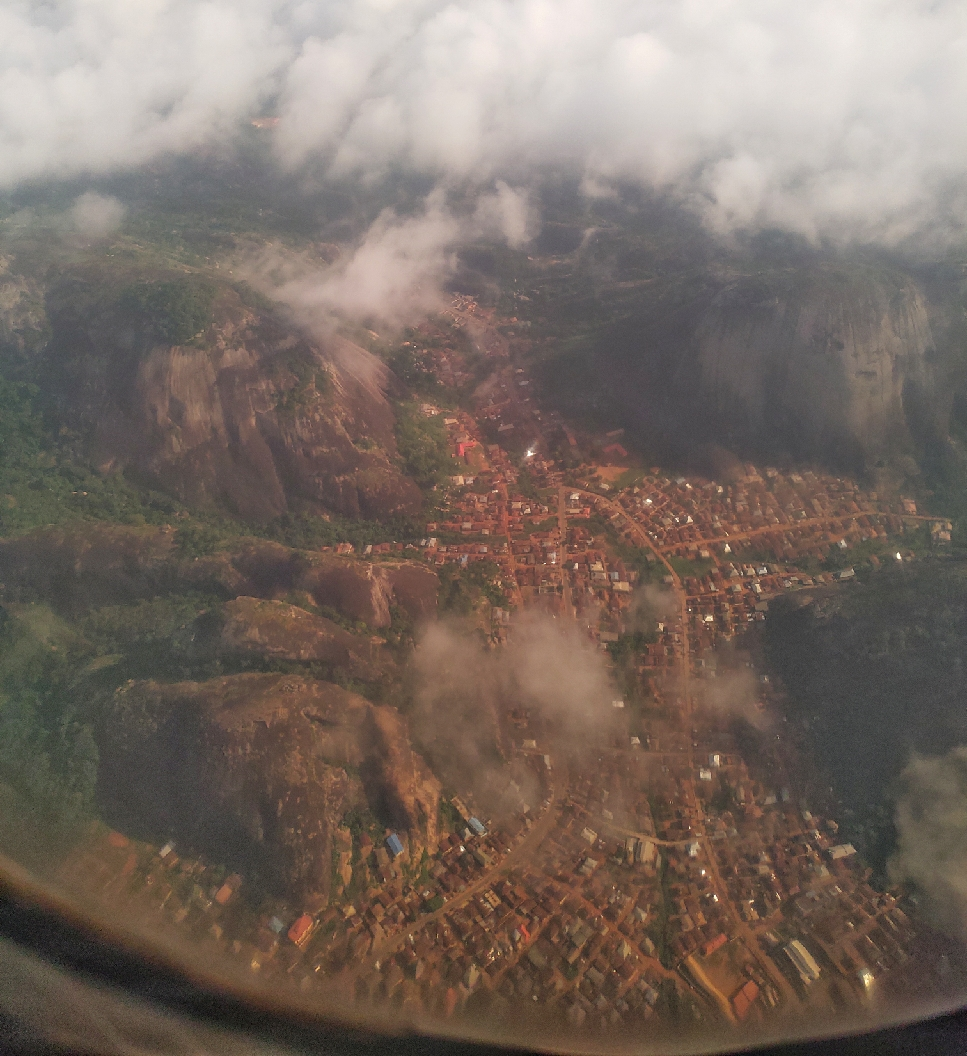
Aerial view of Idanre hills

== Site description ==
A short oral history of Idanre in Ùdàn'è dialect by a native speaker

The hill of Idanre is considered to be one of the most beautiful natural landforms in Nigeria. It consists of cultural sites as the Owa's Palace, shrines, Old Court, Belfry, Agbooogun Footprint, Thunder Water (Omi Apaara) and burial mounds and grounds. It resides 910 m (3,000 ft) above sea level and houses a unique ecosystem upon which the cultural landscape has integrated. A great tree called the Iraye Tree is situated at the entrance of the ancient city.

=== World Heritage status ===
This site was added to the UNESCO World Heritage Tentative List on October 8, 2007, in the Cultural category.

=== Wildlife ===
Amietophrynus perreti, or the Perret's toad, is only known from a single locality at the Idanre Hill. The five sites where forest elephants are found in southern Nigeria are the Omo Forests in Ogun State, the Okomu National Park in Edo State, the Cross River National Park in Cross River State, the IDANRE FORESTS and Osse River Park in Ondo State and the Andoni Island in Rivers State. [Nigerian Conservation Foundation (NCF)]

== Climate ==
Idanre features a tropical monsoon-influenced savanna climate with abundant rainfall from April to October, enhanced by its hilly terrain. The dry season from November to March has warm temperatures and reduced cloud cover.

=== Wind ===
The average wind speed is 1.5 metres per second (3.4 miles per hour; 4.9 feet per second).

=== Humidity ===
The month with the fewest muggy days in Idanre is January, with 17 days that are muggy or worse.
