= Pochytoides lamottei =

Scientific classification
- Kingdom: Animalia
- Phylum: Arthropoda
- Subphylum: Chelicerata
- Class: Arachnida
- Order: Araneae
- Infraorder: Araneomorphae
- Family: Salticidae
- Genus: Pochytoides
- Species: P. lamottei

Binomial name
- Pochytoides lamottei (Wesołowska, 2018)

Species of spider

Pochytoides lamottei is a species of jumping spider in the family Salticidae. It is found in Guinea.
