= Idanre Forest Reserve =

- IUCN category III (natural monument or feature)
- Location within Nigeria
- Location: Idanre, Ondo, Nigeria
- Nearest city: Omifunfun
- Coordinates: 6.857787°N 5.105558°E
- Area: 561 square kilometres (217 sq mi)
- World Heritage site: Designated

Idanre Forest Reserve is in Idanre local government area of the Nigerian state of Ondo, in the south-west part of the country. This International Union for Conservation of Nature designated nature reserve covers 561 square kilometres (217 sq mi).

It is a lowland rainforest with an altitude of 10 to 400 meters.
