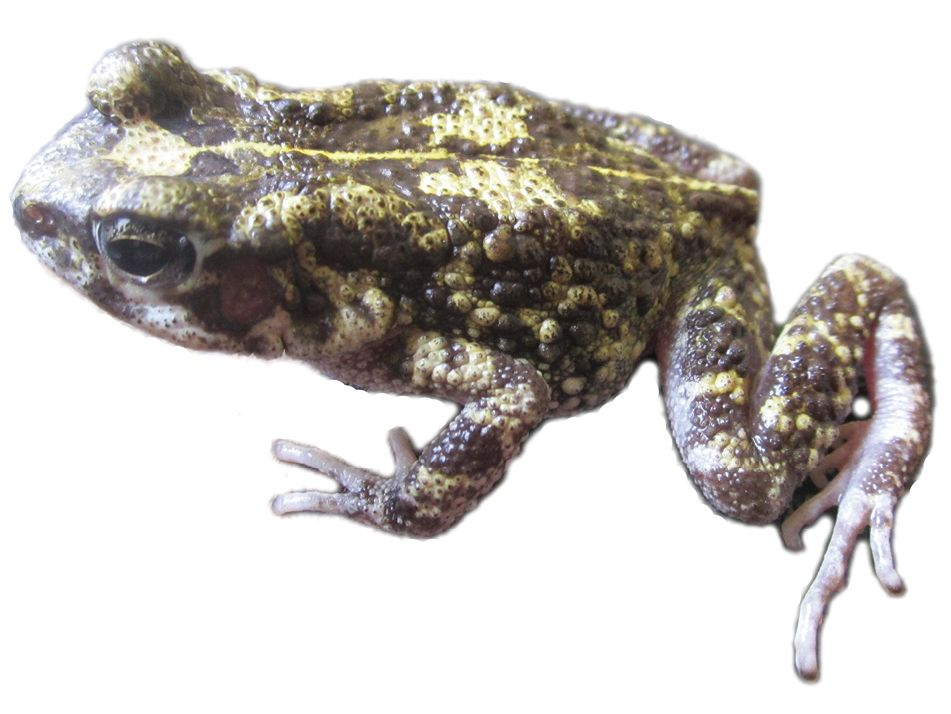

Conservation status
- Critically Endangered (IUCN 3.1)

Scientific classification
- Kingdom: Animalia
- Phylum: Chordata
- Class: Amphibia
- Order: Anura
- Family: Bufonidae
- Genus: Sclerophrys
- Species: S. perreti

Binomial name
- Sclerophrys perreti (Schiøtz, 1963)

Synonyms
- Bufo perreti Schiøtz, 1963; Amietophrynus perreti (Schiøtz, 1963)

= Sclerophrys perreti =

Species of amphibian

Sclerophrys perreti (formerly Amietophrynus perreti) is a species of toad in the family Bufonidae. It is endemic to the Idanre Hills in southwestern Nigeria. Sclerophrys perreti is one of the frogs declared as "Lost" in 2010. However, it was re-discovered at its type locality in 2013. Before that, it had not been seen—possibly—since 1970, and with certainty, since 1963. Common name Perret's toad has been coined for it.

== Etymology ==
The specific name perreti honours Perret, a Swiss herpetologist who has specialized in African amphibians.

== Description ==
Males measure 39–40 mm (1.5–1.6 in) and females 55–64 mm (2.2–2.5 in) in snout–vent length. The head is comparatively flat. Males have white throats. Parotoid glands are moderately developed.

The adult frogs live in patches of shrubby vegetation occurring on the inselbergs or gneiss domes in the forest on which it lives. Tadpoles are unusual compared to other Sclerophrys species: they are not aquatic but semi-terrestrial, living in shallow water-films on wet, sometimes nearly vertical rocks.

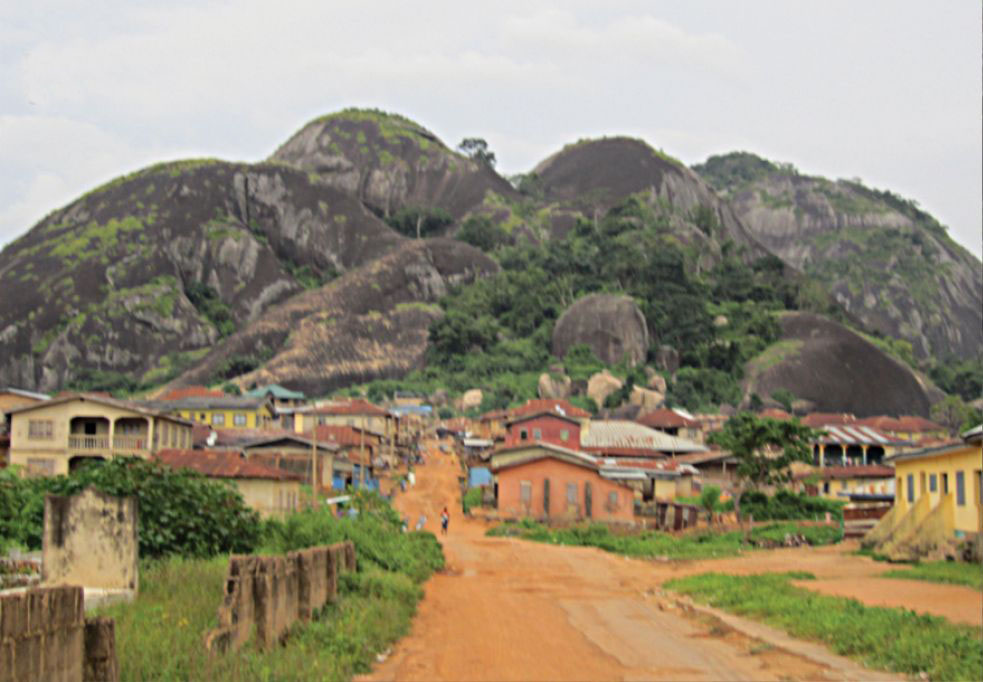
Type locality of Sclerophrys perreti at the outskirts of Idanre, south-western Nigeria.

== Habitat and conservation ==
Perret's toad is endemic to Nigeria where it is known from a single locality, the Idanre Hill in the southwestern part of the country. Only one population of Sclerophrys perreti is known. Searches in nearby areas have failed to locate other populations in suitable habitat, nevertheless, the toad is common in the location where it is found and the tadpoles plentiful. The area is rocky and inaccessible and the International Union for Conservation of Nature thinks it likely that more populations would be found if more herpetological surveys were done; no particular threats have been recognized.
