= Ureta =

Scientific classification
- Kingdom: Animalia
- Phylum: Arthropoda
- Subphylum: Chelicerata
- Class: Arachnida
- Order: Araneae
- Infraorder: Araneomorphae
- Family: Salticidae
- Subfamily: Salticinae
- Genus: Ureta; Wesolowska & Haddad, 2013

Type species
- U. quadrispinosa (Lawrence, 1938)

Species
- U. ghigii (Caporiacco, 1949); U. quadrispinosa (Lawrence, 1938)

Genus of spiders

Ureta is a genus of African jumping spiders that was first described by Wanda Wesołowska & Charles R. Haddad in 2013.

== Species ==
As of October 2025, this genus includes two species:

- Ureta ghigii (Caporiacco, 1949) – Kenya
- Ureta quadrispinosa (Lawrence, 1938) – South Africa (type species)
