= Tarne =

Scientific classification
- Kingdom: Animalia
- Phylum: Arthropoda
- Subphylum: Chelicerata
- Class: Arachnida
- Order: Araneae
- Infraorder: Araneomorphae
- Family: Salticidae
- Genus: Tarne; Simon, 1886
- Species: T. dives

Binomial name
- Tarne dives Simon, 1886

Genus of spiders

Tarne is a monotypic genus of West African jumping spiders containing the single species, Tarne dives. It was first described by Eugène Louis Simon in 1886, and is found only in Africa.
