= Saraina =

Scientific classification
- Kingdom: Animalia
- Phylum: Arthropoda
- Subphylum: Chelicerata
- Class: Arachnida
- Order: Araneae
- Infraorder: Araneomorphae
- Family: Salticidae
- Subfamily: Salticinae
- Genus: Saraina; Wanless & Clark, 1975

Species
- See text.

Diversity
- 3 species

Genus of spiders

Saraina is a spider genus of the jumping spider family, Salticidae, found in Africa.

Males are about four millimeters long, females reach almost nine millimeters. The relationships of this genus are unclear, as the copulatory organs are so unique that there are no genera with similar structures.

== Species ==
As of March 2017, the World Spider Catalog accepted the following species:

- Saraina deltshevi Azarkina, 2009 – Congo
- Saraina kindamba Azarkina, 2009 – Congo
- Saraina rubrofasciata Wanless & Clark, 1975 (type species) – Ivory Coast, Cameroon, Nigeria

== Distribution ==
The original description was based on five females from Ivory Coast, Nigeria and Cameroon. Others were later discovered in the Republic of the Congo. Several males have later been found.
