= Lamottella =

Scientific classification
- Kingdom: Animalia
- Phylum: Arthropoda
- Subphylum: Chelicerata
- Class: Arachnida
- Order: Araneae
- Infraorder: Araneomorphae
- Family: Salticidae
- Subfamily: Salticinae; Rollard & Wesołowska, 2002
- Genus: Lamottella; Rollard & Wesołowska, 2002

Type species
- Lamottella longipes

Diversity
- 3 species

Genus of spiders

Lamottella is a spider genus of the jumping spider family, Salticidae. It contains three species.

== Taxonomy ==
The genus is named in honor of Maxime Lamotte, an ecologist and frog specialist who initiated the early expeditions into the Nimba Mountains.

== Species ==
As of October 2025, this genus includes three species:

- Lamottella longipes Rollard & Wesołowska, 2002 – Guinea (type species)
- Lamottella mirabilis Wesołowska & Henrard, 2025 – Guinea
- Lamottella proszynskii Wawer & Wesołowska, 2024 – Ghana
