= Gramenca =

Scientific classification
- Kingdom: Animalia
- Phylum: Arthropoda
- Subphylum: Chelicerata
- Class: Arachnida
- Order: Araneae
- Infraorder: Araneomorphae
- Family: Salticidae
- Genus: Gramenca; Rollard & Wesołowska, 2002
- Species: G. prima

Binomial name
- Gramenca prima Rollard & Wesołowska, 2002

Genus of spiders

Gramenca is a genus of the spider family Salticidae (jumping spiders). Its single described species, Gramenca prima, is found in Guinea.

== Name ==
The genus name is derived from Latin gramen "grass", which is the habitat of G. prima. The specific name prima means first, for this is the first described Gramenca species.

== Appearance ==
The female spider is about 3 millimetres (0.12 in) long. The male is not yet known.
