= Idanre Hill =

Hills in Ondo State, Nigeria

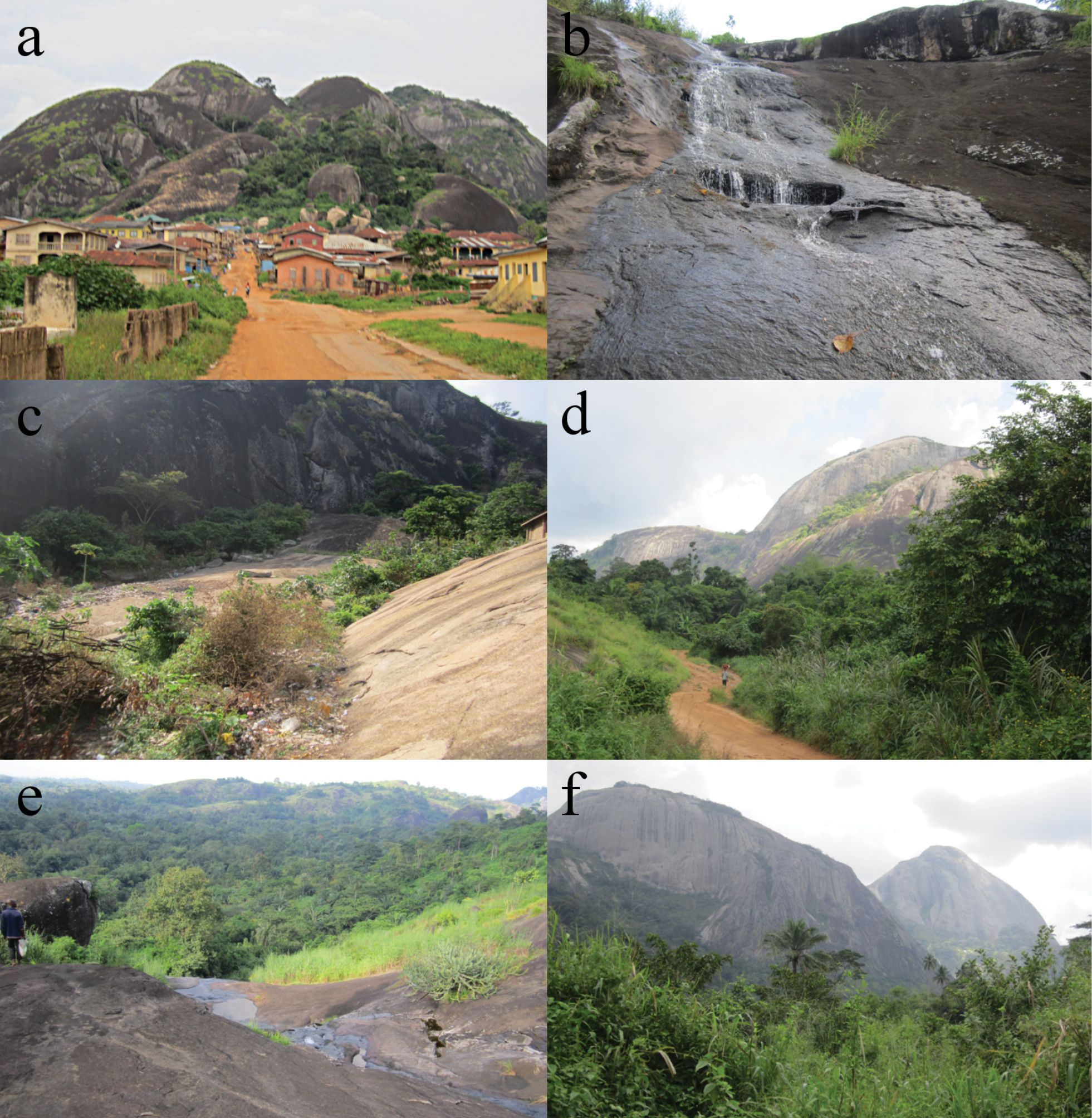
Views from Idanre Hill.

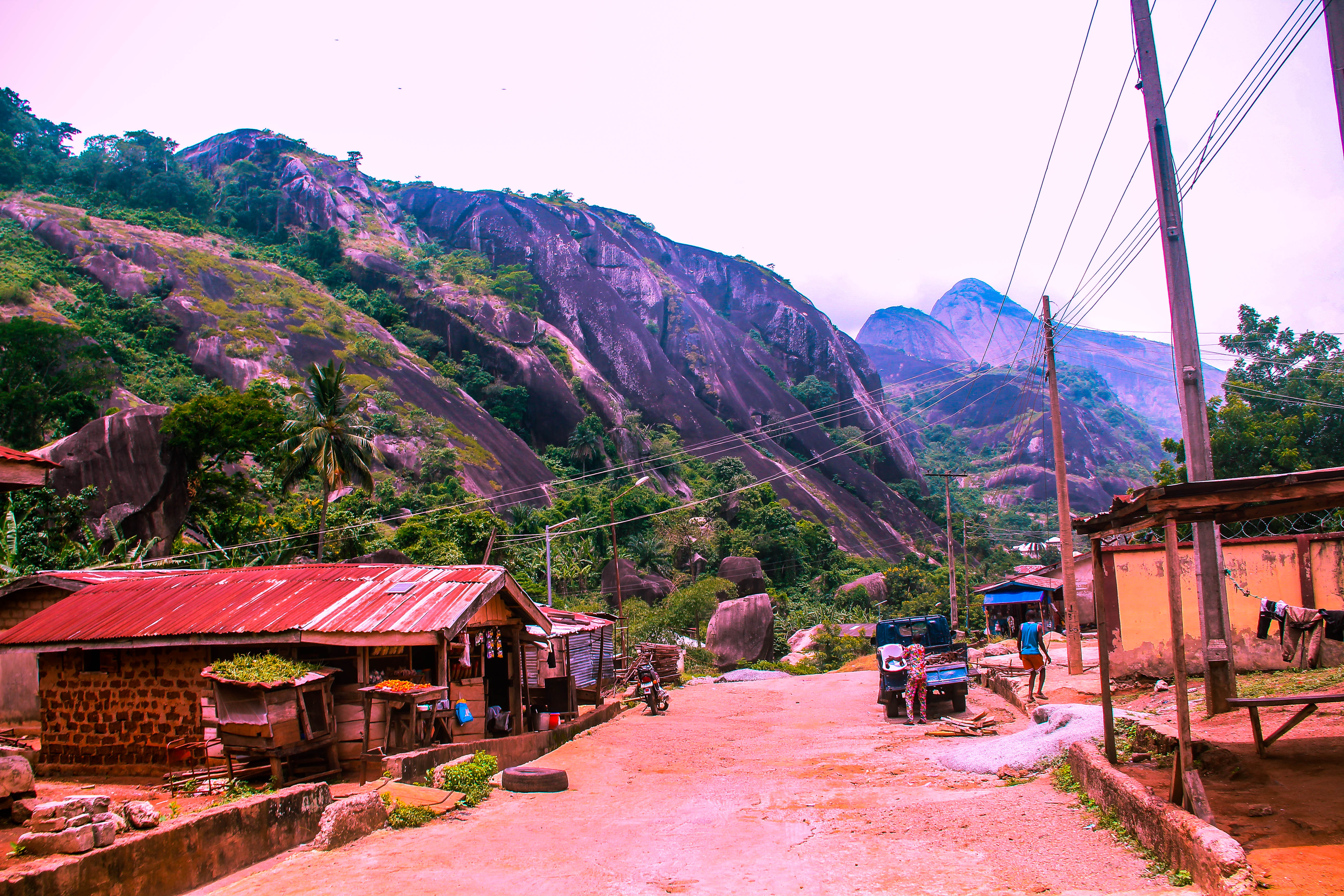
Idanre Hill, April 2023.

The Idanre Hill, or Oke Idanre, is located in the town of Idanre in Ondo State of southwestern Nigeria.

It is well known for its scenic landscape. Its wide variety of cultural sites like 'Owa's Palace', shrines, The Old Court, Belfry, Agboogun footprint, thunder water (Omi Apaara), and burial grounds have since brought the location fame and the nation's nomination for the UNESCO World Heritage Site shortlist. It is situated 3,000 ft (914.4 metres) above sea level and houses a unique ecosystem into which the cultural landscape has integrated. It also has diverse and variegated ecosystems of flora and fauna.

Idanre Hill contains very important biophysical and land-form features, the interaction of which with the physical features has created an enduring cultural landscape within the setting.

== Statements of authenticity and/or integrity ==
Idanre Hill is a natural landscape located in Ondo State, Nigeria. Its beauty has inspired much human curiosity. The people of Idanre have lived among these boulders for almost a millennium.

Since emigration began declining in 1923, the topography, vegetation, fauna, and floral life have remained undistributed. However, festivals provide occasions for low-landers to be reunited with the natural environment, as well as to re-enact historical episodes in local Idanre history and its wider Yoruba ideology, mythology, and confederacy. Among these is the Ogun festival during October and the Ije festival.

The flora and fauna of Idanre Hill are also unique. Among the fauna is a special species of tailless animals called the hyrax that lives on the rocks and is becoming extinct because of hunting, and special monkeys that have been spotted near Orosun hills.

Idanre Hill is also host to a group of scientists and field researchers, and the hill is also used by filmmakers as location for many of their films. In addition, it is referenced in the work of the sole Nobel Prize winner for Literature in Africa, Professor Wole Soyinka, who is known for his work 'Idanre and other Poems'.

== Comparison with other similar properties ==
Most settlements in Nigeria have, by nature and tradition, been around or attached to groves and hills. The majority of these groves and hills have either been abandoned or are now limited to very small areas. Idanre Hill, however—like Dalla Hill in Kano North West, Nigeria—has retained its quality as the central moderating influence of the settlement pattern of the Idanre people. Like Dalla Hill, which started as an iron ore prospecting settlement and provided the foundation for the growth of Kano city, Idanre Hill forms the nucleus for the people of Idanre.

== Geology ==
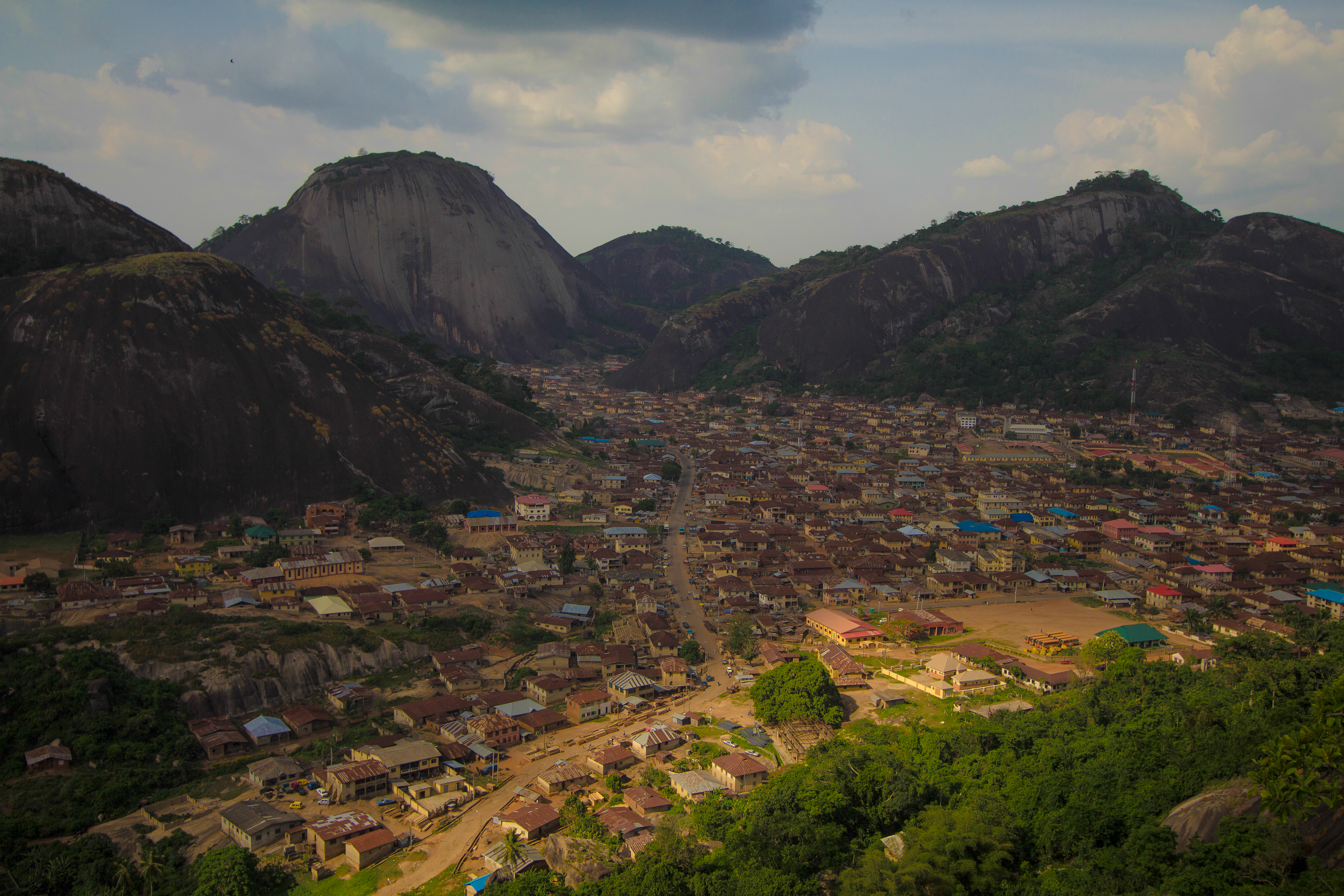
Idanre Hill.

Idanre Hill is located on a Precambrian igneous batholith about 500 million years old, cut by several large fractures that form deep valleys within the rocks.

== World Heritage status ==
This site was added to the UNESCO World Heritage Tentative List on 8 October 2007 in the Cultural category.

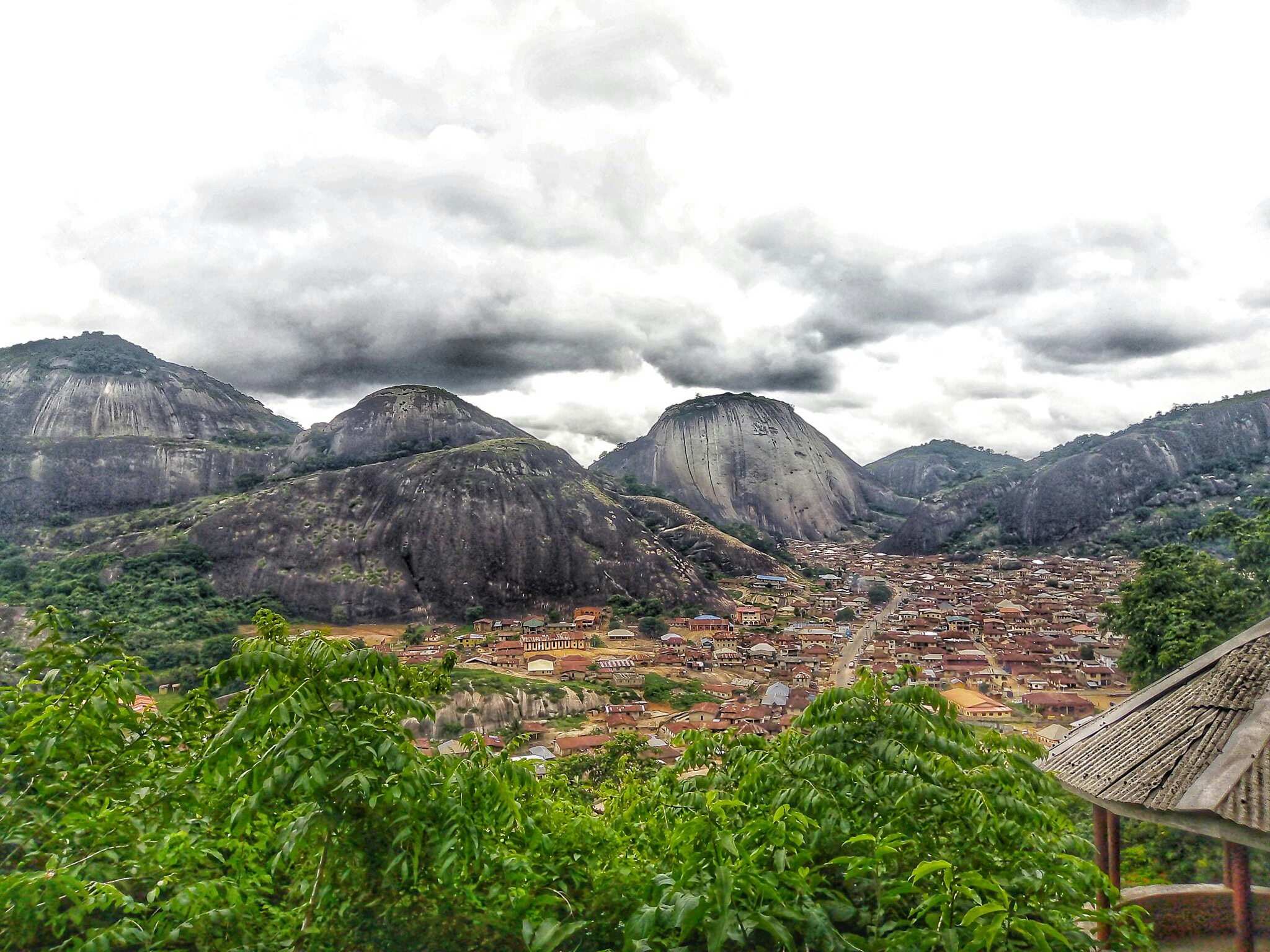
The hill's limestone karst, adjacent to the town of Idanre.

== Myths ==
Idanre Hill is said to have nine ancient wonders and beliefs. The following myths are located there: 'Ibi Akaso' (the Steps); the king's palace; Agboogun's Legacy; unreadable signs; Agboogun's footprint; the wonderful mat; 'Omi Aopara' (Aopara water); Orosun Hill; and the Arun River.

== Wildlife ==
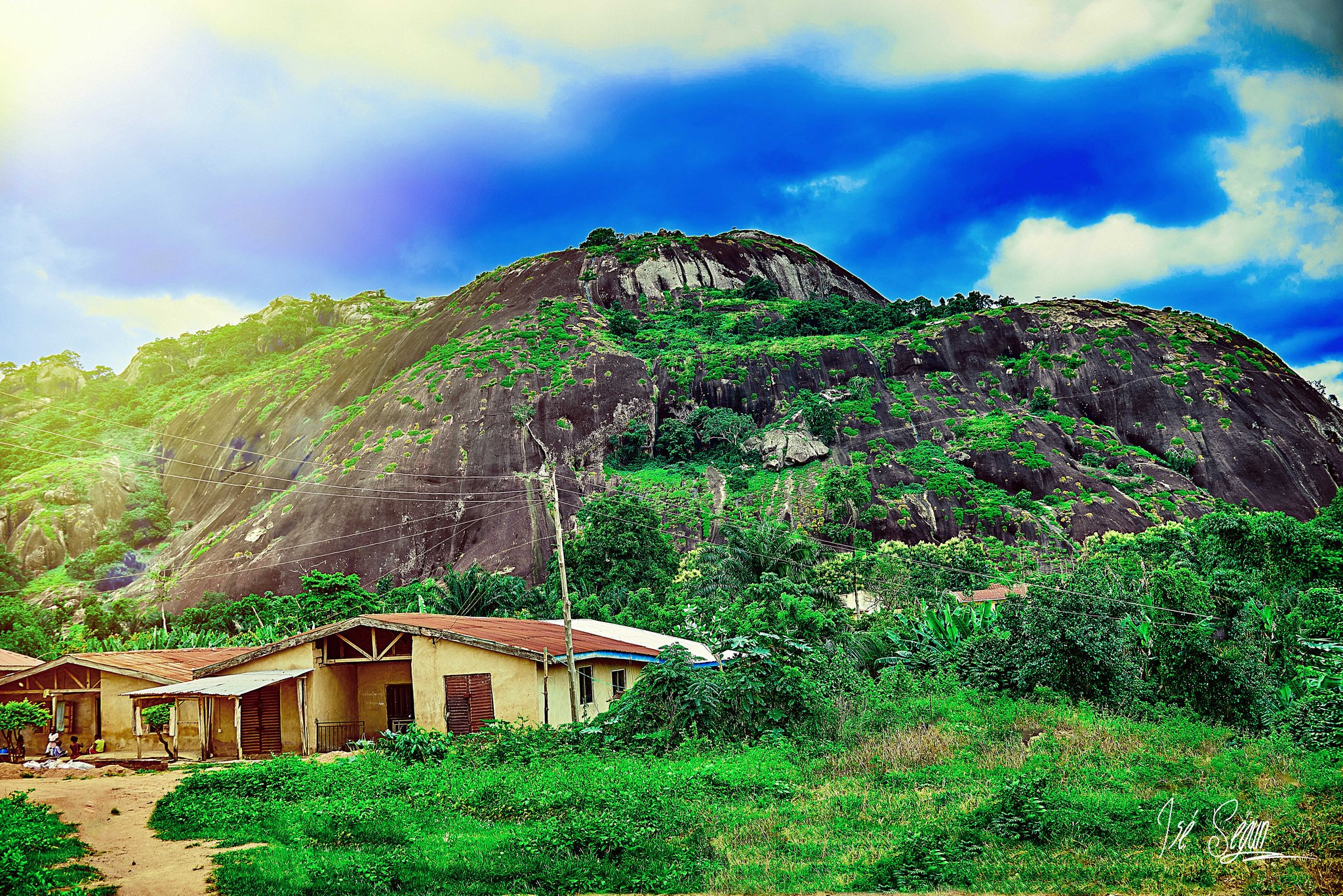
The hill is listed among UNESCO World Heritage Sites.

The Perret's toad is known only from a single locality at the Idanre Hill. The Idanre Forests are one of the six sites where forest elephants are found in southern Nigeria. The others are the Omo Forests in Ogun State; Okomu National Park in Edo State; Cross River National Park in Cross River State; Osse River Park in Ondo State; and Andoni Island in Rivers State. (Nigerian Conservation Foundation)

== Civilization ==
Although the ancient settlement of Idanre has existed on the hill since antiquity, Western civilization was introduced to the ancient city when a team of missionaries led by Rev. Gilbert Carter arrived in 1894. The missionaries built the first primary school in 1896, a clay building that still stands today. In 1906, a law court was established, which includes an ancient prison.
