= Pochytoides =

Scientific classification
- Kingdom: Animalia
- Phylum: Arthropoda
- Subphylum: Chelicerata
- Class: Arachnida
- Order: Araneae
- Infraorder: Araneomorphae
- Family: Salticidae
- Subfamily: Salticinae
- Genus: Pochytoides; Wesołowska, 2020

Type species
- Pochyta poissoni (Berland & Millot, 1941)

Species
- 11, see text

Genus of spiders

Pochytoides is a genus of African jumping spiders that was first described by Wanda Wesołowska in 2020.

== Taxonomy ==
The group was first described by Berland and Millot in 1941 as a subgenus of the genus Pochyta. It was elevated to a full genus by Wanda Wesołowska in 2018. However, neither name was valid as no type species had been given. Wesołowska corrected this in 2020, designating Pochyta poissoni.

Like Pochyta, Pochytoides is placed in the tribe Aelurillini in the Salticoida clade of the subfamily Salticinae.

=== Species ===
As of October 2022 the genus contained eleven species. All species are known from Guinea and/or Ivory Coast:

- Pochytoides lamottei (Wesołowska, 2018)
- Pochytoides mirabilis Wesołowska & Russell-Smith, 2022
- Pochytoides monticola (Wesołowska, 2018)
- Pochytoides obstipa (Wesołowska, 2018)
- Pochytoides patellaris (Wesołowska, 2018)
- Pochytoides perezi (Berland & Millot, 1941)
- Pochytoides poissoni (Berland & Millot, 1941)
- Pochytoides securis (Wesołowska, 2018)
- Pochytoides spinigera (Wesołowska, 2018)
- Pochytoides tonkoui Wesołowska & Russell-Smith, 2022
- Pochytoides tournieri Wesołowska & Russell-Smith, 2022
