= Ragatinus =

Scientific classification
- Kingdom: Animalia
- Phylum: Arthropoda
- Subphylum: Chelicerata
- Class: Arachnida
- Order: Araneae
- Infraorder: Araneomorphae
- Family: Salticidae
- Subfamily: Salticinae
- Genus: Ragatinus; Dawidowicz & Wesołowska, 2016
- Species: R. maddisoni

Binomial name
- Ragatinus maddisoni Dawidowicz & Wesołowska, 2016

Genus of spiders

Ragatinus is a genus of spiders in the family Salticidae. It was first described in 2016 by Angelika Dawidowicz and Wanda Wesołowska. As of 2017, it contains only one species, Ragatinus maddisoni.

Dawidowicz and Wesołowska placed the genus in the subtribe Thiratoscirtina, which is placed in the Salticoida clade of the subfamily Salticinae (tribe Aelurillini) in Maddison's 2015 classification of the Salticidae.
