= Malizna =

Scientific classification
- Kingdom: Animalia
- Phylum: Arthropoda
- Subphylum: Chelicerata
- Class: Arachnida
- Order: Araneae
- Infraorder: Araneomorphae
- Family: Salticidae
- Genus: Malizna; Wesołowska, 2021
- Species: M. admirabilis

Binomial name
- Malizna admirabilis Wesołowska, 2021

Genus of jumping spiders

Malizna is a monotypic genus of African jumping spiders containing the single species, Malizna admirabilis. It was first described by Wanda Wesołowska in 2021.

== See also ==
- List of Salticidae genera
