= Ajaraneola =

Scientific classification
- Kingdom: Animalia
- Phylum: Arthropoda
- Subphylum: Chelicerata
- Class: Arachnida
- Order: Araneae
- Infraorder: Araneomorphae
- Family: Salticidae
- Subfamily: Salticinae
- Genus: Ajaraneola; Wesolowska & Russell-Smith, 2011

Type species
- Ajaraneola mastigophora Wesolowska & A. Russell-Smith, 2011

Species
- 2, see text

Genus of spiders

Ajaraneola is a genus of African jumping spiders that contains two species, Ajaraneola mastigophora and Ajaraneola pajakwandy. The name of the genus derives from the name of forest goddess, Aja, in one of the languages of Nigeria, Yoruba. The genus was first described in 2011 from specimens of Ajaraneola mastigophora found in Nigeria. The second species was first described in 2021 from examples found in Uganda. The spiders are medium-sized and have a characteristic whip-like embolus.

== Taxonomy and etymology ==
When first described by Wanda Wesołowska and Anthony Russell-Smith in 2011, Ajaraneola was placed in the family Salticidae. The name of the spider recalls two words, one in Yoruba, a language of southern Nigeria, and the other in Latin. The first part of the name, Aja, is a Yoruba goddess of the forest. The second part derives from the Latin word araneola, meaning little spider.

In 2015, Wayne Maddison tentatively placed the genus in the subtribe Thiratoscirtina on the basis of the dissociation of the embolus that the it shares with other genera like Cembalea. The subtribe had been first described by Bodner & Maddison in 2012 and placed within the tribe Thiratoscirtinae.

== Species ==
The type species for the genus is Ajaraneola mastigophora. Originally, the genus had been monotypic until the addition of Ajaraneola pajakwandy in 2021.

=== Ajaraneola mastigophora ===
Ajaraneola mastigophora was first described by Wanda Wesołowska and Anthony Russell-Smith in 2011. The team identified both a male holotype and female paratype. The name recalls the Latin for whip-bearer, and relates to the long embolus.

=== Ajaraneola pajakwandy ===
Ajaraneola pajakwandy was first identified by Tamás Szűts and Wayne Maddison in 2021. The name derives from two words, pająk Wandy, which, if reversed, can be translated Wanda’s spider, after Wanda Wesołowska. The team chose the name "acknowledging her extraordinary contribution to Afrotropical jumping spider and thiratoscirtine taxonomy."

== Description ==
Ajaraneola is a medium-sized jumping spider with a particularly long front pair of legs. It is generally dark brown, with a high carapace, which is oval in the case of Ajaraneola mastigophora and more quadrangular in Ajaraneola pajakwandy. The carapace is typically 2.05 centimetres (0.81 in) long. The abdomen is typically 2.8 to 3.0 centimetres (1.1 to 1.2 in) long and is covered in short hairs. It can have a pattern on it of grey spots. The male is distinguished from other jumping spiders by having a split in the hardened part of the palpal bulb and a long and thread-like embolus. The female has a large vesicle-like structure in the middle of the seminal duct which seems unique.

== Distribution ==
The first example of the genus, of the species Ajaraneola mastigophora, was found on Obudu Plateau in Cross River State, Nigeria. Subsequently, the species Ajaraneola pajakwandy was discovered in the Bwindi Impenetrable National Park in Rukungiri District, Uganda. The genus therefore has a range that includes Nigeria and Uganda.
