= List of spiders of Socotra =

This is a list of spider species that occur on Socotra. Unless otherwise noted, they are endemic (they occur only there).

== Agelenidae ==
- Agelenella pusilla (Pocock, 1903)

== Araneidae ==
- Araneus cardioceros Pocock, 1899
- Gasteracantha sanguinolenta C. L. Koch, 1844 — also in Africa and São Tomé
- Nephila sumptuosa Gerstäcker, 1873 — also in East Africa

== Oxyopidae ==
- Oxyopes rutilus Simon, 1890 — also in Yemen
- Peucetia viridis Blackwall, 1858, 1844 — also in Yemen

== Barychelidae ==
- Atrophothele socotrana Pocock, 1903

== Cheiracanthiidae ==
- Cheiracanthium socotrense Pocock, 1903

== Gnaphosidae ==
- Zimiris diffusa Platnick & Penney, 2004 — also in St. Helena and India

== Hersiliidae ==
- Hersilia wraniki Rheims, Brescovit & van Harten, 2004 — also in Yemen

== Migidae ==
- Moggridgea socotra Griswold, 1987

== Oonopidae ==
- Gamasomorpha deksam Saaristo & van Harten, 2002
- Orchestina bedu Saaristo & van Harten, 2002
- Orchestina foa Saaristo & van Harten, 2002
- Silhouettella usgutra Saaristo & van Harten, 2002
- Socotroonops socotra Saaristo & van Harten, 2002

== Oxyopidae ==
- Oxyopes rutilius Simon, 1890 — also in Yemen

== Palpimanidae ==
- Scelidomachus socotranus Pocock, 1899

== Philodromidae ==
- Thanatus forbesi Pocock, 1903

== Pholcidae ==
- Leptopholcus dioscoridis Deeleman-Reinhold & van Harten, 2001

== Salticidae ==
- Afrobeata firma Wesołowska & van Harten, 1994
- Bianor biguttatus Wesołowska & van Harten, 2002
- Habrocestum albopunctatum Wesołowska & van Harten, 2002
- Habrocestum dubium Wesołowska & van Harten, 2002
- Habrocestum ferrugineum Wesołowska & van Harten, 2002
- Habrocestum inquinatum Wesołowska & van Harten, 2002
- Habrocestum socotrense Wesołowska & van Harten, 2002
- Habrocestum speciosum Wesołowska & van Harten, 1994
- Hasarius insularis Wesołowska & van Harten, 2002
- Heliophanillus suedicola (Simon, 1901) — also in Yemen
- Heliophanus parvus Wesołowska & van Harten, 1994
- Pellenes striolatus Wesołowska & van Harten, 2002
- Pseudicius mirus Wesołowska & van Harten, 2002
- Rafalus insignipalpis Simon, 1882 — also in Yemen
- Thyene similis Wesołowska & van Harten, 2002

== Sparassidae ==
- Olios socotranus (Pocock, 1903)

== Tetragnathidae ==
- Tetragnatha granti Pocock, 1903

== Theraphosidae ==
- Monocentropus balfouri Pocock, 1897

== Theridiidae ==
- Latrodectus hystrix Simon, 1890 — also in Yemen

== Thomisidae ==
- Bassaniodes socotrensis Pocock, 1903
- Dimizonops insularis Pocock, 1903

== Zodariidae ==
- Cydrela insularis (Pocock, 1899)
