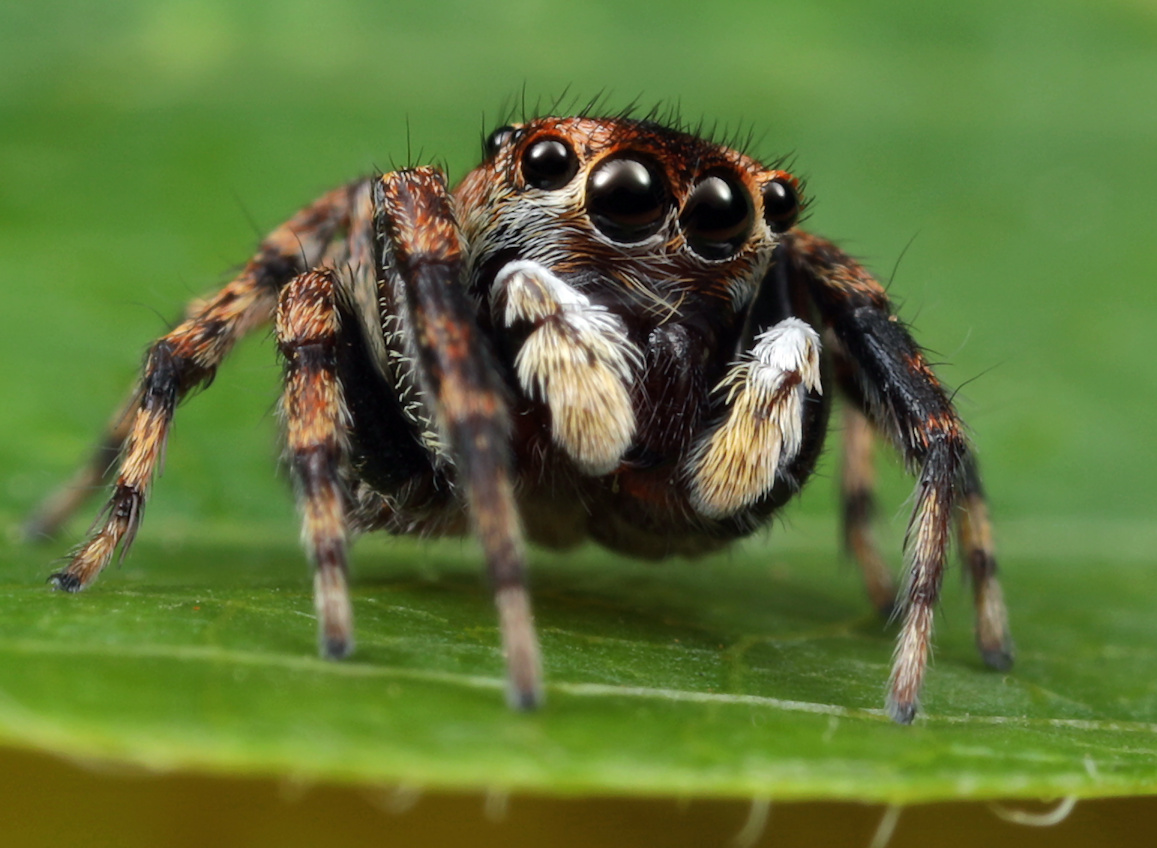

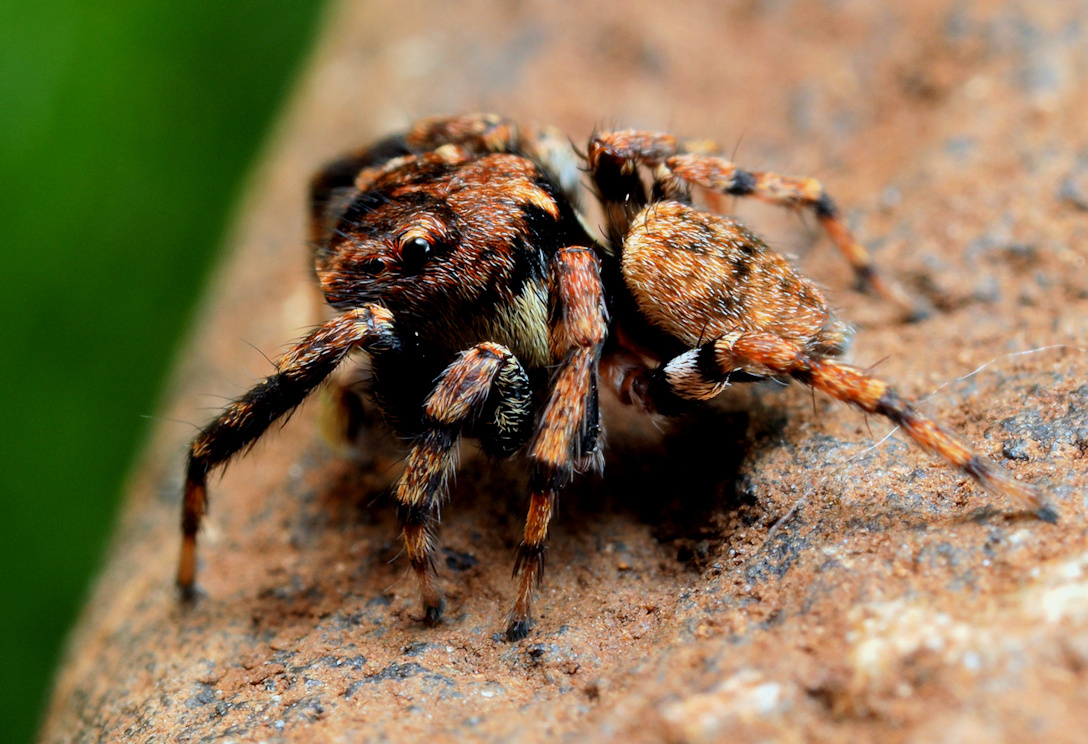
- Male spiders found near Blyde River

Scientific classification
- Kingdom: Animalia
- Phylum: Arthropoda
- Subphylum: Chelicerata
- Class: Arachnida
- Order: Araneae
- Infraorder: Araneomorphae
- Family: Salticidae
- Genus: Habrocestum
- Species: H. africanum

Binomial name
- Habrocestum africanum Wesołowska & Haddad, 2009

= Habrocestum africanum =

Ndumo Habrocestum Jumping Spider

Species of jumping spider

Habrocestum africanum, the Ndumo Habrocestum jumping spider, is a species of spider that is endemic to South Africa. It lives in fynbos and savanna, being found on the ground, amongst trees and in leaf litter. First described in 2009, the spider is small with a total length between 3.3 and 4.7 mm (0.13 and 0.19 in), the female being larger than the male. The female's pedipalps, sensory organs near its mouth, are also yellow while the male's are brown. Otherwise, the sexes are visually similar. They are generally dark brown on top and yellow underneath with a dark yellow abdomen that has a pattern of brown patches and stripes. The spider's legs are dark yellow and have brown spots. It eats Odontotermes termites and is found living with other termite-eating spiders. Although difficult to differentiate from other species in the genus Habrocestum, it can be identified by its distinctive copulatory organs, particularly the irregular shape of the male's palpal bulb and its very short curved embolus and the internal arrangement of ducts and spermathecae, or receptacles, inside the female.

== Taxonomy and etymology ==
Habrocestum africanum is a species of jumping spider, a member of the family Salticidae, that was first described by the arachnologists Wanda Wesołowska and Antony van Harten in 2009. They allocated the species to the genus Habrocestum, first circumscribed by Eugène Simon in 1886. It was one of over 500 species identified by Wesołowska during her career. Its generic name is derived from a Greek word, habros, meaning 'beauty', and a Latin word cestus, which means 'belt'. Its specific name is based on the word Africa.

In 2015, Wayne Maddison placed the genus in the tribe Hasarini; this is a member of the subclade Saltafresia in the clade Salticoida. Phylogenetic analysis of molecular data demonstrates that the genus is closely related to Chinattus and Hasarius. In 2017, Jerzy Prószyński grouped the genus with 32 other genera of jumping spiders under the name Chrysillines in the supergroup Chrysilloida. The species is commonly known as Ndumo Habrocestum jumping spider.

== Description ==
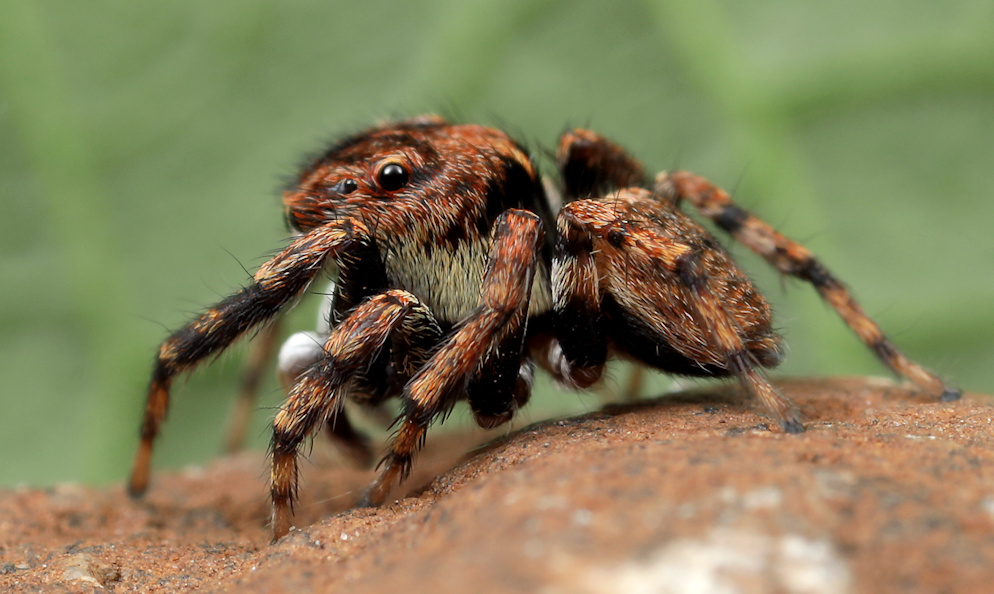
Male

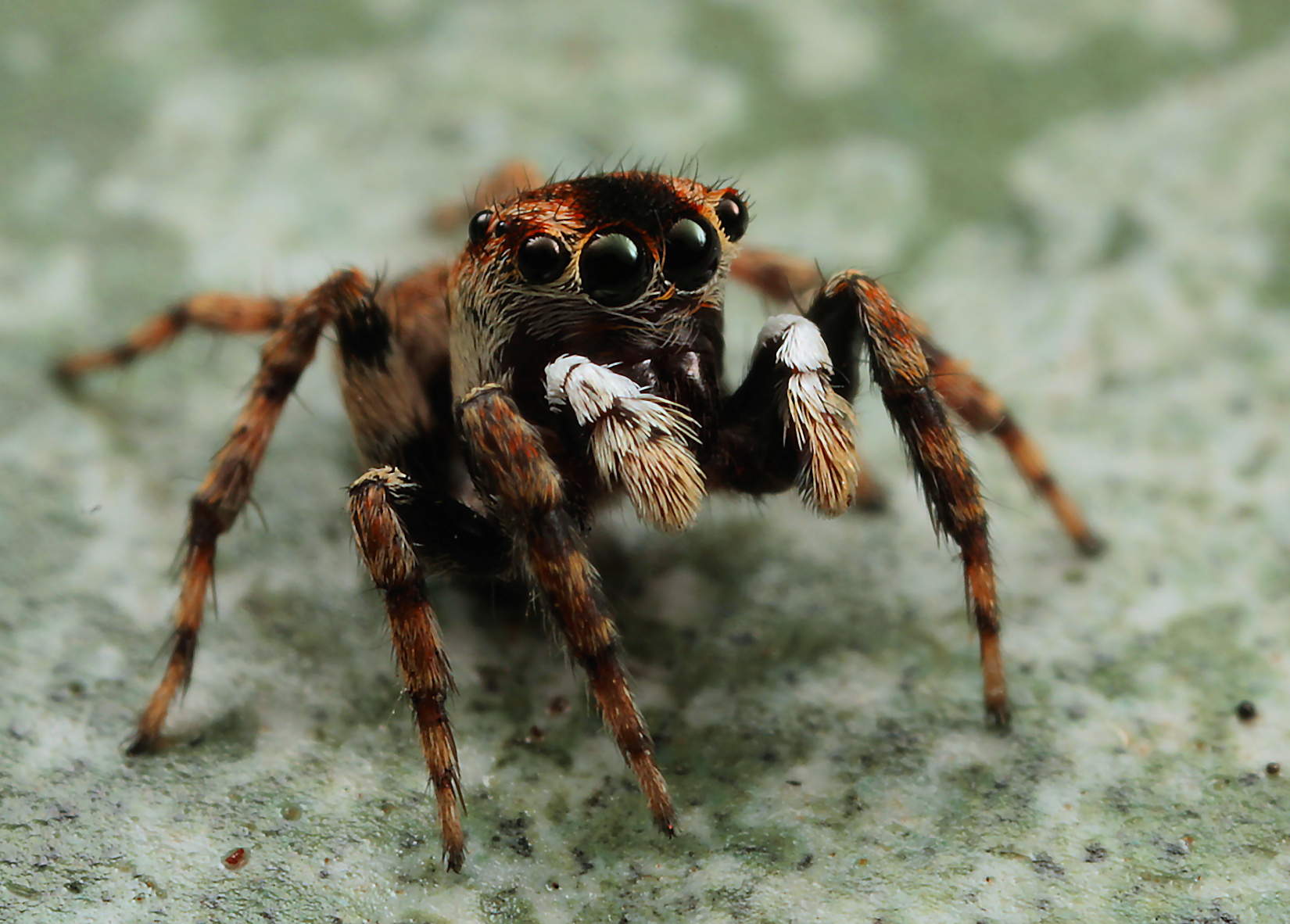
Male

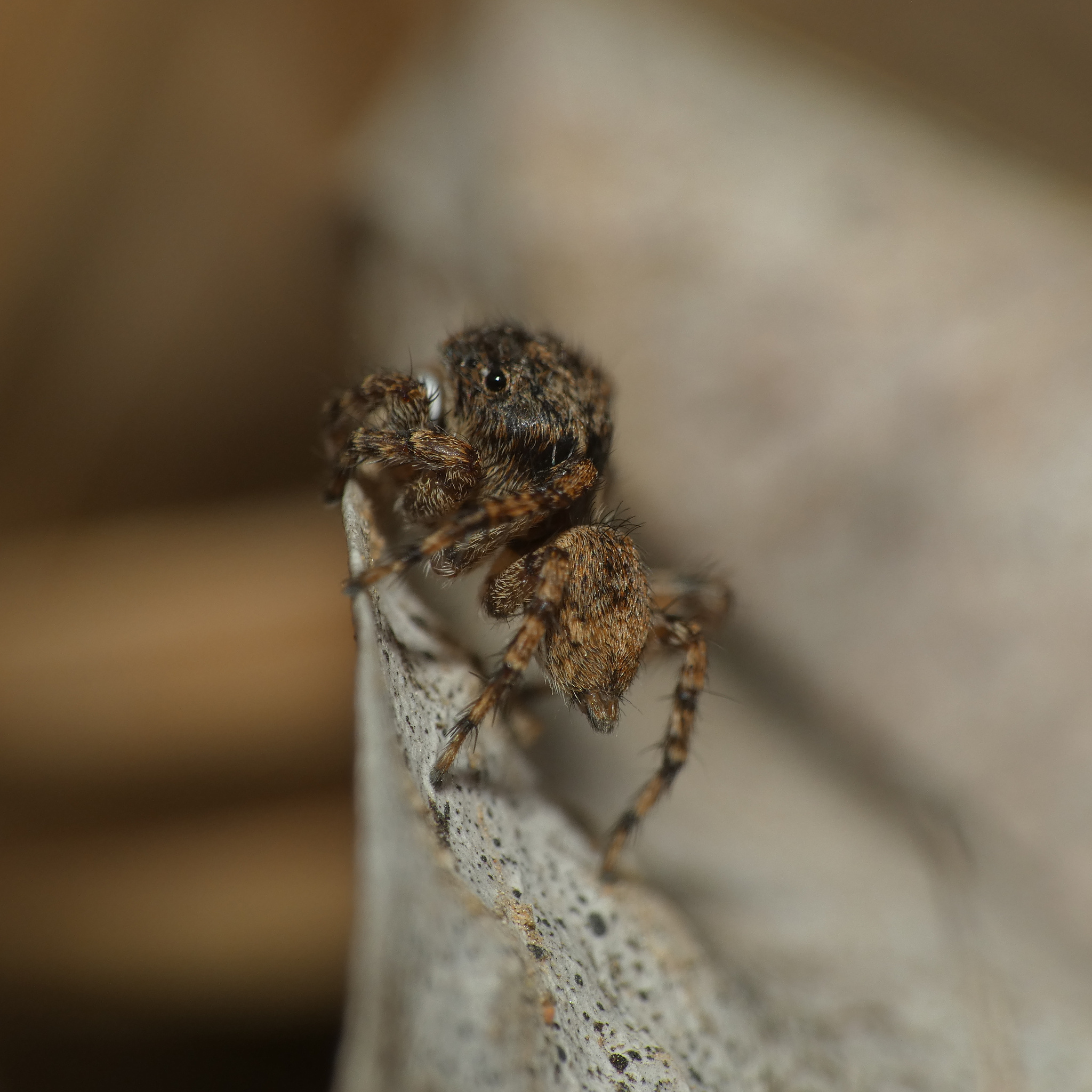
Juvenile

Habrocestum africanum is a small spider with distinctive characteristics. Its body is divided into two main parts: a forward section, known as its cephalothorax, and, behind that, an oval abdomen. The male has a high carapace, the hard upper part of the cephalothorax, that is typically 1.9 mm (0.07 in) long and 1.4 mm (0.06 in) wide. It is dark brown and covered in greyish hairs. It has a short black area at the front, its eye field, and a steep slope to the rear. There are orange hairs and brown bristles near the spider's eyes. The underside of the cephalothorax, or sternum, is dark yellow. The spider's face, or clypeus, is light brown. Its teeth have multiple cusps. It mouthparts, its chelicerae, labium and maxillae, brown.

The male spider's abdomen is narrower than its carapace, measuring typically 1.4 mm in length and 1.1 mm (0.04 in) in width. It is dark yellow on top, marked with a brown pattern and brown hairs, and yellow with a grey tinge underneath. The pattern consists of a series of patches to the front and five narrow parallel lines to the rear. Its legs are dark yellow with brown spots. The first pair of legs are slightly darker than the others. The third pair of legs are the longest. There are brown hairs and many long brown spines on its legs.

The spider has distinctive copulatory organs. The male's pedipalps, sensory organs near the spider's face, are brown and covered in white hairs. They end with a tibia that has a curved appendage, or apophysis, that runs alongside its palpal bulb. The main part of the bulb, its tegulum, has a bulge that runs alongside the apophysis and two at its base that extends almost to the base of the tibia. At the top of the tegulum there is a very small curved embolus. It is this curve differentiates the species from the related Habrocestum emanasakgrensis as both species have similarly irregularly-shaped palpal bulbs. Otherwise, it is the irregular shape of the bulb that distinguishes the spider from others in the genus.

The female Habrocestum africanum has a carapace that is between 2.1 and 2.2 mm (0.08 and 0.09 in) long and between 1.7 and 1.8 mm (0.07 and 0.07 in) wide and an abdomen that is typically 2.5 mm (0.10 in) long and 1.7 and2.1 wide. Its pedipalps are yellow. It otherwise is similar to the male. Its copulatory organs are very similar to the related Habrocestum mozambicum, differing mainly in having longer insemination ducts. Its epigyne, the external visible part of its copulatory organs, is rounded and has a deep pocket to the rear near the groove known as its epigastric furrow. There are two copulatory openings that lead into insemination ducts that show signs of sclerotisation. It has bean-shaped spermathecae, or receptacles. Its spermathecae are longer that the related Habrocestum tanzanicum.

== Distribution ==
Habrocestum spiders have been found across Africa, Asia and Europe. Habrocestum africanum is found only in South Africa, where it has been recorded from KwaZulu-Natal and Western Cape. Notable locations include iSimangaliso Wetland Park, Ndumo Game Reserve, Tembe Elephant Park, Ophathe Game Reserve, and De Hoop Nature Reserve.

== Habitat and ecology ==
Habrocestum africanum inhabits savanna and fynbos biomes at altitudes ranging up to 505 m (1,657 ft) above sea level. Specimens were collected from the soil surface and leaf litter in thorny thickets. It has occasionally been collected from the foliage of low shrubs and bark of Vachellia xanthophloea. The species eats termites of the Odontotermes genus and has been found living alongside other termite-eating species like Langelurillus squamiger, Stenaelurillus guttiger and Stenaelurillus modestus.

== Conservation ==
Habrocestum africanum is listed as Least Concern by the South African National Biodiversity Institute due to its wide geographical range. There are no known threats and it is protected in six reserves in South Africa.
