= Habrocestum naivasha =

Scientific classification
- Kingdom: Animalia
- Phylum: Arthropoda
- Subphylum: Chelicerata
- Class: Arachnida
- Order: Araneae
- Infraorder: Araneomorphae
- Family: Salticidae
- Genus: Habrocestum
- Species: H. naivasha

Binomial name
- Habrocestum naivasha Dawidowicz & Wesołowska, 2016

Species of jumping spider

Habrocestum naivasha is a species of spider that lives in the forests of East Africa and the slopes of Mount Elgon. First described in 2016, the spider is small with a total length between 3.3 and 4.7 mm (0.13 and 0.19 in). The male and female are similar, being generally brown with a darker eye field. The pattern on its abdomen varies between specimens, with some having a pattern of smudges and two or three pairs of light patches while others are marked with yellowish patches and a line of wide chevrons. There are a few long white hairs on the part of the spider's face called its clypeus. Its legs are short and brown. To distinguish the spider from others in the genus, it is necessary to look at its distinctive copulatory organs, particularly the shape of the male's palpal bulb and its relatively wide embolus and the female's short insemination ducts.

== Taxonomy and etymology ==
Habrocestum naivasha is a species of jumping spider, a member of the family Salticidae, that was first described by the arachnologists Angelika Dawidowicz and Wanda Wesołowska in 2016. They allocated the species to the genus Habrocestum, first circumscribed by Eugène Simon in 1886. It was one of over 500 species identified by Wesołowska during her career. Its generic name is derived from a Greek word, habros, meaning 'beauty', and a Latin word cestus, which means 'belt'. Its specific name is based on the place where it was first found.

In 2015, Wayne Maddison placed the genus in the tribe Hasarini; this is a member of the subclade Saltafresia in the clade Salticoida. Phylogenetic analysis of molecular data demonstrates that the genus is closely related to Chinattus and Hasarius. In 2017, Jerzy Prószyński grouped the genus with 32 other genera of jumping spiders under the name Chrysillines in the supergroup Chrysilloida.

== Description ==
Habrocestum naivasha is a small stocky spider with distinctive characteristics. Its body is divided into two main parts: a forward rounded section, known as its cephalothorax, and, behind that, an oval abdomen. The male has a cephalothorax that is between 1.6 and 1.8 mm (0.06 and 0.07 in) long and 1.3 and 1.4 mm (0.05 and 0.06 in) wide. It's very high carapace, the hard upper part of the cephalothorax, is dark brown and covered in colourless hairs. It has a dark brown eye field at the front and a steep slope to the rear. Its eye field is marked with very small pits The areas around the spider's eyes is black with long bristles sticking out of the sides and short light hairs around the front row. The underside of the cephalothorax, or sternum, is light brown. The part of the spider's face called its clypeus is marked with a few long white hairs. It mouthparts, its chelicerae, labium and maxillae, brown with pale tips at the end of its labium and maxillae. It has two teeth to the front and another behind.

The male spider's abdomen is small and a similar size to its cephalothorax. It is generally brownish on top, marked with a pattern of smudges towards the front and two or three pairs of light patches to the rear. The abdomen is darker in some specimens and marked with two yellowish patches to the front and a line of wide chevrons to the rear. All are covered with long thin brown hairs. It has brown sides and a pattern of either two broad light brown streaks or small dark dots underneath. It has light brown spinnerets that it uses to spin webs. Its legs are short and brown with dark leg hairs.

The spider has distinctive copulatory organs. The male's pedipalps, sensory organs near the spider's face, are brown and covered in dark hairs. They end with a tibia that has a stumpy curved appendage, or apophysis and a clump of hair. Attached to the end of the palpal tibia is a rounded hairy cymbium and a smaller bulging palpal bulb. The main part of the bulb, its tegulum, has a bulge on its side and a wide seminal duct inside it. At the top of the tegulum there is a very small slightly curved embolus that points away from the palpal bulb. The lack of a lobe at the bottom of the tegulum distinguishes the species from others in the genus. The wide embolus separates the species from the related Habrocestum auricomum as both species have similarly irregularly-shaped palpal bulbs.

The female Habrocestum naivasha has a slightly smaller carapace that is between 1.3 and 1.5 mm (0.05 and 0.06 in) long and between 1.2 and 1.3 mm (0.05 and 0.05 in) wide and a larger abdomen that is between 1.6 and 1.8 mm (0.06 and 0.07 in) long and 1.2 and 1.5 mm (0.05 and 0.06 in) wide. It is otherwise similar to the male. Its epigyne, the external visible part of its copulatory organs, shows strong evidence of sclerotization and has a large pocket to the rear near the groove known as its epigastric furrow. There are two copulatory openings near the back of its epigyne that lead via very short insemination ducts to thick-walled spherical spermathecae, or receptacles. The short length of its insemination ducts help distinguish the spider from others in the genus.

== Distribution and habitat ==
Habrocestum spiders have been found across Africa, Asia and Europe. Habrocestum naivasha has been identified in Kenya and Uganda, In Kenya, it was first found near Lake Naivasha. it has also been spotted in Kakamega, Nakuru, Samburu and Trans Nzoia counties. In Uganda, it has been found in Mount Elgon National Park. It lives in rainforests and gallery forests, frequently being found amongst Acacia, juniper and Podocarpus trees. It is sometimes found in the leaf litter found under the trees. The spiders were found at an altitude of up to 2,150 m (7,050 ft) above sea level on the Kenyan side of Mount Elgon.
