= Habrocestum formosum =

Scientific classification
- Kingdom: Animalia
- Phylum: Arthropoda
- Subphylum: Chelicerata
- Class: Arachnida
- Order: Araneae
- Infraorder: Araneomorphae
- Family: Salticidae
- Genus: Habrocestum
- Species: H. formosum

Binomial name
- Habrocestum formosum Wesołowska & van Harten, 2002

Species of jumping spider

Habrocestum formosum is a jumping spider species that is endemic to Zimbabwe. Measuring typically 3.5 mm (0.14 in) in body length, the spider is brown and greyish-beige with a yellowish pattern on its abdomen. There are light grey hairs on some of its upper surfaces and long brown bristles near the spider's eyes. The spider has orange legs that have many brown spines, its front legs being longer and darker than the rest. The male's copulatory organs are distinctive, particularly its sickle-shaped embolus. Its palpal bulb is also smaller than other members of the genus. The female has not been described.

== Taxonomy and etymology ==
Habrocestum formosum is a species of jumping spider, a member of the family Salticidae, that was first described by the arachnologist Wanda Wesołowska in 2000. They allocated the species to the genus Habrocestum, first circumscribed by Eugène Simon in 1886. It was one of over 500 species identified by Wesołowska during her career. The generic name is derived from a Greek word, habros, meaning 'beauty', and a Latin word cestus, which means 'belt'. Its specific name is based on the Latin word formosus that can be translated 'shapely'.

In 2015, Wayne Maddison placed the genus in the tribe Hasariini; this is a member of the subclade Saltafresia in the clade Salticoida. The spider is a member of Plexippoida. Phylogenetic analysis of molecular data demonstrates that the genus is closely related to Chinattus and Hasarius. In 2017, Jerzy Prószyński grouped the genus with 32 other genera of jumping spiders under the name Chrysillines in the supergroup Chrysilloida.

== Description ==
Habrocestum formosum is a small spider with distinctive characteristics. Its body is divided into two main parts: a forward section, known as its cephalothorax, and, behind that, an oval abdomen. The male has a wide carapace, the hard upper part of the cephalothorax, that is typically 2 mm (0.08 in) long, between 1.5 mm (0.06 in) wide and between 0.6 mm (0.02 in) high. It is brown and has a coverage of short light grey hairs on its sides. Its eye field is darker; there are long brown bristles around its eyes, The underside of the cephalothorax, or sternum, is light brown. The spider's face, or clypeus, is low and brown. Its chelicerae have two teeth to the front and a single bicuspid teeth to the rear. The remainder of its mouthparts, its labium and maxillae, are brown with pale tips.

The male spider's rounded abdomen is typically 1.5 mm (0.06 in) in length and between 1.1 mm (0.04 in) in width. It is generally greyish-beige with a yellowish pattern on its upper surface. Underneath, it is dark grey. It has yellow spinnerets, used for spinning webs, at the back. Its legs are orange with dense brown leg hairs and numerous long spines. Its front pair of legs are longer and darker than the rest.

The spider has distinctive copulatory organs. The male's palpal tibia has a single straight spike, called the tibial apophysis, which has a slight curve at its tip. Attached at the end of the tibia is a hairy cymbium.The palpal bulb has a large lobe at its base and a sickle-shaped embolus at its top. Compared to other species in the genus, the spider has a smaller palpal bulb. Its sickle-shaped embolus is also distinctive. Compared to the related Habrocestum africanum, it has a narrower tibial apophysis and a longer embolus. The female has not been described.

== Distribution ==
Habrocestum spiders have been found across Africa, Asia and Europe. Habrocestum formosum is endemic to Zimbabwe. The species was first seen in Gonarezhou National Park.
