= Habrocestum ignorabile =

Scientific classification
- Kingdom: Animalia
- Phylum: Arthropoda
- Subphylum: Chelicerata
- Class: Arachnida
- Order: Araneae
- Infraorder: Araneomorphae
- Family: Salticidae
- Genus: Habrocestum
- Species: H. ignorabile

Binomial name
- Habrocestum ignorabile Wesołowska & van Harten, 2007

Species of jumping spider

Habrocestum ignorabile is a jumping spider species that lives in Yemen. A member of the genus Habrocestum, it is a small spider that is typically 3.9 mm (0.15 in) in body length. The forward part of the spider, its cephalothorax, is generally a darker brown on top and a lighter brown underneath. Behind its cephalothorax, its abdomen is lighter than its cephalothorax and whitish-yellow underneath. Its legs are light brown with brown leg hairs and spines. The female spider has an epigyne, the visible eternal part of its copulatory organs, that has a large pocket at the rear and, internally, large irregularly-shaped spermathecae. Only the female has been described but it may be that the male of the species has been described but ascribed to a different species.

== Taxonomy and etymology ==
Habrocestum ignorabile is a species of jumping spider, a member of the family Salticidae, that was first described by the arachnologists Wanda Wesołowska and Antonius van Harten in 2007. They allocated the species to the genus Habrocestum, first circumscribed by Eugène Simon in 1886. It was one of over 500 species identified by Wesołowska during her career. Its generic name is derived from a Greek word, habros, meaning 'beauty', and a Latin word cestus, which means 'belt'. Its specific name is based on a Latin word that can be translated 'unknown' and relates to the fact that the species is little known.

In 2015, Wayne Maddison placed the genus in the tribe Hasariini; this is a member of the subclade Saltafresia in the clade Salticoida. The spider is a member of Plexippoida. Phylogenetic analysis of molecular data demonstrates that the genus is closely related to Chinattus and Hasarius. In 2017, Jerzy Prószyński grouped the genus with 32 other genera of jumping spiders under the name Chrysillines in the supergroup Chrysilloida.

== Description ==
Habrocestum ignorabile is a small spider with distinctive characteristics. Its body is divided into two main parts: a forward section, known as its cephalothorax, and, behind that, an oval abdomen. The female has a moderately high carapace, the hard upper part of the cephalothorax, that is typically 1.9 mm (0.07 in) long, 1.4 mm (0.06 in) wide and 0.7 mm (0.03 in) high. It is brown and covered in long brown hairs. It has a black eye field with dense brown bristles near its eyes. The area of the underside of its cephalothorax known as its sternum is light brown. The spider's face, or clypeus, is low and brown. Its mouthparts are brown; its labium have yellowish tips and its maxillae have yellowish inner margins. There are two teeth at the front of its chelicerae and one tooth at the back.

The female spider's abdomen is smaller than its carapace, measuring typically 2 mm (0.08 in) in length and 1.4 mm (0.06 in) in width. It is generally light with a pattern of brownish splashes on its back and a covering of thin fawn and whitish hairs. Underneath, it is yellowish with brown dots found at the back. One specimen was found with parasite mites in its abdmen. The spider has yellow spinnerets that it uses to spin webs. Its legs are light brown with grey sections, long brown leg hairs and long spines. Its pedipalps are yellowish with a blackish spot on its palpal tibia and another on its cambium.

The spider has distinctive copulatory organs. The female’s epigyne, the external visible part of its reproductive organs, has a short, wide pocket at the back and two small copulatory openings at its sides. It has compact large thick-walled spermathecae, or receptacles that are irregularly shaped. Its entire internal structure shows signs of sclerotization. Unlike the related Habrocestum inquinatum, its spermathecae are larger and there are "wings" at the top of its copulatory openings. It can be distinguished from Habrocestum kodigalaensis by its lack of accessory glands. The male has not been described, although Wesołowska and van Harten noted that there were examples of male and female spiders that were found living nearby that were allocated to different species but may be from the same species.

== Distribution ==
Habrocestum spiders have been found across Africa, Asia and Europe. Endemic to Yemen, Habrocestum ignorabile has so far only been found in the Lahej Governorate.
