= Habrocestum virginale =

Scientific classification
- Kingdom: Animalia
- Phylum: Arthropoda
- Subphylum: Chelicerata
- Class: Arachnida
- Order: Araneae
- Infraorder: Araneomorphae
- Family: Salticidae
- Genus: Habrocestum
- Species: H. virginale

Binomial name
- Habrocestum virginale Wesołowska & van Harten, 2007

Species of jumping spider

Habrocestum virginale is a jumping spider species that lives in Yemen. A member of the genus Habrocestum, it is a small spider, between 4 and 4.2 mm (0.16 and 0.17 in) in body length. The forward part of the spider, its cephalothorax, is generally darker brown on top and lighter brown underneath. Behind its cephalothorax, its abdomen is greyish-yellow on top and whitish-yellow underneath, although one specimen had a faint fawn pattern on its upper sides. Its legs are marked with brown leg hairs, dots and patches but are otherwise yellow. The female spider has an epigyne, the visible eternal part of its copulatory organs, that has a convex dip in the middle and a large pocket near the back. Only the female has been described, which is reflected in the specific name, a Latin word that can be translated 'maidenly'. It may be that the male of the species has been described but ascribed to a different species.

== Taxonomy and etymology ==
Habrocestum virginale is a species of jumping spider, a member of the family Salticidae, that was first described by the arachnologists Wanda Wesołowska and Antonius van Harten in 2007. They allocated the species to the genus Habrocestum, first circumscribed by Eugène Simon in 1886. It was one of over 500 species identified by Wesołowska during her career. Its generic name is derived from a Greek word, habros, meaning 'beauty', and a Latin word cestus, which means 'belt'.

In 2015, Wayne Maddison placed the genus in the tribe Hasariini; this is a member of the subclade Saltafresia in the clade Salticoida. The spider is a member of Plexippoida. Phylogenetic analysis of molecular data demonstrates that the genus is closely related to Chinattus and Hasarius. In 2017, Jerzy Prószyński grouped the genus with 32 other genera of jumping spiders under the name Chrysillines in the supergroup Chrysilloida. Its specific name is based on a Latin word that can be translated 'maidenly' and relates to the fact that only the female is known.

== Description ==
Habrocestum virginale is a small spider with distinctive characteristics. Its body is divided into two main parts: a forward section, known as its cephalothorax, and, behind that, an oval abdomen. The female has a high carapace, the hard upper part of the cephalothorax, that is between 2.1 and 2.2 mm (0.08 and 0.09 in) long, between 1.4 and 1.5 mm (0.06 and 0.06 in) wide and typically 0.9 mm (0.04 in) high. It is dark brown with a fovea visible on its back and a covering of thin greyish and brown hairs apart the darker region near its eyes, where long brown fine hairs can be seen. Its foremost eyes are surrounded by fawn scales. The back of the spider's carapace is a steep slope. The underside of its cephalothorax, or sternum, is light brown. The spider's face, or clypeus, is covered in light hairs. Its chelicerae are brown while the remainder of its mouthparts, its labium and its maxillae, are lighter brown with even paler tips.

The female spider's abdomen is smaller than its carapace, measuring between 1.9 and 2 mm (0.07 and 0.08 in) in length and 1.4 and 1.6 mm (0.06 and 0.06 in) in width. It is rounded with greyish-yellow upper surfaces that are covered in light hairs. One specimen that was discovered has a faint pattern on its abdomen consisting of two lighter fawn patches. The underside of its abdomen is whitish-yellow. Its legs are yellow with brown dots and dashes visible on some segments. Its leg hairs are brown and its leg spines are long. Its pedipalps are yellowish and covered in dense white hairs.

The spider has distinctive copulatory organs. The female's epigyne, the external visible part of its reproductive organs, has a slight convex curve in its middle and a large deep pocket to the rear near its epicastric furrow. Its copulatory openings lead via short wide insemination ducts to thick-walled spermathecae, or receptacles. Its accessory glands are distinctively large. The male has not been described, although Wesołowska and van Harten noted that there were examples of male and female spiders that were found living nearby that were allocated to different species but may be from the same species.

== Distribution ==
Habrocestum spiders have been found across Africa, Asia and Europe. Endemic to Yemen, Habrocestum virginale is only found in Al-Mahwit Governorate.
