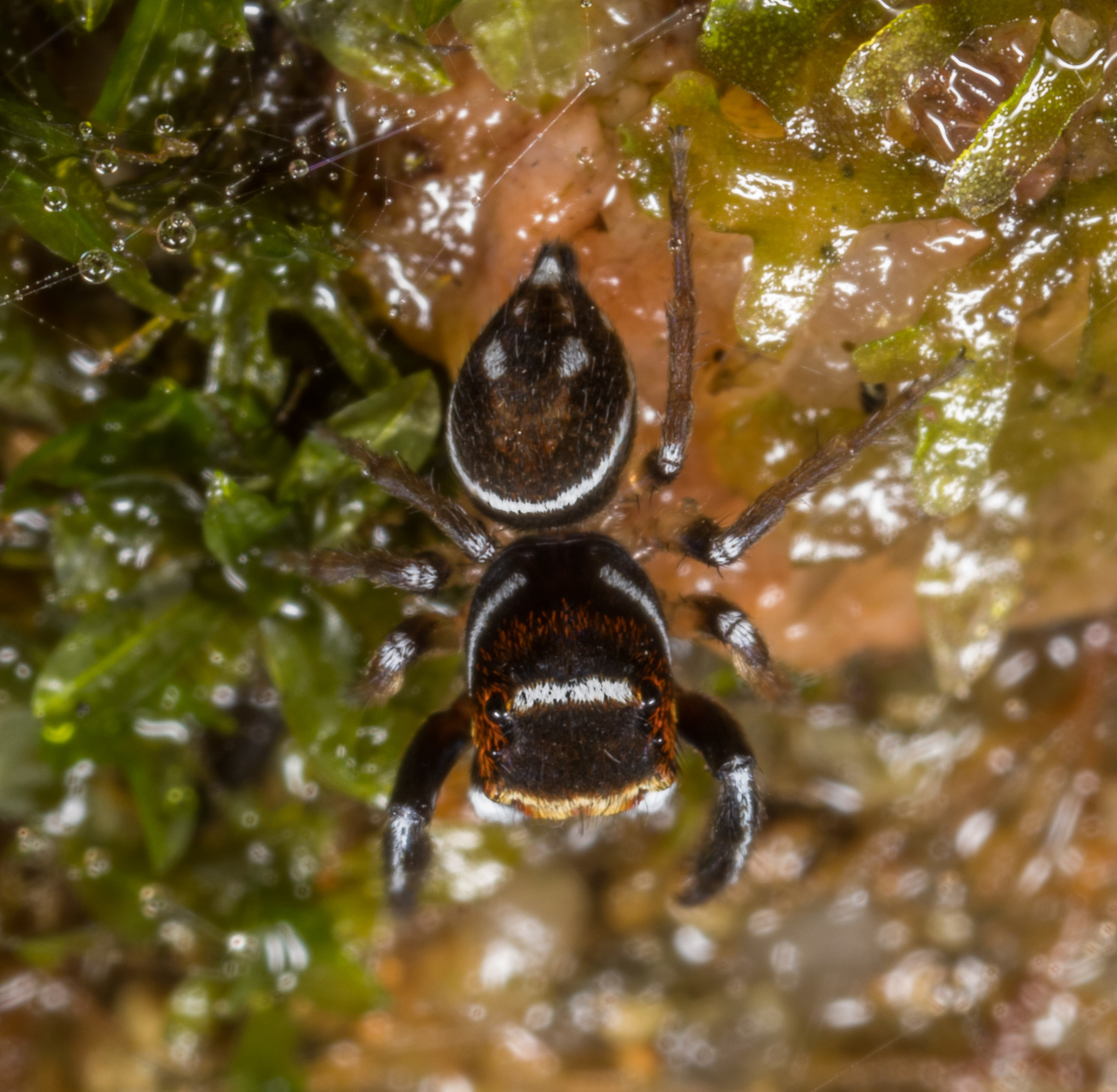
- male from Hong Kong

Scientific classification
- Kingdom: Animalia
- Phylum: Arthropoda
- Subphylum: Chelicerata
- Class: Arachnida
- Order: Araneae
- Infraorder: Araneomorphae
- Family: Salticidae
- Genus: Chinattus
- Species: C. sinensis

Binomial name
- Chinattus sinensis (Prószyński, 1992)

Synonyms
- Habrocestoides sinensis Prószyński, 1992

= Chinattus sinensis =

Chinese Mountain Jumping Spider

Species of spider

Chinattus sinensis, commonly known as the Chinese Mountain Jumping Spider, is a species of jumping spider in the family Salticidae. It is endemic to China.

== Taxonomy ==
The species was originally described by Jerzy Prószyński in 1992 as Habrocestoides sinensis. In 1999, Logunov transferred the species to the genus Chinattus when he redefined Habrocestoides and established Chinattus as a new genus. As of 2021, Logunov suggested that C. sinensis is probably a junior synonym of Chinattus undulatus, though this synonymy has not been formally established.

== Distribution ==
C. sinensis is known from China, where it was first collected in 1948 in "Suisapa" (Shuishanba 水山坝, near Lichuan City), West Hubei. The species appears to be restricted to mountainous regions of China.

== Description ==
Only the male of C. sinensis has been described. The male is a small spider with dull coloration featuring a brown cephalothorax and a greyish abdomen with an indistinct whitish pattern on the posterior portion and a weak semicrescent line in the anterior half.

The frontal aspect shows light yellowish fawn chelicerae and clypeus that contrast with the dark eye field. The pedipalps are brown with a thin streak of white setae running dorsally along the mid-line of the cymbium and tibia. The tibial apophysis is robust and short hook-shaped, while the embolus is relatively thick and characteristically bent. The shape of the bulbus and triangular white area are also distinctive features that help distinguish this species from related taxa.
