= Habrocestum inquinatum =

Scientific classification
- Kingdom: Animalia
- Phylum: Arthropoda
- Subphylum: Chelicerata
- Class: Arachnida
- Order: Araneae
- Infraorder: Araneomorphae
- Family: Salticidae
- Genus: Habrocestum
- Species: H. inquinatum

Binomial name
- Habrocestum inquinatum Wesołowska & van Harten, 2002

Species of jumping spider

Habrocestum inquinatum is a jumping spider species that lives on mainland Yemen and the Socotra Archipelago off the coast of the country. Measuring between 4.1 and 5.2 mm (0.16 and 0.20 in) in body length, the spider has a distinctive pattern on its abdomen, which is recalled in the spider's name that is based on a Latin word that can be translated 'soiled'. The spider is generally brown on top and mainly brown underneath, apart from its abdomen that is yellow. The female's copulatory organs includes large spherical thick-walled receptacles, or spermathecae, that show strong signs of sclerotization and have accessory glands built into its walls. The male has not been described, although there are male spiders that were found near the females of this species that may have been misallocated to new species and in fact be members of this one.

== Taxonomy and etymology ==
Habrocestum inquinatum is a species of jumping spider, a member of the family Salticidae, that was first described by the arachnologists Wanda Wesołowska and Antonius van Harten in 2002. They allocated the species to the genus Habrocestum, first circumscribed by Eugène Simon in 1886. It was one of over 500 species identified by Wesołowska during her career. The spider's generic name is derived from a Greek word, habros, meaning 'beauty', and a Latin word cestus, which means 'belt'. Its specific name is based on a Latin word that can be translated 'soiled' and refers to the pattern on its abdomen.

In 2015, Wayne Maddison placed the genus in the tribe Hasariini; this is a member of the subclade Saltafresia in the clade Salticoida. The spider is a member of Plexippoida. Phylogenetic analysis of molecular data demonstrates that the genus is closely related to Chinattus and Hasarius. In 2017, Jerzy Prószyński grouped the genus with 32 other genera of jumping spiders under the name Chrysillines in the supergroup Chrysilloida.

== Description ==
Habrocestum inquinatum is a small spider with distinctive characteristics. Its body is divided into two main parts: a forward section, known as its cephalothorax, and, behind that, an oval abdomen. The female has a carapace, the hard upper part of the cephalothorax, that is between 2.2 and 2.7 mm (0.09 and 0.11 in) long, between 1.7 and 2.1 mm (0.07 and 0.08 in) wide and between 1.0 and 1.1 mm (0.04 and 0.04 in) high. It is medium height, dark brown and covered in brown and grey hairs with a scattering of long brown bristles. Its eye field is very short and covered in long bristles. The underside of the cephalothorax, or sternum, is light brown. The spider's face, or clypeus, is covered in light hairs. Its chelicerae are brown and the remainder of its mouthparts, its labium and maxillae, are light brown with pale tips.

The female spider's abdomen measures between 1.9 and 2.5 mm (0.07 and 0.10 in) in length and between 1.4 and 1.9 mm (0.06 and 0.07 in) in width. It is generally reddish-brown on top and covered with long brown hairs. The underside is yellow. Some specimens have a pattern of a narrow stripe along its front edge and brownish patches on a yellow background. All the spiders have yellowish spinnerets, used for spinning webs, at the back. Their legs are generally brown with dark brown and yellow segments, with long brown leg hairs and spines.

The spider has distinctive copulatory organs. The female has a small epigyne, the external visible part of its copulatory organs that has a shallow notch right at the back near the epigastric furrow. It has two copulatory openings that lead via narrow insemination ducts to spherical receptacles, or spermathecae, that show strong signs of sclerotization and have wide walls. It has accessory glands are built into the walls of the spermathecae. Some examples lack these glands. The male has not been described, although Wesołowska and van Harten noted that there were examples of male spiders that were found living nearby that were allocated to their own species that may be members of this one.

The spider shares similarities with Habrocestum gibbosum, living in a similar geography and sharing morphological characteristics. Compared to the related Habrocestum ignorabile, it can be distinguished by the smaller size of its spermathecae and the lack of 'wings' on its copulatory openings.

== Distribution ==
Habrocestum spiders have been found across Africa, Asia and Europe. Endemic to Yemen, Habrocestum inquinatum was first found on the island of Socotra and was subsequently seen on the mainland.
