= Habrocestoides =

Scientific classification
- Kingdom: Animalia
- Phylum: Arthropoda
- Subphylum: Chelicerata
- Class: Arachnida
- Order: Araneae
- Infraorder: Araneomorphae
- Family: Salticidae
- Subfamily: Salticinae
- Genus: Habrocestoides; Prószyński, 1992

Type species
- Habrocestoides bengalensis Prószyński, 1992

Species
- See text.

Genus of spiders

Habrocestoides is a genus of the spider family Salticidae (jumping spiders). Most species are endemic to India, with H. phulchokiensis found only in Nepal.

== Name ==
The genus name is an alteration of the salticid genus name Habrocestum with the meaning "having the likeness of Habrocestum".

== Species ==
As of May 2017, the World Spider Catalog lists the following species in the genus:

- Habrocestoides bengalensis Prószyński, 1992 – India
- Habrocestoides darjeelingus Logunov, 1999 – India
- Habrocestoides indicus Prószyński, 1992 – India
- Habrocestoides micans Logunov, 1999 – India
- Habrocestoides nitidus Logunov, 1999 – India
- Habrocestoides phulchokiensis Logunov, 1999 – Nepal
