= Habrocestum dubium =

Scientific classification
- Kingdom: Animalia
- Phylum: Arthropoda
- Subphylum: Chelicerata
- Class: Arachnida
- Order: Araneae
- Infraorder: Araneomorphae
- Family: Salticidae
- Genus: Habrocestum
- Species: H. dubium

Binomial name
- Habrocestum dubium Wesołowska & van Harten, 2002

Species of jumping spider

Habrocestum dubium is a jumping spider species that lives on the Socotra Archipelago off the coast of the Yemen. It is particularly common on the island but has been found nowhere else. Measuring typically 5.7 mm (0.22 in) in body length, the spider is generally brown on top and light brown or yellow underneath. There are short thin hairs on some of its upper surfaces and long brown bristles near the spider's eyes. Its abdomen has a light stripe that runs from the front to the back of its abdomen on the top and a line of dots following in the same direction on the bottom. The spider has relatively long brown legs that have many brown spines. There is a pocket to the rear of the female's epigyne, the visible external part of its copulatory organs. The male has not been described, although there are male spiders that were found near the females of this species that may have been misallocated to new species and in fact be members of this one.

== Taxonomy and etymology ==
Habrocestum dubium is a species of jumping spider, a member of the family Salticidae, that was first described by the arachnologists Wanda Wesołowska and Antony van Harten in 2002. They allocated the species to the genus Habrocestum, first circumscribed by Eugène Simon in 1886. It was one of over 500 species identified by Wesołowska during her career. The generic name is derived from a Greek word, habros, meaning 'beauty', and a Latin word cestus, which means 'belt'. its specific name is based on a Latin word that can be translated 'doubtful'.

In 2015, Wayne Maddison placed the genus in the tribe Hasariini; this is a member of the subclade Saltafresia in the clade Salticoida. The spider is a member of Plexippoida. Phylogenetic analysis of molecular data demonstrates that the genus is closely related to Chinattus and Hasarius. In 2017, Jerzy Prószyński grouped the genus with 32 other genera of jumping spiders under the name Chrysillines in the supergroup Chrysilloida.

== Description ==
Habrocestum dubium is a small spider with distinctive characteristics. Its body is divided into two main parts: a forward section, known as its cephalothorax, and, behind that, an oval abdomen. The female has a carapace, the hard upper part of the cephalothorax, that is typically 3 mm (0.12 in) long, 2.4 mm (0.09 in) wide and 1 mm (0.04 in) high. It is dark brown and covered in short thin hairs. Its eye field is darker and there are long brown bristles near the spider's eyes, The underside of the cephalothorax, or sternum, is light brown. The spider's face, or clypeus, is low and brown. Its chelicerae have two teeth to the front and a single bicuspid teeth to the rear. The remainder of its mouthparts, its labium and maxillae, are light brown.

The male spider's rounded abdomen measures typically 2.7 mm (0.11 in) in length and 2.1 mm (0.08 in) in width. It is generally brownish on top with light stripe that runs down the middle of the upper surface, running from the front to the back, and a yellowish edge at the front. Underneath, it is yellow apart from a streak of brownish dots that runs from the front to the back. Its spinnerets, used for spinning webs, are yellow. The spider has relatively long legs which are brown with brown leg hairs and numerous brown spines.

The spider has distinctive copulatory organs. The female has an epigyne, the external visible part of its copulatory organs, that shows strong signs of sclerotization. Its copulatory openings are to the rear and it has a single pocket right at the back near the eepigastric furrow. The openings lead via narrow insemination ducts to bean-shaped receptacles, or spermathecae. The male has not been described, although Wesołowska and van Harten noted that there were examples of male spiders that were found living nearby that were allocated to their own species that may be members of this one.

== Distribution ==
Habrocestum spiders have been found across Africa, Asia and Europe. Habrocestum dubium is endemic to Yemen. The species is only found on the island of Socotra. The genus is particularly common on the island.
