= Habrocestum luculentum =

Cape Habrocestum Jumping Spider

Scientific classification
- Kingdom: Animalia
- Phylum: Arthropoda
- Subphylum: Chelicerata
- Class: Arachnida
- Order: Araneae
- Infraorder: Araneomorphae
- Family: Salticidae
- Genus: Habrocestum
- Species: H. luculentum

Binomial name
- Habrocestum luculentum G. W. Peckham & E. G. Peckham, 1903

Species of spider

Habrocestum luculentum is a species of spider in the family Salticidae. It is endemic to South Africa and is commonly known as Cape Habrocestum jumping spider.

== Distribution ==
Habrocestum luculentum is found in South Africa, it is presently only known from two recent records, both of which are protected areas: Namaqua National Park (Northern Cape) and Anysberg Nature Reserve (Western Cape).

== Habitat and ecology ==
Habrocestum luculentum inhabits the Succulent Karoo biome at altitudes ranging from 613 to 744 m.

A ground-dwelling spider collected by pitfall trapping. The type locality is situated in the Fynbos biome, so it is likely that this species occurs throughout the coastal regions and adjacent interior in the west of the country.

== Conservation ==
Habrocestum luculentum is listed as Data Deficient for Taxonomic reasons by the South African National Biodiversity Institute. Although the species is protected in the Anysberg Nature Reserve and Namaqua National Park, its status remains obscure and some more sampling is needed to collect the female.

== Taxonomy ==
Habrocestum luculentum was described in 1903, with the type locality only given as Cape Colony. The species was redescribed by Wesołowska in 2012 and by Wesołowska and Haddad in 2018, and is known only from the male.
