= Habrocestum albimanum =

West Coast Habrocestum Jumping Spider

Scientific classification
- Kingdom: Animalia
- Phylum: Arthropoda
- Subphylum: Chelicerata
- Class: Arachnida
- Order: Araneae
- Infraorder: Araneomorphae
- Family: Salticidae
- Genus: Habrocestum
- Species: H. albimanum

Binomial name
- Habrocestum albimanum Simon, 1901

Species of spider

Habrocestum albimanum is a species of spider in the family Salticidae. It is endemic to South Africa and is commonly known as West Coast Habrocestum jumping spider.

== Distribution ==
Habrocestum albimanum is found only in South Africa, where it has been sampled from several localities in the Western Cape, including Cederberg Wilderness Area, Ceres, Malmesbury, and Yzerfontein.

== Habitat and ecology ==
Habrocestum albimanum inhabits the Fynbos biome at altitudes ranging from 141 to 1850 m.

These are free-living ground-dwellers sampled from under plants and with pitfall traps.

== Conservation ==
Habrocestum albimanum is listed as Least Concern by the South African National Biodiversity Institute. Although the species is presently only known from one sex, it has a limited geographical range in the Western Cape but can be locally abundant. There are no known threats and it is protected in the Cederberg Wilderness Area.

== Etymology ==
The specific name is Latin for "white hand".

== Taxonomy ==
Habrocestum albimanum was described by Simon in 1901, with the type locality only given as "Bona Spei" (Cape of Good Hope). The species was redescribed by Wesołowska and Haddad in 2013 and is known only from the male.
