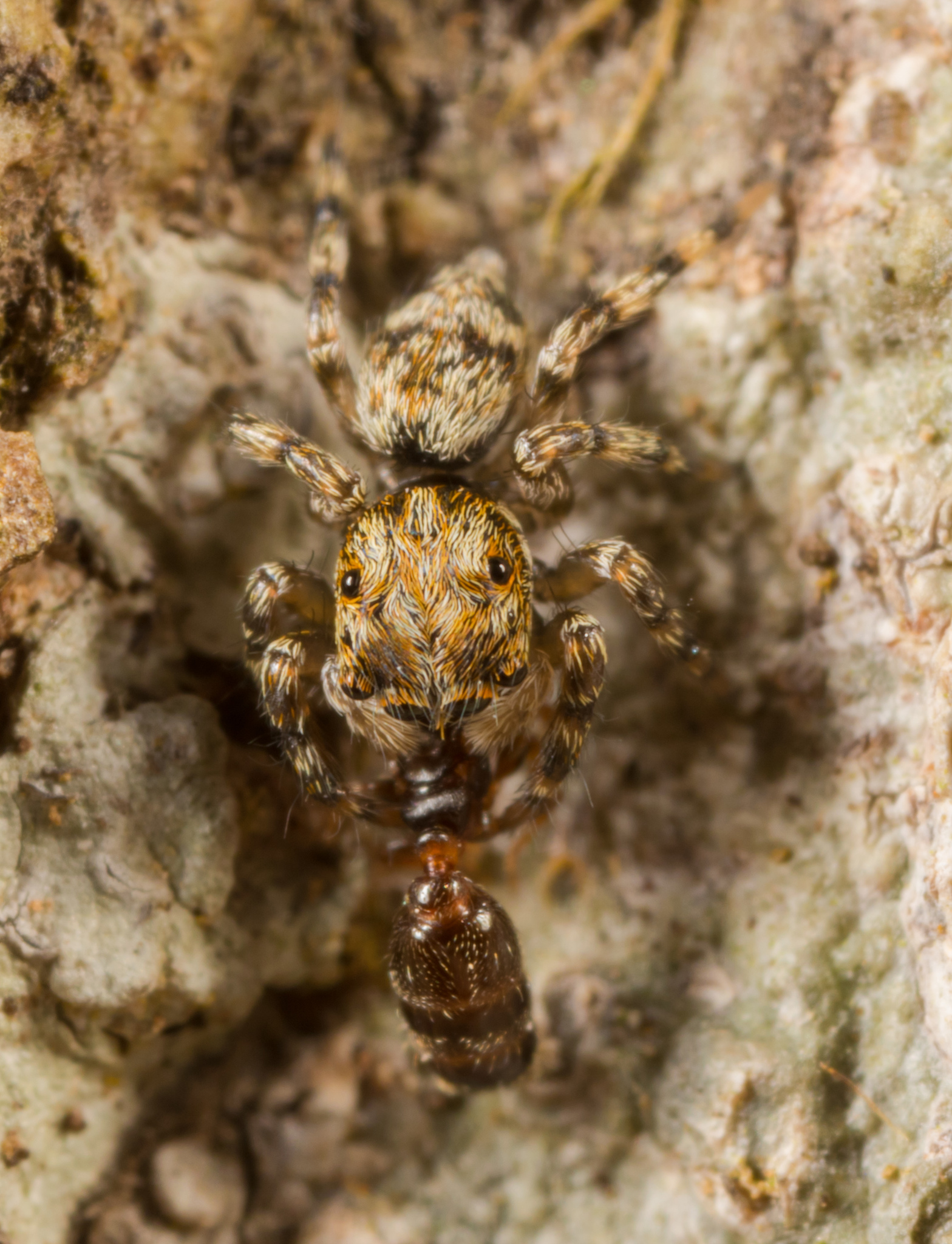
- male eating an ant

Scientific classification
- Kingdom: Animalia
- Phylum: Arthropoda
- Subphylum: Chelicerata
- Class: Arachnida
- Order: Araneae
- Infraorder: Araneomorphae
- Family: Salticidae
- Genus: Habrocestum
- Species: H. hongkongiense

Binomial name
- Habrocestum hongkongiense Prószyński, 1992

= Habrocestum hongkongiense =

Species of spider

Habrocestum hongkongiense is a species of jumping spider in the genus Habrocestum. It is found in China.

== Taxonomy ==
The species was first described by Jerzy Prószyński in 1992 based on a male holotype collected in Hong Kong in 1976. The female remains unknown.

== Distribution ==
H. hongkongiense has been recorded from China, specifically from Hong Kong where the type specimen was collected.

== Description ==
H. hongkongiense is a small jumping spider with the typical abdominal pattern of the genus Habrocestum, featuring two large white spots that in this species are fused together. The male has a dark brown cephalothorax with an indistinct median longitudinal line of white setae, and white hairs arranged in transverse lines on the eye field that form a white spot behind the junction of the anterior median eyes.

The male's first leg shows distinctive coloration with a dark brown femur, dorsally yellow patella, and a brown tibia that has a lighter yellow spot with white setae on the dorsal surface. The palpal organ is comparable to other Habrocestum species but differs in having two tibial apophyses and a long, slightly wavy embolus.
