= Habrocestum flavimanum =

Cape Habrocestum Jumping Spider

Scientific classification
- Kingdom: Animalia
- Phylum: Arthropoda
- Subphylum: Chelicerata
- Class: Arachnida
- Order: Araneae
- Infraorder: Araneomorphae
- Family: Salticidae
- Genus: Habrocestum
- Species: H. flavimanum

Binomial name
- Habrocestum flavimanum Simon, 1901

Synonyms
- Habrocestum flavimanus Simon, 1901

Species of spider

Habrocestum flavimanum is a species of spider in the family Salticidae. It is endemic to South Africa and is commonly known as Cape Habrocestum jumping spider.

== Distribution ==
Habrocestum flavimanum is found only in South Africa, where is known only from the type locality, "Bonae Spei" (Cape of Good Hope), referring to the southwestern parts of the Western Cape, with no exact locality specified.

== Habitat and ecology ==
Likely sampled from the Fynbos biome.

== Conservation ==
Habrocestum flavimanum is listed as Data Deficient by the South African National Biodiversity Institute. The type locality is unknown and the status of the species remains obscure, as it has never been redescribed or collected again.

== Etymology ==
The specific name is Latin for "yellow hand".

== Taxonomy ==
Habrocestum flavimanum was described in 1901 from "Bona Spei" (Cape of Good Hope) and is known only from the male.
