= Habrocestum superbum =

Zimbabwe Habrocestum Jumping Spider

Scientific classification
- Kingdom: Animalia
- Phylum: Arthropoda
- Subphylum: Chelicerata
- Class: Arachnida
- Order: Araneae
- Infraorder: Araneomorphae
- Family: Salticidae
- Genus: Habrocestum
- Species: H. superbum

Binomial name
- Habrocestum superbum Wesołowska, 2000

Species of spider

Habrocestum superbum is a species of spider in the family Salticidae. It is found in southern Africa and is commonly known as Zimbabwe Habrocestum jumping spider.

== Distribution ==
Habrocestum superbum is found in South Africa (Limpopo) and Zimbabwe.

== Habitat and ecology ==
Habrocestum superbum is a free-living ground dweller that inhabits the Savanna biome at an altitude of 409 m.

== Conservation ==
Habrocestum superbum is listed as Least Concern by the South African National Biodiversity Institute due to its wide geographical range in southern Africa. The species has been recorded from a single locality in the Soutpansberg Mountains.

== Taxonomy ==
Habrocestum superbum was described in 2000 from Zimbabwe, with additional information provided by Wesołowska and Cumming in 2011.
