= Habrocestum personatum =

Scientific classification
- Kingdom: Animalia
- Phylum: Arthropoda
- Subphylum: Chelicerata
- Class: Arachnida
- Order: Araneae
- Infraorder: Araneomorphae
- Family: Salticidae
- Genus: Habrocestum
- Species: H. personatum

Binomial name
- Habrocestum personatum Wesołowska & Russell-Smith, 2011

Species of spider

Habrocestum personatum is a jumping spider species that lives in Nigeria. It was first described in 2011.
