= Habrocestum mboki =

Scientific classification
- Kingdom: Animalia
- Phylum: Arthropoda
- Subphylum: Chelicerata
- Class: Arachnida
- Order: Araneae
- Infraorder: Araneomorphae
- Family: Salticidae
- Genus: Habrocestum
- Species: H. mboki

Binomial name
- Habrocestum mboki Wesołowska, Russell-Smith & Danflous, 2026

Species of jumping spider

Habrocestum mboki is a species of jumping spider in the genus Habrocestum that lives in Central African Republic.
