= Habrocestum speciosum =

Scientific classification
- Kingdom: Animalia
- Phylum: Arthropoda
- Subphylum: Chelicerata
- Class: Arachnida
- Order: Araneae
- Infraorder: Araneomorphae
- Family: Salticidae
- Genus: Habrocestum
- Species: H. speciosum

Binomial name
- Habrocestum speciosum Wesołowska & van Harten, 1994

Species of jumping spider

Habrocestum speciosum is a jumping spider species that lives on the Socotra Archipelago off the coast of the Yemen. A small spider, typically of 4.4 mm (0.17 in) total body length. It has a dark brown forward section, or carapace, and, behind that, a yellowish abdomen that is marked with a pattern of dark brown overlapping patches. There are long brown bristles near the spider's eyes and, while the spinnerets that it uses to spin webs are universally yellowish, its legs consist of lighter and darker brown sections. Its copulatory organs are distinctive, including that the male has a small hooked spike, or tibial apophysis, on its palpal tibia and a bulge on the bottom of its palpal bulb. The female has not been described, although there are female spiders that were found near the male specimen that may have been misallocated to new species and in fact be members of this one.

== Taxonomy and etymology ==
Habrocestum speciosum is a species of jumping spider, a member of the family Salticidae, that was first described by the arachnologists Wanda Wesołowska and Antonius van Harten in 1994. They allocated the species to the genus Habrocestum, first circumscribed by Eugène Simon in 1886. It was one of over 500 species identified by Wesołowska during her career. The spider's generic name is derived from a Greek word, habros, meaning 'beauty', and a Latin word cestus, which means 'belt'. Its specific name is based on a Latin word that can be translated 'beautiful' or 'splendid'. The holotype is kept at the Royal Museum for Central Africa in Tervuren.

In 2015, Wayne Maddison placed the genus in the tribe Hasariini; this is a member of the subclade Saltafresia in the clade Salticoida. The spider is a member of Plexippoida. Phylogenetic analysis of molecular data demonstrates that the genus is closely related to Chinattus and Hasarius. In 2017, Jerzy Prószyński grouped the genus with 32 other genera of jumping spiders under the name Chrysillines in the supergroup Chrysilloida.

== Description ==
Habrocestum speciosum is a small spider with distinctive characteristics. Its body is divided into two main parts: a forward section, known as its cephalothorax, and, behind that, an oval abdomen. The female has an oval carapace, the hard upper part of the cephalothorax, that is typically 2.3 mm (0.09 in) long, 1.7 mm (0.07 in) wide and 1.0 mm (0.04 in) high. Convex in shape with a broad middle, it is dark brown and has tiny light hairs on its sides. Its eye field is short and there are long brown bristles near the spider's eyes. The underside of the cephalothorax, or sternum, is brown. The spider's face, or clypeus is low. Its main mouthparts, its labium and maxillae, are light brown with pale edges and its chelicerae are dark brown and have two teeth to the front and a single bicuspid tooth to the rear.

The male spider's narrow abdomen measures typically 2.1 mm (0.08 in) in length and between 1.4 mm (0.06 in) in width. It is generally yellowish on top, covered in hairs and has a pattern of a brownish-black pattern consisting of three overlapping patches towards the middle. It has yellowish sides but, underneath, it is darker. It has dark book lung covers and yellowish spinnerets, used for spinning webs. Its front legs are brown with lighter sections. Its remaining legs are all light brown with darker sections. All have brown leg hairs and long brown spines.

The spider has distinctive copulatory organs. The male has hairy pedipalps that ends with a very short hooked spike, or tibial apophysis, on its palpal tibia. At the end of this is a slightly bulbous rounded hairy cymbium, to which is attached a smaller elongated palpal bulb that has an bulge on its bottom and a very fine embolus that projects from the top. The female has not been described, although Wesołowska and van Harten noted that there were examples of female spiders that were found living nearby that were allocated to their own species that may be members of this one.

== Distribution ==
Habrocestum spiders have been found across Africa, Asia and Europe. Habrocestum speciosum is endemic to the Socotra Archipelago off the coast of Yemen and has been found on the islands of Darsah and Socotra.
