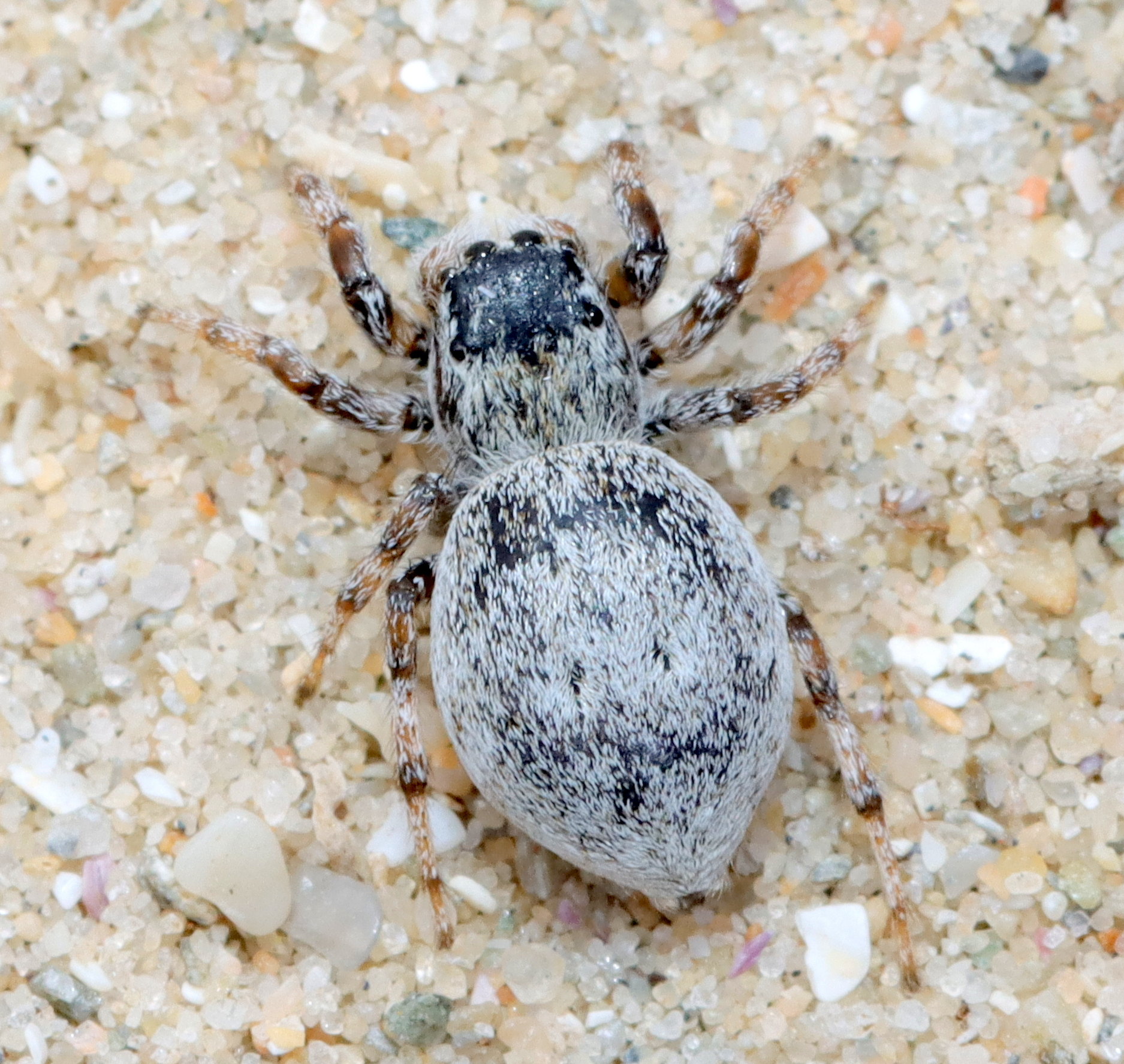

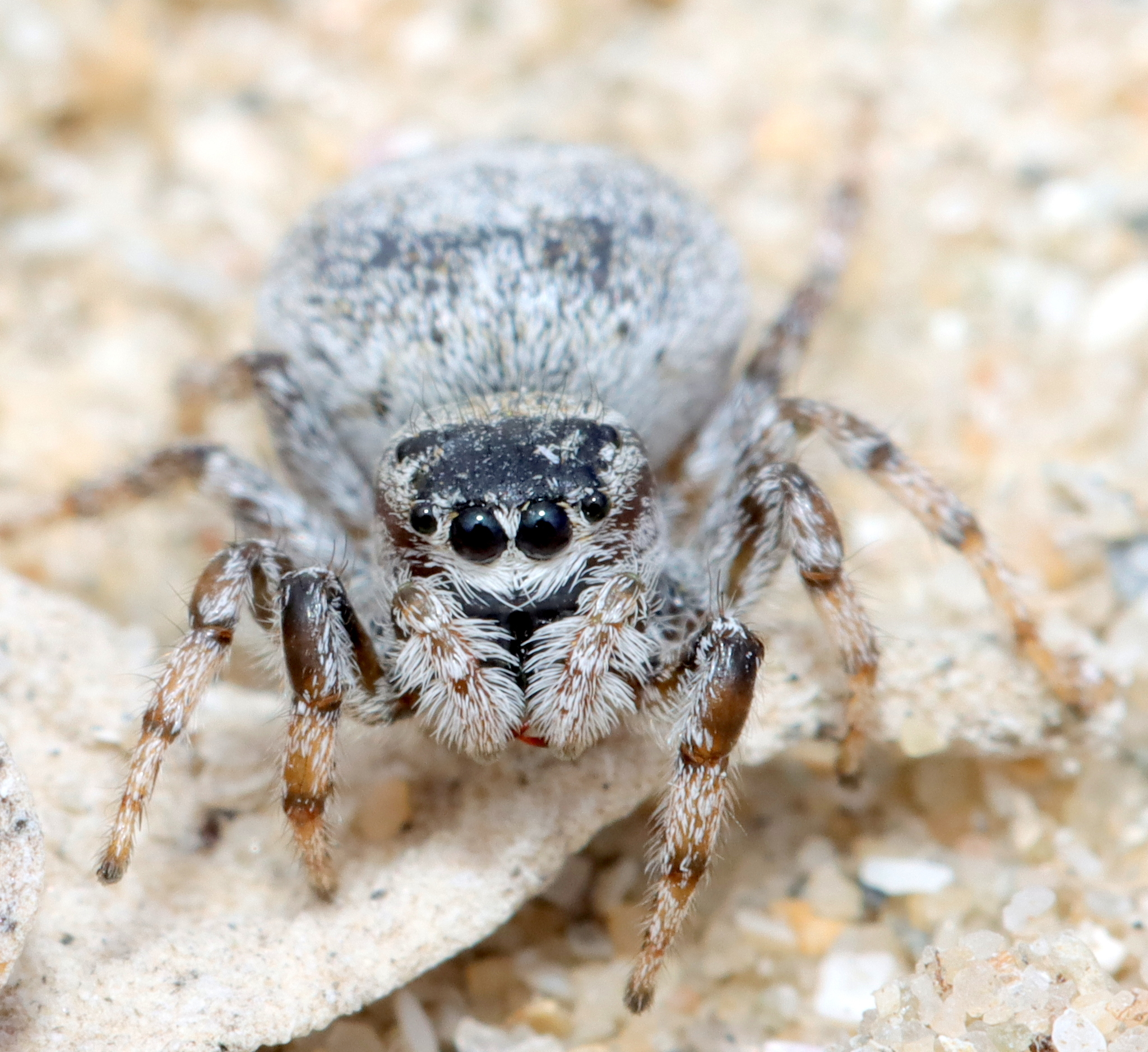

Scientific classification
- Kingdom: Animalia
- Phylum: Arthropoda
- Subphylum: Chelicerata
- Class: Arachnida
- Order: Araneae
- Infraorder: Araneomorphae
- Family: Salticidae
- Genus: Habrocestum
- Species: H. laurae

Binomial name
- Habrocestum laurae G. W. Peckham & E. G. Peckham, 1903

= Habrocestum laurae =

Laura's Habrocestum Jumping Spider

Species of spider

Habrocestum laurae is a species of spider in the family Salticidae. It is endemic to South Africa and is commonly known as Laura's Habrocestum jumping spider.

== Distribution ==
Habrocestum laurae is found only in South Africa, where it is presently known from only two provinces, KwaZulu-Natal (Durban) and Eastern Cape (Thyspunt, 12 km WNW Cape St Francis).

== Habitat and ecology ==
Habrocestum laurae inhabits the Indian Ocean Coastal Belt and Thicket biomes at altitudes of 17 m.

The species is a free-living ground-dweller.

== Conservation ==
Habrocestum laurae is listed as Data Deficient by the South African National Biodiversity Institute. The status of the species remains obscure and some more sampling is needed to collect the male and determine the species' range.

== Taxonomy ==
Habrocestum laurae was described in 1903 from Durban and is known only from the female, with Prószyński providing more information in 1987.
