= Habrocestum albopunctatum =

Scientific classification
- Kingdom: Animalia
- Phylum: Arthropoda
- Subphylum: Chelicerata
- Class: Arachnida
- Order: Araneae
- Infraorder: Araneomorphae
- Family: Salticidae
- Genus: Habrocestum
- Species: H. albopunctatum

Binomial name
- Habrocestum albopunctatum Wesołowska & van Harten, 2002

Species of jumping spider

Habrocestum albopunctatum is a jumping spider species that lives on the Socotra Archipelago off the coast of the Yemen. Measuring typically 4 mm (0.16 in) in body length, the spider is marked by a distinctive pattern of white dots on its abdomen that are recalled in its specific name, which can be translated 'white dotted'. It is a hairy spider, covered in brown and white hairs, with some long brown bristles found scattered amongst them. The spider's face, or clypeus, is marked by a stripe of yellow hairs and, at its base another thinner stripe. It has a single bifurcated tooth to the rear of its chelicerae, which helps to distinguish the spider from others in the genus. Otherwise, it is necessary to study the male's copulatory organs, particularly its S-shaped embolus and the shape of the bulges on its irregularly-shaped tegulum. The female has not been described.

== Taxonomy and etymology ==
Habrocestum albopunctatum is a species of jumping spider, a member of the family Salticidae, that was first described by the arachnologists Wanda Wesołowska and Antony van Harten in 2002. They allocated the species to the genus Habrocestum, first circumscribed by Eugène Simon in 1886. It was one of over 500 species identified by Wesołowska during her career. Its generic name is derived from a Greek word, habros, meaning 'beauty', and a Latin word cestus, which means 'belt'. Its specific name is based on two Latin words, albus and punctatus, which can be translated 'white dotted'. This refers to the pattern on the spider's abdomen.

In 2015, Wayne Maddison placed the genus in the tribe Hasarini; this is a member of the subclade Saltafresia in the clade Salticoida. Phylogenetic analysis of molecular data demonstrates that the genus is closely related to Chinattus and Hasarius. In 2017, Jerzy Prószyński grouped the genus with 32 other genera of jumping spiders under the name Chrysillines in the supergroup Chrysilloida.

== Description ==
Habrocestum albopunctatum is a small spider with distinctive characteristics. Its body is divided into two main parts: a forward section, known as its cephalothorax, and, behind that, an oval abdomen. The male has a carapace, the hard upper part of the cephalothorax, that is typically 2.2 mm (0.09 in) long and 1.8 mm (0.07 in) wide. It is brownish-fawn and covered in dense brown hairs. It has a dark brown area at the front, its eye field, and a darker slope to the rear. There are long brown bristles near the spider's eyes, the forward most eyes also has small fawnish-orange scales around them. The underside of the cephalothorax, or sternum, is light brown. The spider's face, or clypeus, is marked by a stripe of yellow hairs. There is another narrower line at the base of its clypeus and above its chelicerae. The remainder of its mouthparts, its labium and maxillae, are light brown with paler tips. The spider has a curved fang at the front of its mouth, a single bifurcated tooth at the rear of its chelicerae and two smaller teeth to the front.

The male spider's abdomen measures typically 1.8 mm in length and 1.3 mm (0.05 in) in width. It is broadest halfway along its length. It has an unusual irregular pattern on its top surface, consisting of four brown patches, the rear two being darker and containing white dots. The front is white but has a black slope. The entire surface is covered by brown and white hairs, interspersed with a scattering of long brown bristles. The underside of its abdomen is yellowish-grey. The spider has brownish-grey spinnerets. Its legs are orangish-brown with dark rings apart from the foremost pair, which are brown with darker femora and lighter tarsi. They have dense brownish hairs and many long brown spines.

The spider has distinctive copulatory organs. The male's pedipalps, sensory organs near the spider's face, are covered in long brown hairs. They end with a tibia that has a curved appendage, or apophysis, that juts out and runs alongside its cymbium, fitting inside an indentation in its surface. The cymbium is rather pear-shaped with a narrow base and top. Next to the cymbium is an irregularly-shaped palpal bulb that has a distinctively-shaped large tegulum that has a large bulge at the bottom and another cone-shaped bulge near the top. Out of the top extends a long and thin embolus that forms an S-shape.

The shape of its embolus, and its length of its tibial apophysis, are the characteristics that most easily distinguish the species from others in the genus. Although its embolus is similar to the related Habrocestum imilchang, it can be distinguished by the cone-shaped bulge on its tegulum and its bifurcated tooth. The female has not been described, although Wesołowska and van Harten noted that there were examples of female spiders that were found living nearby that were allocated to their own species that may be members of this one.

== Distribution ==
Although Habrocestum spiders have been found across Africa, Asia and Europe, Habrocestum albopunctatum is endemic to Yemen. The species is only found on the island of Socotra. The genus is particularly common on the island.
