= Habrocestum namibicum =

Scientific classification
- Kingdom: Animalia
- Phylum: Arthropoda
- Subphylum: Chelicerata
- Class: Arachnida
- Order: Araneae
- Infraorder: Araneomorphae
- Family: Salticidae
- Genus: Habrocestum
- Species: H. namibicum

Binomial name
- Habrocestum namibicum Wesołowska, 2006

Species of spider

Habrocestum namibicum is a jumping spider species in the genus Habrocestum that lives in Namibia. It was first described by Wanda Wesołowska in 2006.
