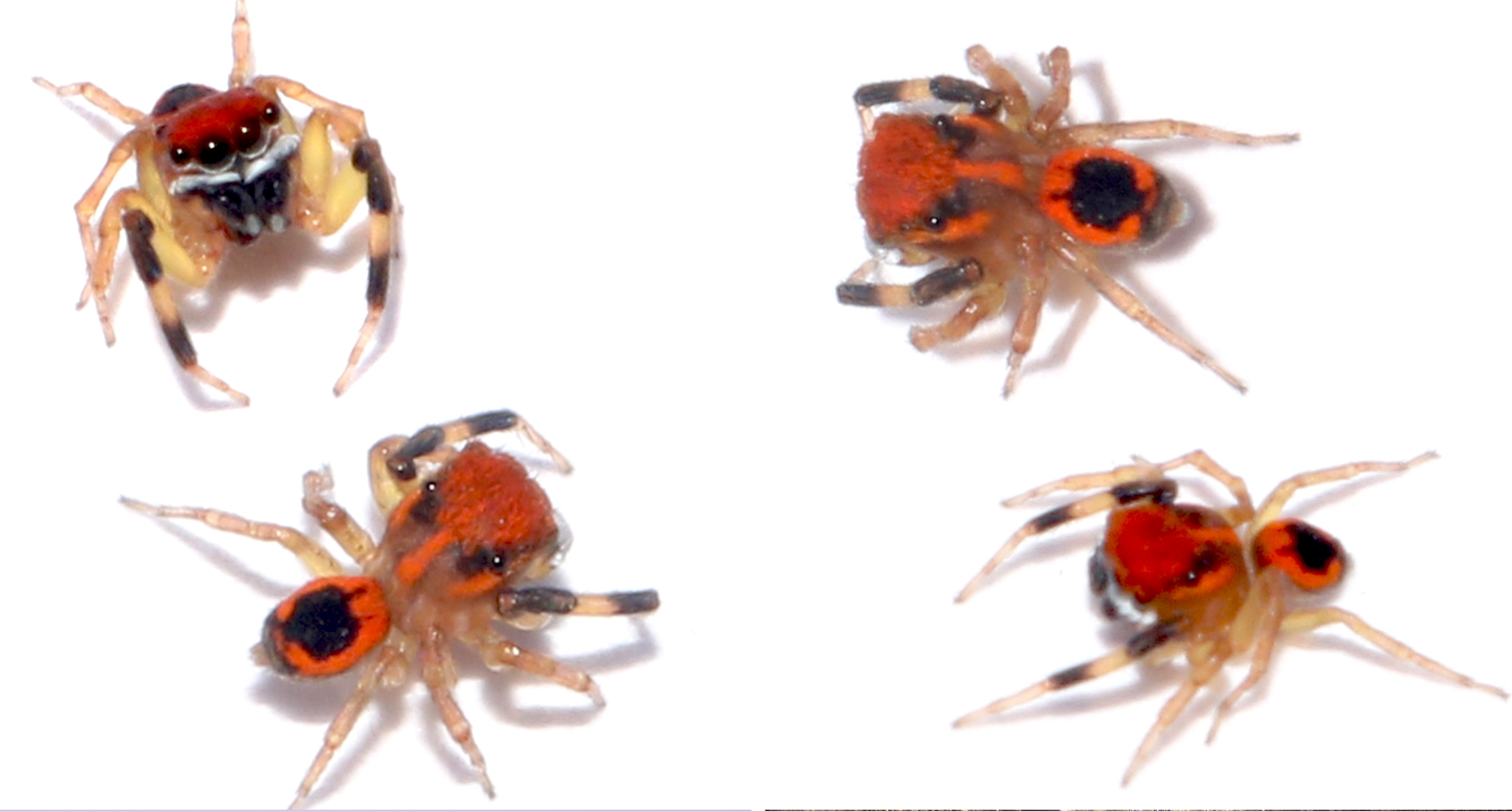

Scientific classification
- Kingdom: Animalia
- Phylum: Arthropoda
- Subphylum: Chelicerata
- Class: Arachnida
- Order: Araneae
- Infraorder: Araneomorphae
- Family: Salticidae
- Genus: Habrocestum
- Species: H. togansangmai

Binomial name
- Habrocestum togansangmai Kadam & Tripathi, 2023

= Habrocestum togansangmai =

Species of spider

Habrocestum togansangmai is a jumping spider species in the genus Habrocestum that found in Meghalaya Northeast India. It was first described in 2023.
