= Chinattus taiwanensis =

Scientific classification
- Kingdom: Animalia
- Phylum: Arthropoda
- Subphylum: Chelicerata
- Class: Arachnida
- Order: Araneae
- Infraorder: Araneomorphae
- Family: Salticidae
- Genus: Chinattus
- Species: C. taiwanensis

Binomial name
- Chinattus taiwanensis Bao & Peng, 2002

Species of spider

Chinattus taiwanensis is a species of jumping spider (family Salticidae) found exclusively in Taiwan.

This spider has a body length (excluding legs) of 3.9 mm. The carapace is dark brown, black towards the margins; the legs and the roughly cylindrical abdomen are greyish-black, the latter marked dorsally with four depressions and five pale curved bands and laterally with numerous diagonal black lines.

It can be distinguished from the similar Chinattus validus by the shape of the palps.
