= Habrocestum sapiens =

Zimbabwe Habrocestum Jumping Spider

Scientific classification
- Kingdom: Animalia
- Phylum: Arthropoda
- Subphylum: Chelicerata
- Class: Arachnida
- Order: Araneae
- Infraorder: Araneomorphae
- Family: Salticidae
- Genus: Habrocestum
- Species: H. sapiens

Binomial name
- Habrocestum sapiens (G. W. Peckham & E. G. Peckham, 1903)

Synonyms
- Saitis sapiens Peckham & Peckham, 1903

Species of spider

Habrocestum sapiens is a species of spider in the family Salticidae. It is found in southern Africa and is commonly known as Zimbabwe Habrocestum jumping spider.

== Distribution ==
Habrocestum sapiens is found in Zimbabwe and South Africa.

In South Africa, it is known only from the De Hoop Nature Reserve in Western Cape province.

== Habitat and ecology ==
Habrocestum sapiens is a free-living ground dweller that inhabits the Fynbos biome at altitudes of 15 m.

== Conservation ==
Habrocestum sapiens is listed as Least Concern by the South African National Biodiversity Institute due to its wide geographical range in southern Africa. There are no known threats and the species is protected in the De Hoop Nature Reserve.

== Taxonomy ==
Habrocestum sapiens was originally described in 1903 as Saitis sapiens from Zimbabwe and is known only from the male. The species is misplaced and belongs in Evarcha, but its transfer has not yet been formalized. The South African specimens may be misidentified.
