= Habrocestum ferrugineum =

Scientific classification
- Kingdom: Animalia
- Phylum: Arthropoda
- Subphylum: Chelicerata
- Class: Arachnida
- Order: Araneae
- Infraorder: Araneomorphae
- Family: Salticidae
- Genus: Habrocestum
- Species: H. ferrugineum

Binomial name
- Habrocestum ferrugineum Wesołowska & van Harten, 2002

Species of jumping spider

Habrocestum ferrugineum is a jumping spider species that lives on the Socotra Archipelago off the coast of the Yemen. Measuring between 6.1 and 7.1 mm (0.24 and 0.28 in) in body length, the spider is generally rusty-brown on top, which is recalled in the spider's name that is based on a Latin word that can be translated 'rust coloured'. There are short thin hairs on some of its upper surfaces and long brown bristles near the spider's eyes. The spider has yellowish-orange legs that have many brown spines. There is a shallow notch to the rear of the female's epigyne, the visible external part of its copulatory organs. The male has not been described, although there are male spiders that were found near the females of this species that may have been misallocated to new species and in fact be members of this one.

== Taxonomy and etymology ==
Habrocestum ferrugineum is a species of jumping spider, a member of the family Salticidae, that was first described by the arachnologists Wanda Wesołowska and Antonius van Harten in 2002. They allocated the species to the genus Habrocestum, first circumscribed by Eugène Simon in 1886. It was one of over 500 species identified by Wesołowska during her career. Its generic name is derived from a Greek word, habros, meaning 'beauty', and a Latin word cestus, which means 'belt'. its specific name is based on a Latin word that can be translated 'rust coloured' and refers to the general colour of the spider.

In 2015, Wayne Maddison placed the genus in the tribe Hasariini; this is a member of the subclade Saltafresia in the clade Salticoida. The spider is a member of Plexippoida. Phylogenetic analysis of molecular data demonstrates that the genus is closely related to Chinattus and Hasarius. In 2017, Jerzy Prószyński grouped the genus with 32 other genera of jumping spiders under the name Chrysillines in the supergroup Chrysilloida.

== Description ==
Habrocestum ferrugineum is a small spider with distinctive characteristics. Its body is divided into two main parts: a forward section, known as its cephalothorax, and, behind that, an oval abdomen. The female has a carapace, the hard upper part of the cephalothorax, that is between 3.2 and 3.4 mm (0.13 and 0.13 in) long, between 2.5 and 2.7 mm (0.10 and 0.11 in) wide and between 1.2 and 1.3 mm (0.05 and 0.05 in) high. It is rusty-brown and covered in short red and grey hairs. Its eye field is short, wide and covered in long bristles, The underside of the cephalothorax, or sternum, is yellow. The spider's face, or clypeus, is covered in light hairs. Its chelicerae have two teeth to the front and a single bicuspid teeth to the rear. The remainder of its mouthparts, its labium and maxillae, have yellow tips but are mainly brownish.

The female spider's rounded abdomen measures between 2.9 and 3.7 mm (0.11 and 0.15 in) in length and between 2 and 2.3 mm (0.08 and 0.09 in) in width. It is generally rusty-brown on top and covered in brown and reddish hairs, amongst which are a scattering of long brownish bristles. At least one specimen has a symmetrical spiky dark brown pattern on its back. All the spiders are yellow underneath and have yellowish spinnerets, used for spinning webs, at the back. Their legs are yellowish-orange, some segments darker than other, with brown leg hairs and numerous long brown spines.

The spider has distinctive copulatory organs. The female has a small epigyne, the external visible part of its copulatory organs that has a shallow notch right at the back near the eepigastric furrow. It has two copulatory openings that lead via narrow insemination ducts to receptacles, or spermathecae that show strong signs of sclerotization. The is also slight sign of sclerotization evident in the initial part of the ducts, which are also very narrow. . The male has not been described, although Wesołowska and van Harten noted that there were examples of male spiders that were found living nearby that were allocated to their own species that may be members of this one.

== Distribution ==
Habrocestum spiders have been found across Africa, Asia and Europe. Endemic to Yemen, Habrocestum ferrugineum is only found on the island of Socotra.
