= Habrocestum gibbosum =

Scientific classification
- Kingdom: Animalia
- Phylum: Arthropoda
- Subphylum: Chelicerata
- Class: Arachnida
- Order: Araneae
- Infraorder: Araneomorphae
- Family: Salticidae
- Genus: Habrocestum
- Species: H. gibbosum

Binomial name
- Habrocestum gibbosum Wesołowska & van Harten, 2007

Species of jumping spider

Habrocestum gibbosum is a jumping spider species that lives on the Socotra Archipelago off the coast of the Yemen. It is a small spider, typically 3.6 mm (0.14 in) in body length with a distinctive greyish-yellow abdomen that has a covering of thin light hairs and brown bristles. There are also lighter grey hairs on the middle of its eye field and longer bristles and yellowish scales near its eyes. The male's copulatory organs include a ribbon-like embolus at the end of its palpal bulb. The shape of the bulb is also distinctive. The female has not been described, although there are female spiders that were found living nearby that were given different names that may be from this species.

== Taxonomy and etymology ==
Habrocestum gibbosum is a species of jumping spider, a member of the family Salticidae, that was first described by the arachnologists Wanda Wesołowska and Antonius van Harten in 2007. They allocated the species to the genus Habrocestum, first circumscribed by Eugène Simon in 1886. It was one of over 500 species identified by Wesołowska during her career. Its generic name is derived from a Greek word, habros, meaning 'beauty', and a Latin word cestus, which means 'belt'. Its specific name, which was originally gibbose, is based on a Latin word that can be translated 'with a hump'.

In 2015, Wayne Maddison placed the genus in the tribe Hasariini; this is a member of the subclade Saltafresia in the clade Salticoida. The spider is a member of Plexippoida. Phylogenetic analysis of molecular data demonstrates that the genus is closely related to Chinattus and Hasarius. In 2017, Jerzy Prószyński grouped the genus with 32 other genera of jumping spiders under the name Chrysillines in the supergroup Chrysilloida.

== Description ==
Habrocestum gibbosum is a small spider with distinctive characteristics. Its body is divided into two main parts: a forward section, known as its cephalothorax, and, behind that, an oval abdomen. The male has a carapace, the hard upper part of the cephalothorax, that is typically 2 mm (0.08 in) long, 1.4 mm (0.06 in) wide and 1 mm (0.04 in) high. It is dark brown with a broad white stripe that runs from the middle to the back. It has a short black eye field. There are brown hairs on its carapace, lighter grey hairs on the middle of its eye field and longer bristles and yellowish scales near its eyes. The underside of the cephalothorax, or sternum, is yellow. The spider's face, or clypeus, is low, brown and with few white bristles. Its chelicerae is light brown, its labium is dark brown and its maxillae is orange with paler tips.

The male spider's abdomen is smaller than its carapace, measuring typicall 1.6 mm (0.06 in) in length and 1.1 mm (0.04 in) in width. It is rounded with a greyish-yellow upper surface that is covered in thin light hairs and brown bristles. The underside of its abdomen is whitish-yellow. Its spinnerets are yellow. It front pair of legs have black and yellow femora, brown patellae and tibiae, and yellow metatarsi and tarsi. Its leg hairs are thin and light while its spines are long and brown. The coloration of its abdomen helps distinguish the spider from others in the genus.

The spider has distinctive copulatory organs. It light yellow pedipalps that end with a long spike on its tibia, or tibial apophysis. Its elongated palpal bulb is topped by a ribbon-like embolus. Its copulatory organs are very similar to Habrocestum papilionaceum, differing in its shorter and narrower embolus. The female has not been described, although Wesołowska and van Harten noted that there were examples of male and female spiders that were found living nearby that were allocated to different species but may be from the same species. It can be differentiated from other members of its genus by the light slope of the spider's carapace and the design of its palpal bulb.

== Distribution ==
Habrocestum spiders have been found across Africa, Asia and Europe. Endemic to Yemen, Habrocestum gibbosum is only found on the island of Socotra.
