= Habrocestum socotrense =

Scientific classification
- Kingdom: Animalia
- Phylum: Arthropoda
- Subphylum: Chelicerata
- Class: Arachnida
- Order: Araneae
- Infraorder: Araneomorphae
- Family: Salticidae
- Genus: Habrocestum
- Species: H. socotrense

Binomial name
- Habrocestum socotrense Wesołowska & van Harten, 2002

Species of jumping spider

Habrocestum socotrense is a jumping spider species that lives on the Socotra Archipelago off the coast of the Yemen, a feature that is recalled in its specific name. A small spider, typically 7.4 mm (0.29 in) in body length, it is generally brown or dark brown apart from a pattern of a white stripe and yellow patches on the top of its abdomen and a brown stripe on a yellow background underneath. Its legs are mainly orangish-brown but have darker rings and brown and grey hairs on them. Its copulatory organs are distinctive. The male has a small wide spike, or tibial apophysis, on its palpal tibia and an anvil-like bulge on the bottom of its palpal bulb. The female has not been described, although there are female spiders that were found near the males of this species that may have been misallocated to new species and in fact be members of this one.

== Taxonomy and etymology ==
Habrocestum socotrense is a species of jumping spider, a member of the family Salticidae, that was first described by the arachnologists Wanda Wesołowska and Antony van Harten in 2002. They allocated the species to the genus Habrocestum, first circumscribed by Eugène Simon in 1886. It was one of over 500 species identified by Wesołowska during her career. Its generic name is derived from a Greek word, habros, meaning 'beauty', and a Latin word cestus, which means 'belt'. Its specific name is based on the name of the island of Socotra where the spider was first found.

In 2015, Wayne Maddison placed the genus in the tribe Hasarini; this is a member of the subclade Saltafresia in the clade Salticoida. Phylogenetic analysis of molecular data demonstrates that the genus is closely related to Chinattus and Hasarius. In 2017, Jerzy Prószyński grouped the genus with 32 other genera of jumping spiders under the name Chrysillines in the supergroup Chrysilloida.

== Description ==
Habrocestum socotrense is a small spider with distinctive characteristics. Its body is divided into two main parts: a forward section, known as its cephalothorax, and, behind that, an oval abdomen. The female has an oval carapace, the hard upper part of the cephalothorax, that is typically 3.6 mm (0.14 in) long, 2.8 mm (0.11 in) wide and 1.6 mm (0.06 in) high. It is dark brown and has a dense covering of brown and grey hairs. Its eye field is darker and there are long brown bristles near the spider's eyes. The underside of the cephalothorax, or sternum, is brown as is the spider's face, or clypeus and its main mouthparts, its labium and maxillae. Its chelicerae have a curved fang with two teeth to the front and a single bicuspid teeth to the rear.

The male spider's narrow abdomen measures typically 2.8 mm (0.11 in) in length and between 1.9 mm (0.07 in) in width. It is generally brown on top and has a pattern of a stripe across the middle made of white hairs and two yellow patches at the back. Underneath, it is yellow and marked with a wide brown stripe. It has dark brown spinnerets, used for spinning webs. Its legs are generally orangish-brown with dark rings, brown and grey leg hairs and numerous brown spines.

The spider has distinctive copulatory organs. The male has hairy pedipalps that ends with a very short wide spike, or tibial apophysis, on its palpal tibia. At the end of this ia a rounded hairy cymbium, to which is attached a smaller elongated palpal bulb that has an anvil-like bulge on its bottom and a short embolus that projects from the top. The very small size of its tibial apophysis is the clearest way to tell the spider apart from others in the species. The female has not been described, although Wesołowska and van Harten noted that there were examples of female spiders that were found living nearby that were allocated to their own species that may be members of this one.

== Distribution ==
Habrocestum spiders have been found across Africa, Asia and Europe. Habrocestum socotrense is endemic to Yemen. The species is only found on the island of Socotra.
