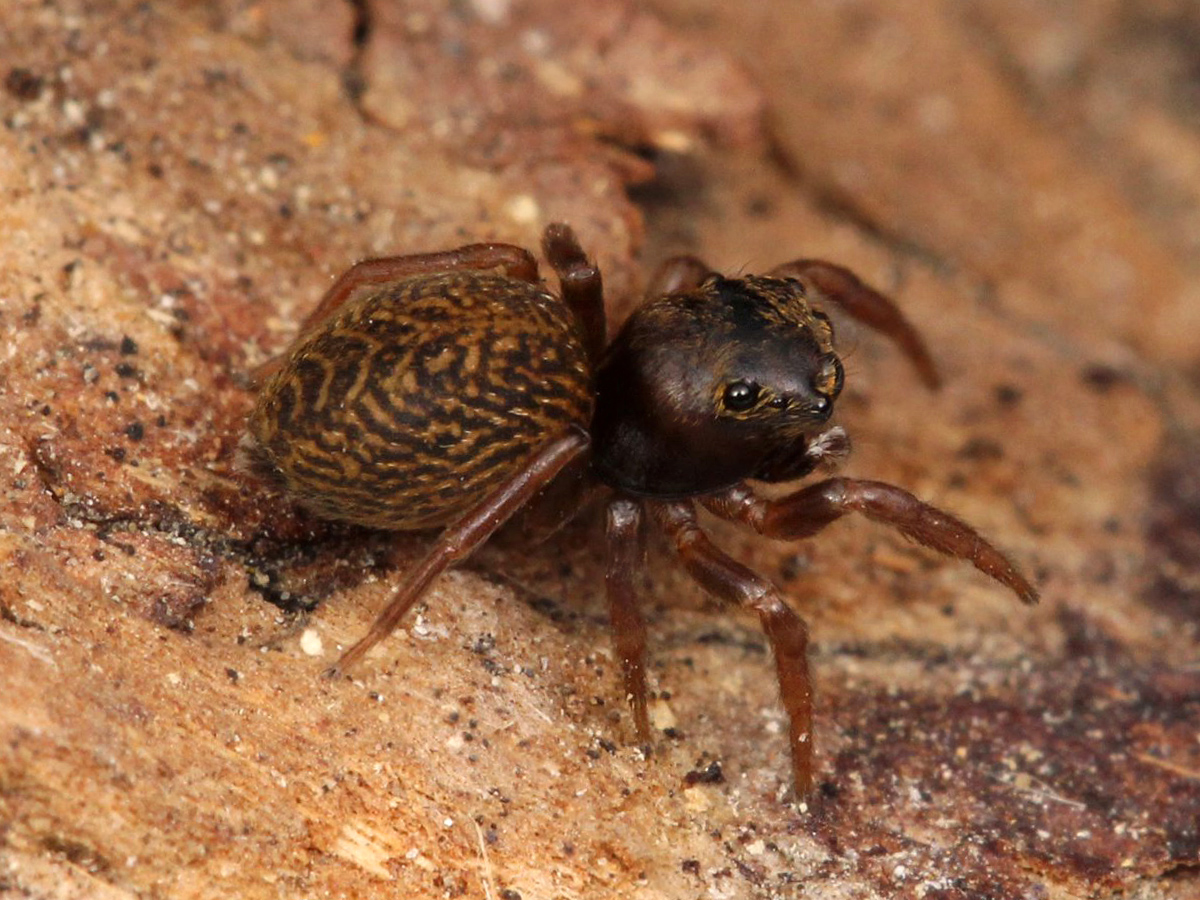
- Female

Conservation status
- Secure (NatureServe)

Scientific classification
- Kingdom: Animalia
- Phylum: Arthropoda
- Subphylum: Chelicerata
- Class: Arachnida
- Order: Araneae
- Infraorder: Araneomorphae
- Family: Salticidae
- Genus: Chinattus
- Species: C. parvulus

Binomial name
- Chinattus parvulus (Banks, 1895)

= Chinattus parvulus =

Species of spider

Chinattus parvulus is a species of jumping spider in the family Salticidae. It is found in the United States and Canada.
