= Habrocestum auricomum =

Medikwe Habrocestum Jumping Spider

Scientific classification
- Kingdom: Animalia
- Phylum: Arthropoda
- Subphylum: Chelicerata
- Class: Arachnida
- Order: Araneae
- Infraorder: Araneomorphae
- Family: Salticidae
- Genus: Habrocestum
- Species: H. auricomum

Binomial name
- Habrocestum auricomum Haddad & Wesołowska, 2013

Species of spider

Habrocestum auricomum is a species of spider in the family Salticidae. It is endemic to South Africa and is commonly known as Medikwe Habrocestum jumping spider.

== Distribution ==
Habrocestum auricomum is found in South Africa, where it is presently only known from three proximate localities south of the Soutpansberg Mountains in Limpopo, namely Goro Game Ranch near Vivo, Lhuvhondo Nature Reserve, and Medikwe Mountain Reserve.

== Habitat and ecology ==
Habrocestum auricomum inhabits the Savanna biome at altitudes ranging from 807 to 1341 m.

Free-living ground-dweller sampled from leaf litter and pitfall traps.

== Conservation ==
Habrocestum auricomum is listed as Data Deficient by the South African National Biodiversity Institute due to the small geographical range and the unknown female. There are no known threats and it is protected in the Lhuvhondo Nature Reserve and Medikwe Mountain Reserve in the Soutpansberg. However, the status of the species remains obscure and some more sampling is needed to collect the female and more accurately determine its range.

== Taxonomy ==
Habrocestum auricomum was described by Haddad and Wesołowska in 2013 from Medikwe Mountain Reserve and is known only from the male.
