= Socotroonops =

Scientific classification
- Kingdom: Animalia
- Phylum: Arthropoda
- Subphylum: Chelicerata
- Class: Arachnida
- Order: Araneae
- Infraorder: Araneomorphae
- Family: Oonopidae
- Genus: Socotroonops
- Species: S. socotra

Binomial name
- Socotroonops socotra Saaristo & van Harten, 2002

Genus of spiders

Socotroonops is a genus of spiders in the family Oonopidae. It was first described in 2002 by Saaristo & van Harten. As of 2017, it contains only one species, Socotroonops socotra.
