= Agelenella =

Scientific classification
- Kingdom: Animalia
- Phylum: Arthropoda
- Subphylum: Chelicerata
- Class: Arachnida
- Order: Araneae
- Infraorder: Araneomorphae
- Family: Agelenidae
- Genus: Agelenella
- Species: A. pusilla

Binomial name
- Agelenella pusilla Lehtinen, 1967

Genus of spiders

Agelenella is a genus of Asian funnel weavers containing the single species, Agelenella pusilla. It was first described by Pekka T. Lehtinen in 1967, and has only been found in Yemen.

== Description ==
It is about 6 millimetres (0.24 in) long and can be distinguished by the distinctly ringed legs. The pedipalps and the outer membrane of the carapace are yellowish orange with black marks. The legs are black with distinctive yellow rings. The tarsi and coxae are almost completely yellow. The underside is mostly black, though two lines run from the genital fold down the body. The legs and abdomen have sparse white hairs.

== Taxonomy ==
Very few specimens have been recorded, and of the few found, all of them were females. Though Agelenella is thought to be a monophyletic group of ten other Agelenidae genera, it is difficult to determine its relationship to those genera without a male specimen.
