= Habrocestum tanzanicum =

Tanzania Habrocestum Jumping Spider

Scientific classification
- Kingdom: Animalia
- Phylum: Arthropoda
- Subphylum: Chelicerata
- Class: Arachnida
- Order: Araneae
- Infraorder: Araneomorphae
- Family: Salticidae
- Genus: Habrocestum
- Species: H. tanzanicum

Binomial name
- Habrocestum tanzanicum Wesołowska & Russell-Smith, 2000

Species of spider

Habrocestum tanzanicum is a species of spider in the family Salticidae. It is found in Africa and is commonly known as Tanzania Habrocestum jumping spider.

== Distribution ==
Habrocestum tanzanicum is found in South Africa and Tanzania.

In South Africa, it has been sampled from Zeerust in the North West Province.

== Habitat and ecology ==
Habrocestum tanzanicum is a free-living ground-dweller that inhabits the Savanna biome at an altitude of 1246 m.

== Conservation ==
Habrocestum tanzanicum is listed as Least Concern by the South African National Biodiversity Institute due to its wide geographical range in Africa. There are no known threats.

== Taxonomy ==
Habrocestum tanzanicum was described in 2000 from Tanzania. It was later also recorded from South Africa.
