= Habrocestum mozambicum =

Scientific classification
- Kingdom: Animalia
- Phylum: Arthropoda
- Subphylum: Chelicerata
- Class: Arachnida
- Order: Araneae
- Infraorder: Araneomorphae
- Family: Salticidae
- Genus: Habrocestum
- Species: H. mozambicum

Binomial name
- Habrocestum mozambicum Haddad, Wiśniewski & Wesołowska, 2024

Species of spider

Habrocestum mozambicum is a species of jumping spider that lives in Mozambique.
