= Dimizonops =

Scientific classification
- Kingdom: Animalia
- Phylum: Arthropoda
- Subphylum: Chelicerata
- Class: Arachnida
- Order: Araneae
- Infraorder: Araneomorphae
- Family: Thomisidae
- Genus: Dimizonops; Pocock, 1903
- Species: D. insularis

Binomial name
- Dimizonops insularis Pocock, 1903

Monotypic genus of spiders

Dimizonops is a monotypic genus of Asian crab spiders containing the single species, Dimizonops insularis. It was first described by Reginald Innes Pocock in 1903, and is found on Socotra.

== See also ==
- List of Thomisidae species
