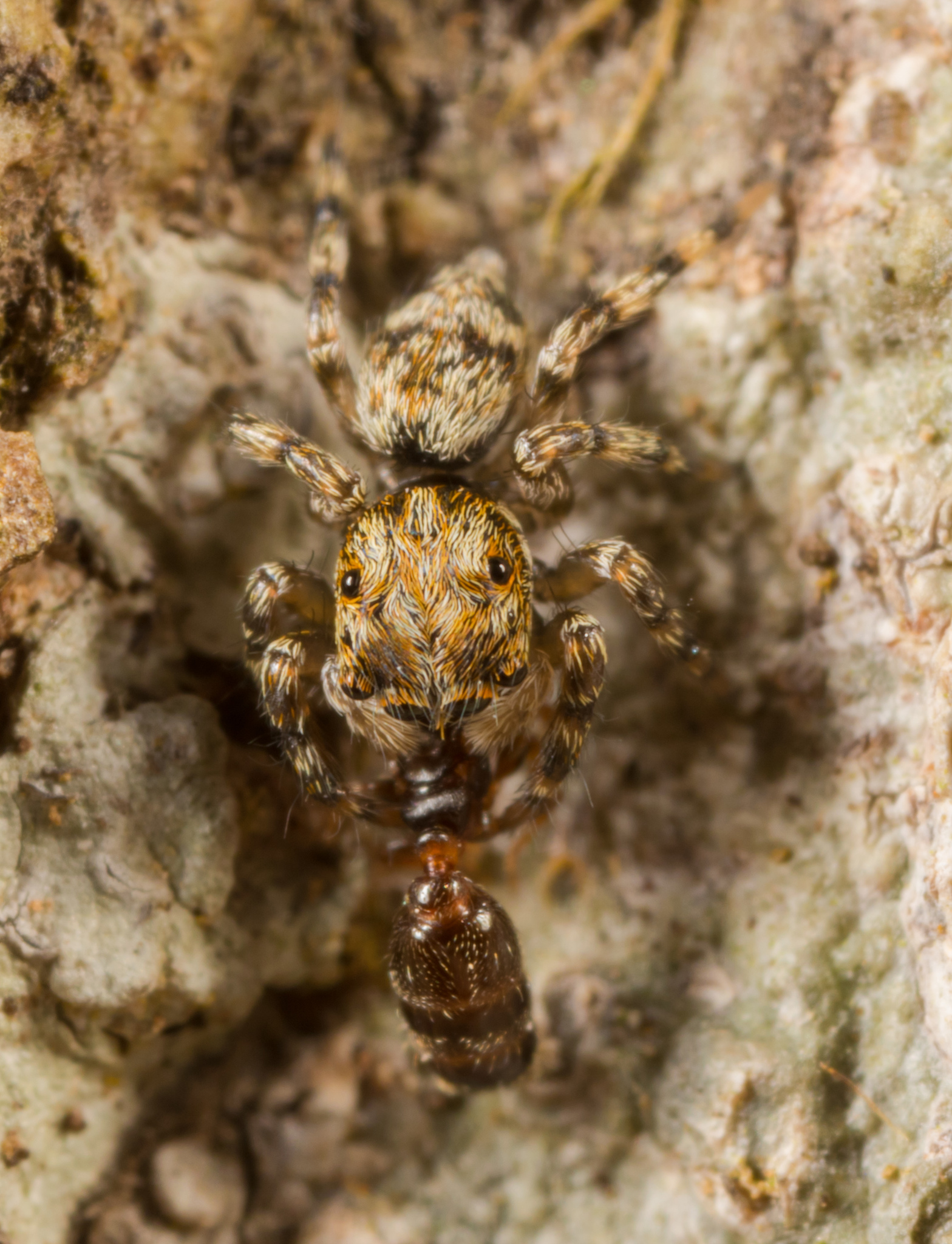
- H. hongkongiense, eating an ant
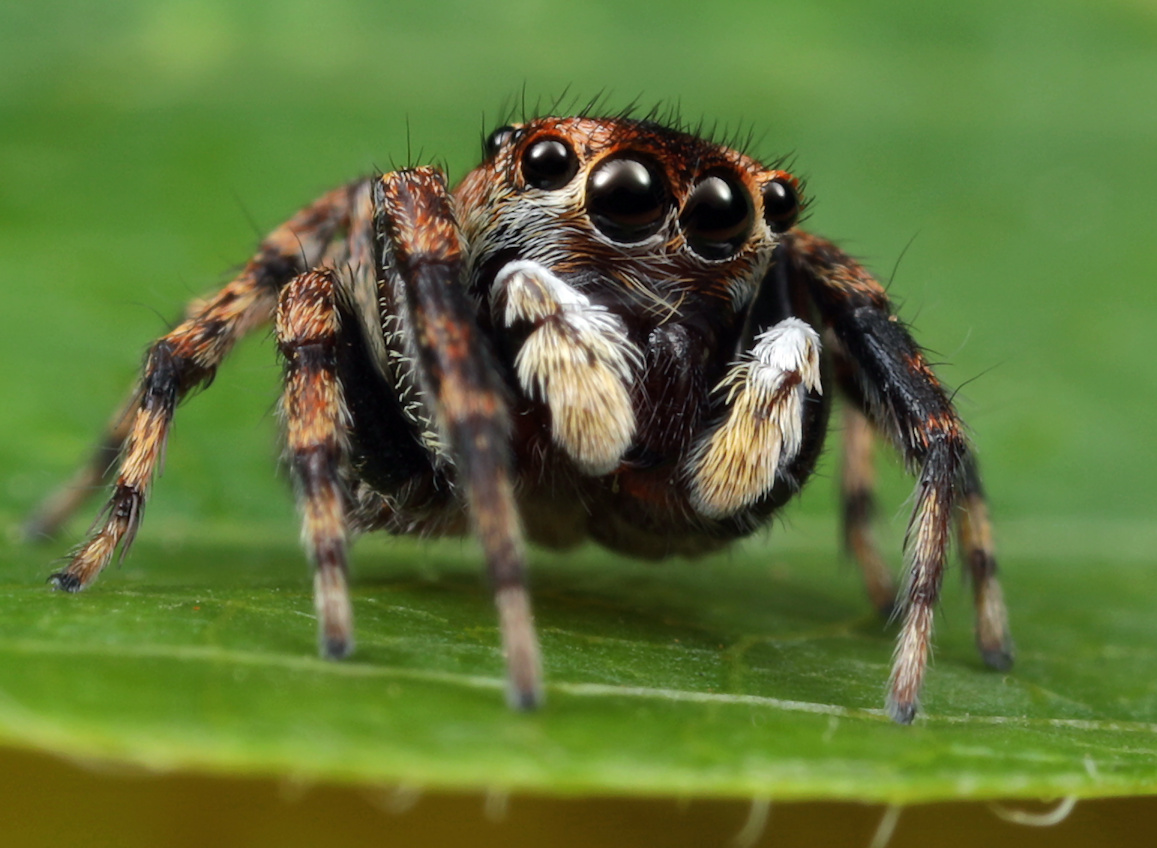
- male H. africanum from South Africa

Scientific classification
- Kingdom: Animalia
- Phylum: Arthropoda
- Subphylum: Chelicerata
- Class: Arachnida
- Order: Araneae
- Infraorder: Araneomorphae
- Family: Salticidae
- Subfamily: Salticinae
- Genus: Habrocestum; Simon, 1876

Type species
- Habrocestum pullatum Simon, 1876

Species
- See text.

Diversity
- 59 species

= Habrocestum =

Genus of spiders

Habrocestum is a genus of jumping spiders first described in 1876. They mostly occur in Eurasia and Africa, though one species has been found in Australia and another on the Solomon Islands.

== Species ==
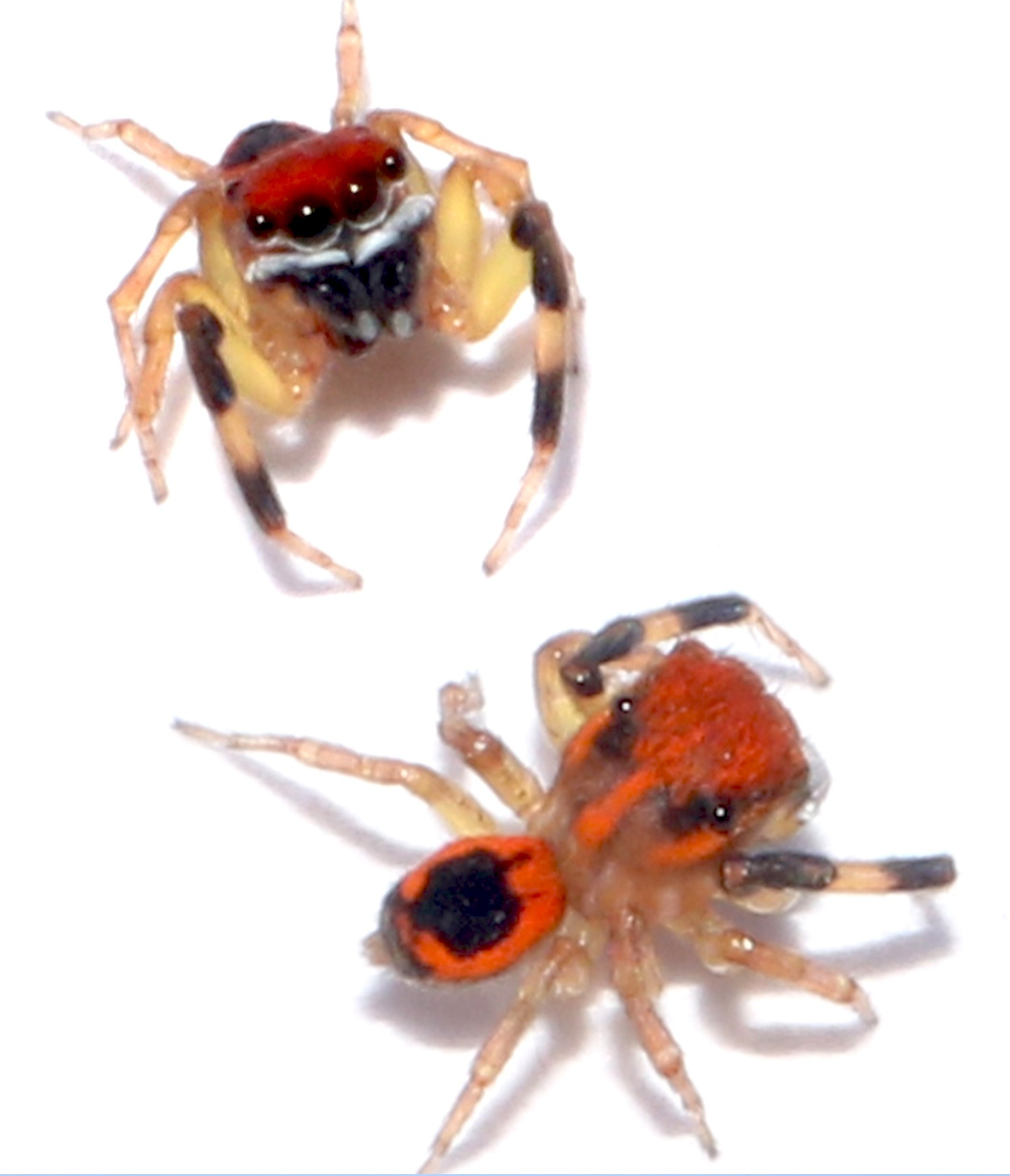
H. togansangmai

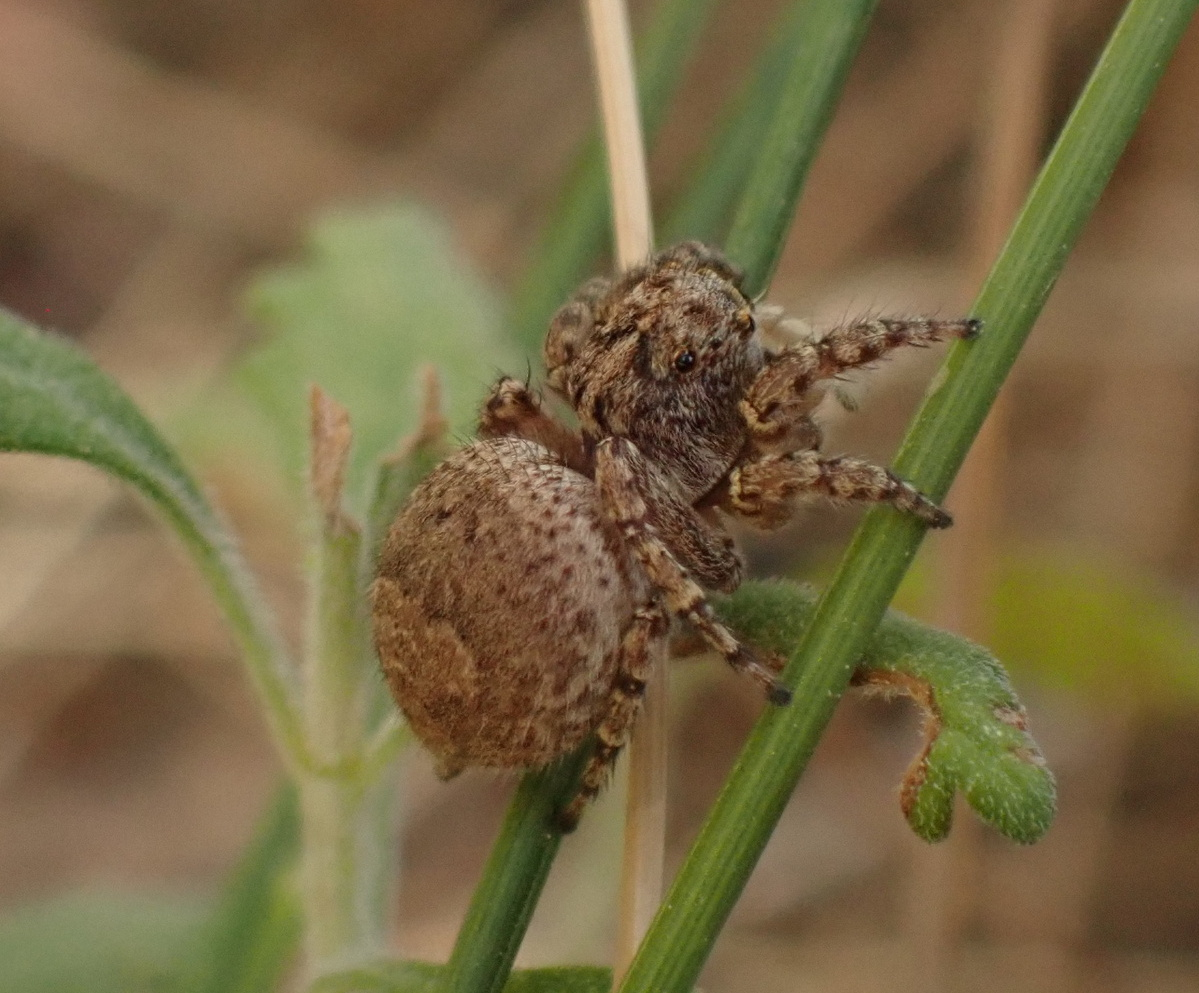
female H. latifasciatum

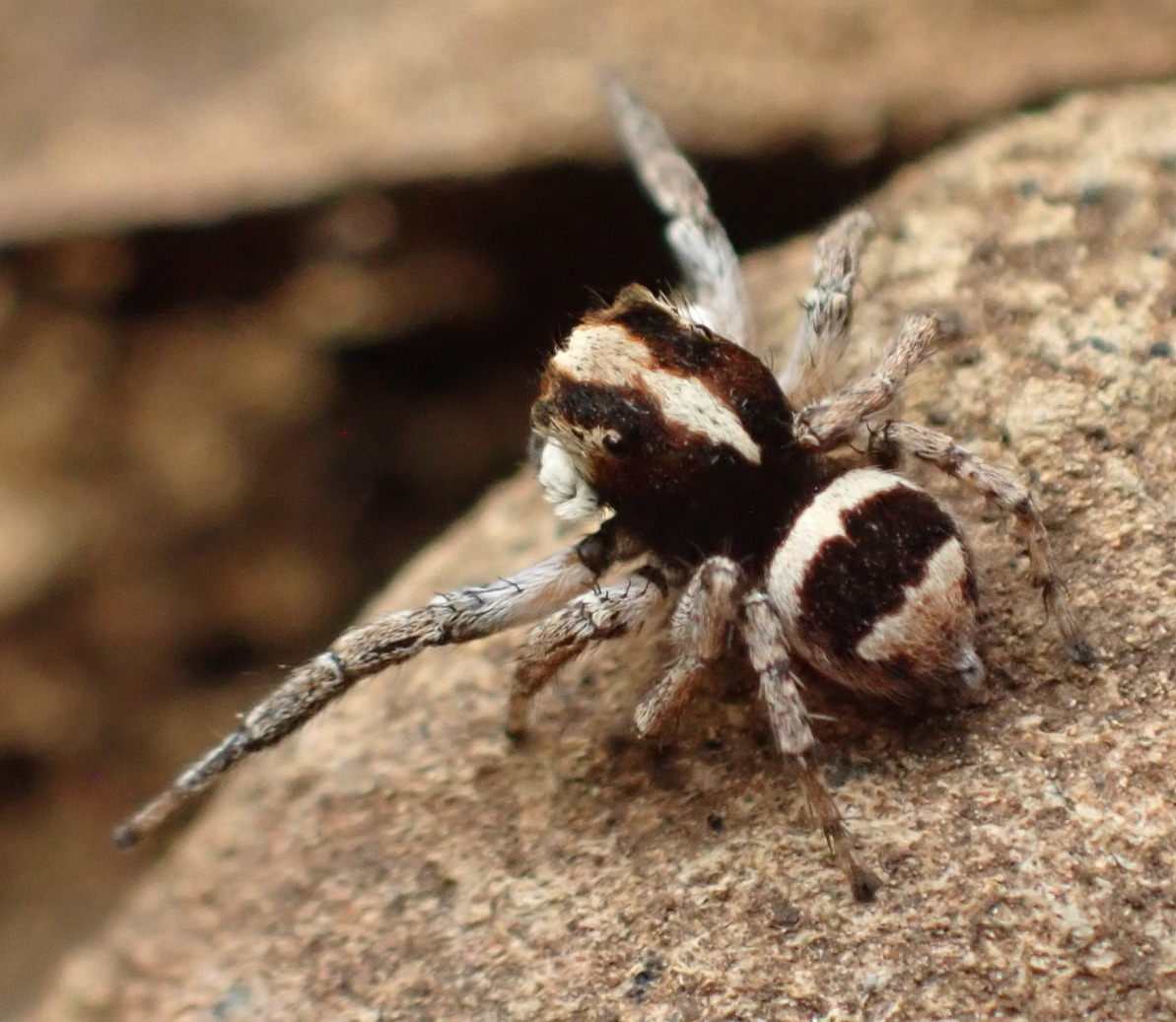
male H. latifasciatum

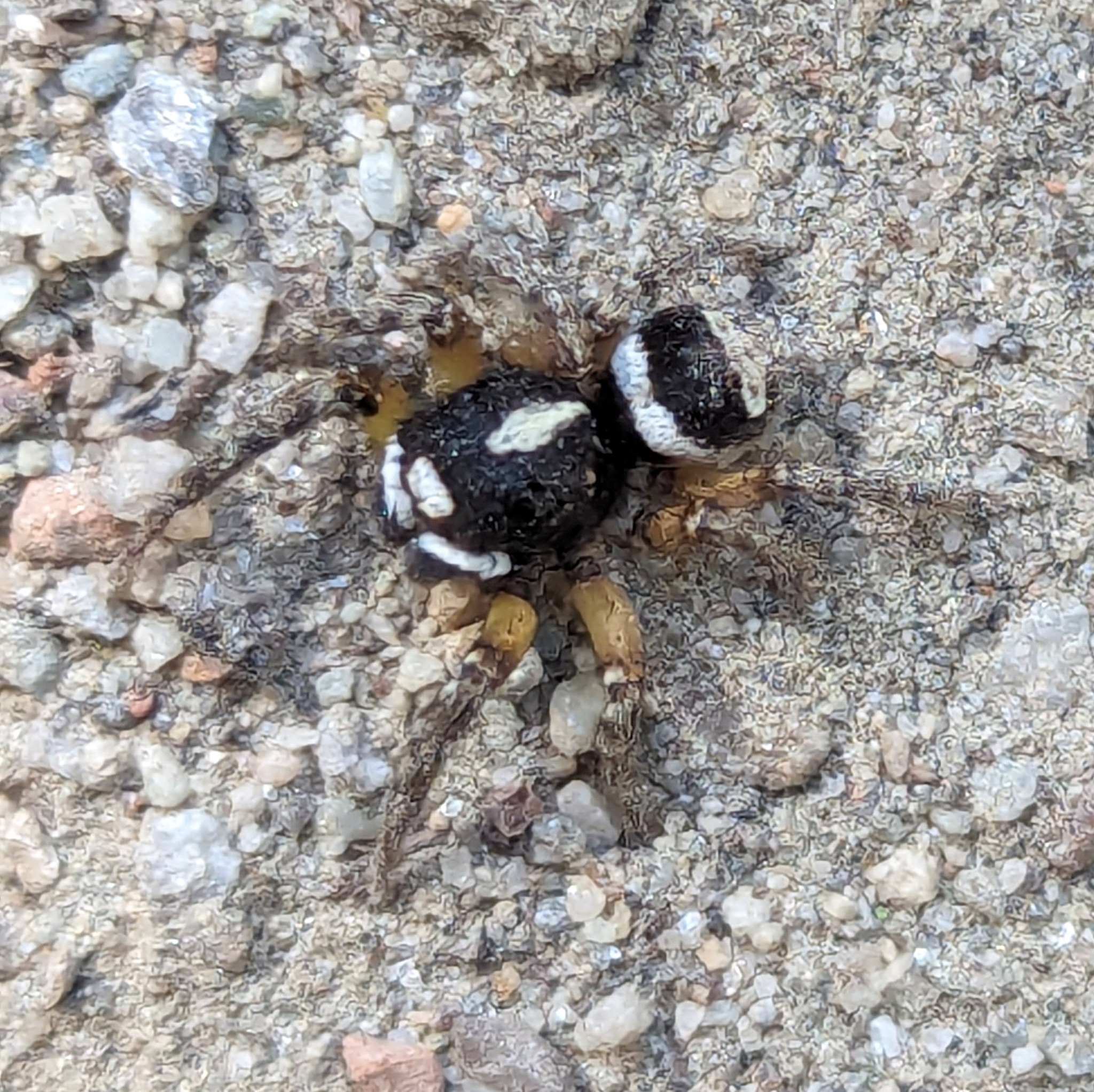
male H. papilionaceum

As of July 2026, this genus includes 59 species:

- Habrocestum africanum Wesołowska & Haddad, 2009 – South Africa
- Habrocestum albimanum Simon, 1901 – South Africa
- Habrocestum albopunctatum Wesołowska & van Harten, 2002 – Yemen (Socotra)
- Habrocestum algericum Dalmas, 1920 – Algeria, Pakistan?
- Habrocestum arabicum Prószyński, 1989 – Saudi Arabia
- Habrocestum auricomum Haddad & Wesołowska, 2013 – South Africa
- Habrocestum benjamin Jose, Caleb & Sudhikumar, 2024 – India
- Habrocestum bovaei (Lucas, 1846) – Morocco, Algeria, Spain
- Habrocestum dubium Wesołowska & van Harten, 2002 – Yemen (Socotra)
- Habrocestum egaeum Metzner, 1999 – Greece (Islands, Crete), Turkey
- Habrocestum ferrugineum Wesołowska & van Harten, 2002 – Yemen (Socotra)
- Habrocestum flavimanum Simon, 1901 – South Africa
- Habrocestum formosum Wesołowska, 2000 – Zimbabwe
- Habrocestum gibbosum Wesołowska & van Harten, 2007 – Yemen
- Habrocestum graecum Dalmas, 1920 – Italy, Greece
- Habrocestum hantaneensis Kanesharatnam & Benjamin, 2016 – Sri Lanka
- Habrocestum hongkongiense Prószyński, 1992 – China
- Habrocestum ibericum Dalmas, 1920 – Spain
- Habrocestum ignorabile Wesołowska & van Harten, 2007 – Yemen
- Habrocestum imilchang Kadam & Tripathi, 2023 – India
- Habrocestum inquinatum Wesołowska & van Harten, 2002 – Yemen (mainland, Socotra)
- Habrocestum kerala Asima, Caleb, Babu & Prasad, 2022 – India
- Habrocestum kodigalaensis Kanesharatnam & Benjamin, 2016 – Sri Lanka
- Habrocestum latifasciatum (Simon, 1868) – Italy, Greece, Turkey, Libya
- Habrocestum laurae G. W. Peckham & E. G. Peckham, 1903 – South Africa
- Habrocestum lepidum Dalmas, 1920 – Algeria
- Habrocestum liptoni Kanesharatnam & Benjamin, 2020 – Sri Lanka
- Habrocestum longispinum Sankaran, Malamel, Joseph & Sebastian, 2019 – India
- Habrocestum luculentum G. W. Peckham & E. G. Peckham, 1903 – South Africa
- Habrocestum mboki Wesołowska, Russell-Smith & Danflous, 2026 – Central African Republic
- Habrocestum mookambikaense Sudhin, Sen, Caleb & Hegde, 2022 – India
- Habrocestum mozambicum Haddad, Wiśniewski & Wesołowska, 2024 – Mozambique
- Habrocestum nahalit Szűts & Gavish-Regev, 2024 – Turkey, Syria, Lebanon, Israel
- Habrocestum naivasha Dawidowicz & Wesołowska, 2016 – Uganda, Kenya
- Habrocestum namibicum Wesołowska, 2006 – Namibia
- Habrocestum nigristernum Dalmas, 1920 – Turkey
- Habrocestum ohiyaensis Kanesharatnam & Benjamin, 2016 – Sri Lanka
- Habrocestum ornaticeps (Simon, 1868) – Morocco, Spain
- Habrocestum papilionaceum (L. Koch, 1867) – Greece, Turkey
- Habrocestum peckhami Rainbow, 1899 – Solomon Islands
- Habrocestum penicillatum Caporiacco, 1940 – Ethiopia
- Habrocestum personatum Wesołowska & Russell-Smith, 2011 – Nigeria
- Habrocestum pullatum Simon, 1876 – France (type species)
- Habrocestum punctiventre Keyserling, 1882 – Australia (Western Australia)
- Habrocestum sahyadri Asima, Caleb & Prasad, 2024 – India
- Habrocestum sapiens (G. W. Peckham & E. G. Peckham, 1903) – Zimbabwe, South Africa
- Habrocestum schinzi Simon, 1887 – South Africa
- Habrocestum shendurneyense Asima, Caleb, Babu & Prasad, 2022 – India
- Habrocestum shulovi Prószyński, 2000 – Turkey, Israel
- Habrocestum simoni Dalmas, 1920 – Algeria
- Habrocestum socotrense Wesołowska & van Harten, 2002 – Yemen (Socotra)
- Habrocestum speciosum Wesołowska & van Harten, 1994 – Yemen (Socotra)
- Habrocestum subdotatum Caporiacco, 1940 – Ethiopia, East Africa
- Habrocestum subpenicillatum Caporiacco, 1941 – Ethiopia
- Habrocestum superbum Wesołowska, 2000 – Zimbabwe, South Africa
- Habrocestum swaminathan Jose, Caleb & Sudhikumar, 2024 – India
- Habrocestum tanzanicum Wesołowska & Russell-Smith, 2000 – Tanzania, South Africa
- Habrocestum togansangmai Kadam & Tripathi, 2023 – India
- Habrocestum verattii Caporiacco, 1936 – Libya
- Habrocestum virginale Wesołowska & van Harten, 2007 – Yemen
