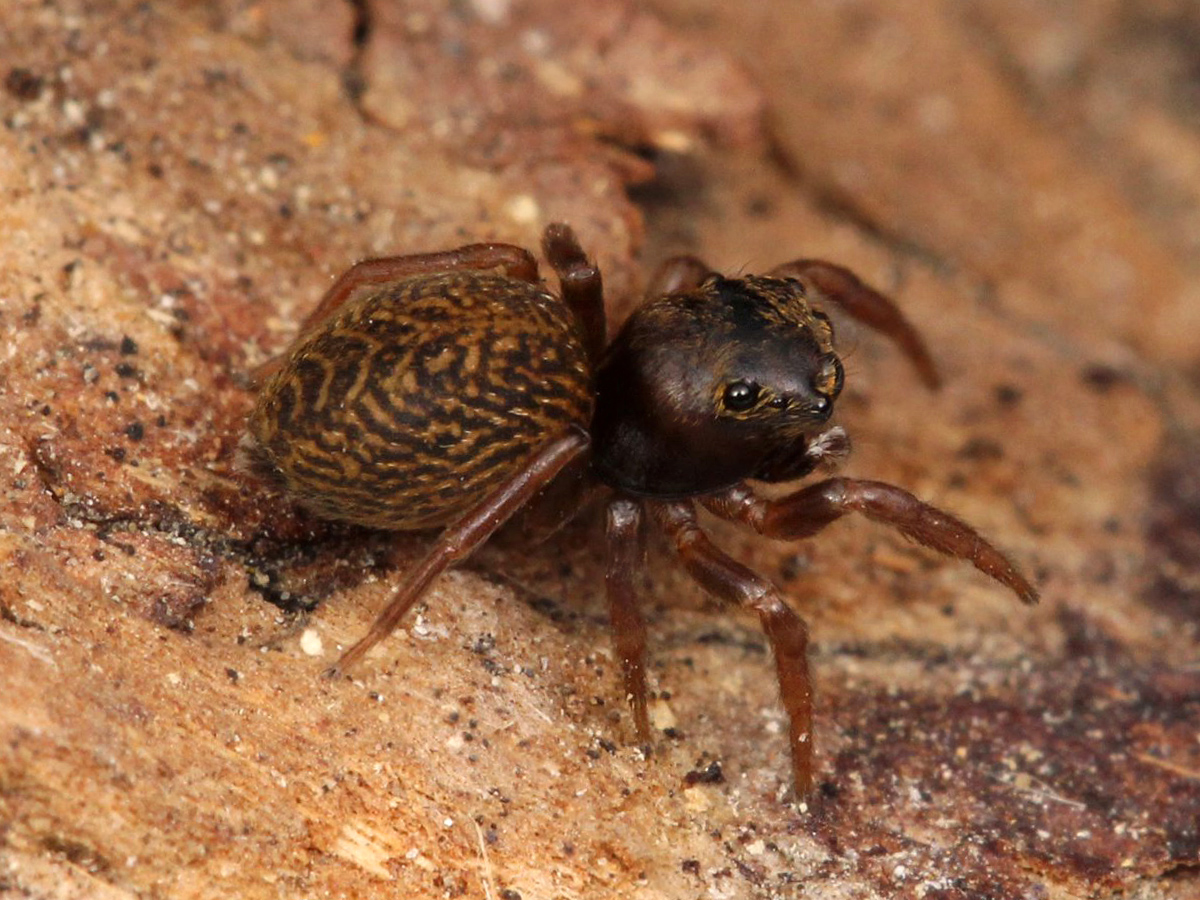
- Female Chinattus parvulus
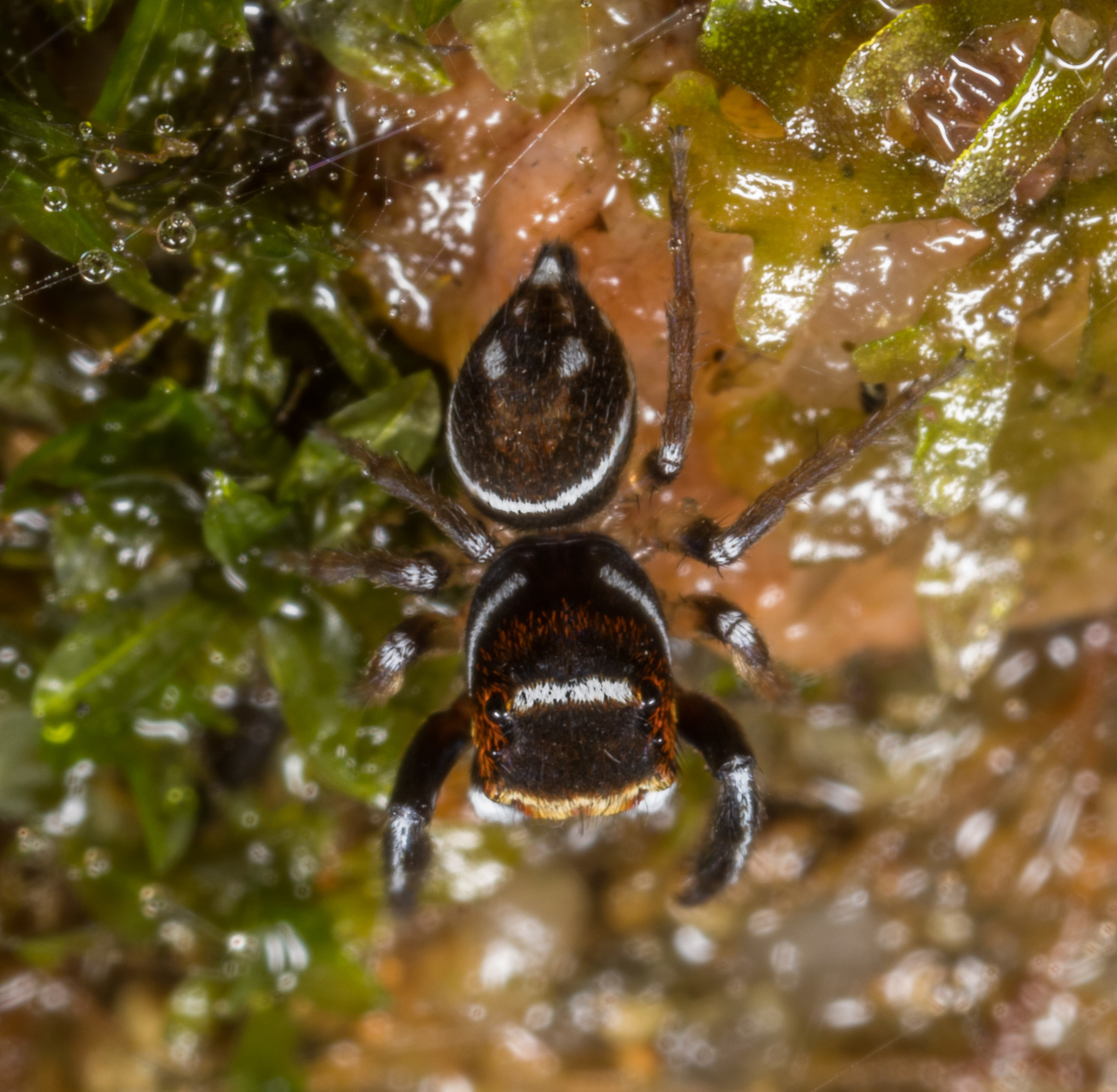
- male Chinattus sinensis

Scientific classification
- Kingdom: Animalia
- Phylum: Arthropoda
- Subphylum: Chelicerata
- Class: Arachnida
- Order: Araneae
- Infraorder: Araneomorphae
- Family: Salticidae
- Subfamily: Salticinae
- Genus: Chinattus; Logunov, 1999

Type species
- C. undulatus (Song & Chai, 1992)

Species
- 17, see text

= Chinattus =

Genus of spiders

Chinattus is a genus of jumping spiders that was first described by D. V. Logunov in 1999. The name is a combination of "China" and -attus, a common suffix for salticid genera.

== Species ==
As of June 2019 it contains seventeen species, most occurring in China and nearby countries, with C. caucasicus reaching into Iran, and C. parvulus in North America:

- Chinattus caucasicus Logunov, 1999 – Caucasus, Iran
- Chinattus chichila Logunov, 2003 – Nepal
- Chinattus dactyloides (Xie, Peng & Kim, 1993) – China, Japan
- Chinattus emeiensis (Peng & Xie, 1995) – China
- Chinattus falco Suguro, 2016 – Japan
- Chinattus furcatus (Xie, Peng & Kim, 1993) – China, Japan
- Chinattus ogatai Suguro, 2014 – Japan
- Chinattus parvulus (Banks, 1895) – USA, Canada
- Chinattus sinensis (Prószyński, 1992) – China
- Chinattus szechwanensis (Prószyński, 1992) – China
- Chinattus taiwanensis Bao & Peng, 2002 – Taiwan
- Chinattus tibialis (Zabka, 1985) – China, Vietnam
- Chinattus undulatus (Song & Chai, 1992) (type) – China
- Chinattus validus (Xie, Peng & Kim, 1993) – China, Nepal, Bhutan
- Chinattus wengnanensis Cao & Li, 2016 – China
- Chinattus wulingensis (Peng & Xie, 1995) – China
- Chinattus wulingoides (Peng & Xie, 1995) – China
