= List of Sites of Special Scientific Interest in Dorset =

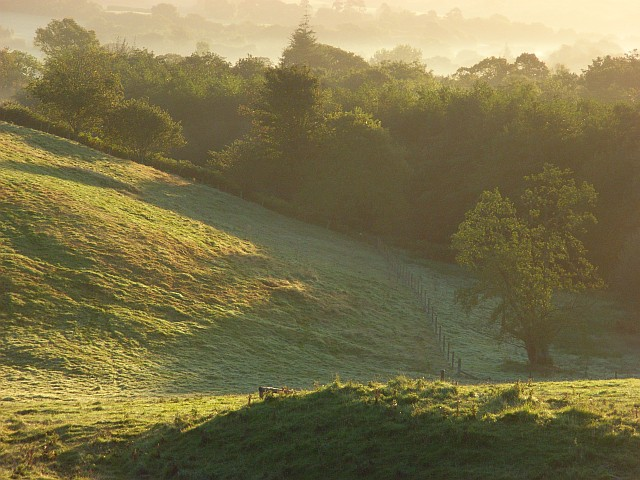
Woodland in Aunt Mary's Bottom SSSI, Dorset

This is a list of the Sites of Special Scientific Interest (SSSIs) in the county of Dorset, England, United Kingdom. In England the body responsible for designating SSSIs is Natural England, which chooses a site because of its fauna, flora, geological or physiographical features. Natural England uses Dorset's borders to mark one of its Areas of Search. As of 2012, there are 139 sites designated in this Area of Search. There are 20 sites with a purely geological interest, and 103 listed for biological interest. A further 16 sites are designated for both reasons.

Natural England took over the role of designating and managing SSSIs from English Nature in October 2006 when it was formed from the amalgamation of English Nature, parts of the Countryside Agency and the Rural Development Service. Natural England, like its predecessor, uses the 1974–1996 county system and as such the same approach is followed here. The data in the table is taken from Natural England in the form of citation sheets for each SSSI, and the County Background Datasheet for Dorset.

For other counties, see List of SSSIs by Area of Search.

== Sites ==
Site name	Reason for designation		Area^{[A]}		Coordinates & Grid ref^{[B]}	Year in which notified	Other designations	Map^{[C]} & Citation
Site name	Biological interest	Geological interest	Hectares	Acres	Coordinates & Grid ref^{[B]}	Year in which notified	Other designations	Map^{[C]} & Citation
Abbotsbury Blind Lane		✓	0.2	0.5	50.668°N 2.601°W; SY576855	1977	AONB, GCR, HC	Map
Abbotsbury Castle	✓		34.9	86.2	50.674°N 2.621°W; SY562862	1984	AONB, HC	Map
Arne	✓	✓	557.6	1,377.9	50.69°N 2.052°W; SY964878	1986	AONB, SPA, GCR, NNR, NCR, Ramsar site, SAC	Map
Alder Hills	✓	✓	5.2	13		1984		
Aunt Mary's Bottom	✓		8.2	20.3	50.818°N 2.646°W; ST546023	1991	AONB, SAC	Map
River Avon System	✓		475.9	1,176.1	51.026°N 1.76°W; SU169252	1996	NCR, SAC	Map
Avon Valley (Bickton To Christchurch)	✓		1,403.8	3,468.9	50.772°N 1.791°W; SZ148970	1993	SPA, ESA, WT, NCR, Ramsar site	Map
River Axe, Devon	✓	✓	69.5	171.8	50.78°N 3.007°W; SY291983	1999	AONB, GCR, SAC	Map
Babylon Hill		✓	1.1	2.7	50.936°N 2.603°W; ST577154	1986	GCR	Map
Batcombe Down	✓		18.5	45.7	50.833°N 2.541°W; ST620039	1977	AONB	Map
Belle Vue Quarry	✓		2.6	6.4	50.604°N 1.982°W; SZ014782	1952	AONB, NT	Map
Bere Stream	✓		10.9	27.0	50.729°N 2.203°W; SY858922	1977		Map
Black Hill Down	✓		59.6	147.2	50.8°N 2.47°W; ST670002	1977	AONB, SAC	Map
Black Hill Heath	✓		70.5	174.3	50.745°N 2.232°W; SY837940	1989	SPA, Ramsar site, SAC	Map
Blackdown (Hardy Monument)		✓	21.8	54.0	50.685°N 2.551°W; SY612874	1989	AONB, GCR, NT	Map
Blackmore Vale Commons and Moors	✓		299.3	739.7	50.901°N 2.355°W; ST751113	2012	Common land, SAC	Map
Blandford Camp	✓		28.7	70.9	50.876°N 2.108°W; ST925085	1994	AONB	Map
Blashenwell Farm Pit		✓	11.3	28.0	50.624°N 2.069°W; SY952805	1954	AONB, GCR	Map
Blue Pool And Norden Heaths	✓		112.5	278.0	50.648°N 2.088°W; SY939831	1985	AONB, SPA, Ramsar site, SAC	Map
Boulsbury Wood	✓		119.8	295.9	50.935°N 1.896°W; SU074151	1983		Map
Bourne Valley	✓		72.8	180.0	50.734°N 1.906°W; SZ067927	1995	SAM, SPA, LNR, WT, Ramsar site, SAC	Map
Bracket's Coppice And Ryewater Farm	✓		53.8	132.8	50.862°N 2.688°W; ST517072	1984	AONB, SAC	Map
Bradford Abbas Railway Cutting		✓	1.4	3.4	50.928°N 2.583°W; ST591144	1990	GCR	Map
Breach Fields	✓		11.4	28.2	50.999°N 2.211°W; ST853222	1991		Map
Brenscombe Heath	✓		34.8	85.9	50.649°N 2.025°W; SY983833	1985	AONB, HC, Ramsar site, SAC	Map
Bryanston	✓		0.3	0.7	50.861°N 2.18°W; ST874069	1977	AONB	Map
Bugden's Copse And Meadows	✓		7.6	18.7	50.879°N 1.875°W; SU089088	1990	LNR	Map
Burton Bradstock		✓	0.1	0.2	50.7°N 2.728°W; SY487892	1986	AONB, GCR, HC	Map
Canford Heath	✓		413.1	1,020.7	50.763°N 1.962°W; SZ028959	1985	SAM, SPA, NCR, Ramsar site, SAC	Map
Chalbury Hill And Quarry		✓	12.0	29.6	50.653°N 2.434°W; SY694838	1984	AONB, GCR	Map
Chesil & The Fleet	✓	✓	983.1	2,429.4	50.625°N 2.554°W; SY609807	1986	AONB, GCR, NCR, Ramsar site, SAC	Map
Christchurch Harbour	✓	✓	352.1	870.2	50.721°N 1.758°W; SZ172913	1986	SAM, GCR, LNR, SAC	Map
Conegar Road Cutting	✓		0.2	0.4	50.822°N 2.798°W; ST439028	1996	AONB	Map
Corfe & Barrow Hills	✓		101.6	251.1	50.773°N 2.003°W; SY999970	1986	SPA, Ramsar site, SAC	Map
Corfe Common	✓		91.0	224.8	50.629°N 2.062°W; SY957810	1984	AONB, NT, Ramsar site, SAC	Map
Corfe Meadows	✓		18.1	44.8	50.653°N 2.054°W; SY963837	1987	AONB, HC	Map
Corfe Mullen Pastures	✓		11.9	29.4	50.766°N 2.037°W; SY975963	1994	Ramsar site, SAC	Map
Corton Cutting		✓	0.2	0.6	50.667°N 2.516°W; SY636854	1997	AONB, GCR	Map
Court Farm, Sydling	✓		83.2	205.5	50.795°N 2.545°W; SY617996	1987	AONB, SAC	Map
Cranborne Common	✓		133.3	329.4	50.892°N 1.862°W; SU098103	1985	AONB, SPA, WT, Ramsar site, SAC	Map
Creech Grange	✓		<0.1	0.1	50.639°N 2.127°W; SY911822	1986	AONB, NCR	Map
Crookhill Brick Pit		✓	4.7	11.6	50.618°N 2.505°W; SY644799	2003	GCR, HC	Map
Cull-peppers Dish		✓	0.8	2.1	50.732°N 2.265°W; SY814925	1989	GCR	Map
Drakenorth	✓		26.2	64.8	50.778°N 2.674°W; SY526978	1986	AONB	Map
East Coppice	✓		4.7	11.7	50.746°N 2.15°W; SY895941	1987		Map
Ebblake Bog	✓		11.4	28.2	50.862°N 1.852°W; SU105069	1985	SPA, Ramsar site, SAC	Map
Eggardon Hill & Luccas Farm	✓		144.4	356.7	50.753°N 2.655°W; SY539950	1986	AONB, NT, NCR	Map
Ferndown Common	✓		64.4	159.1	50.799°N 1.905°W; SZ068999	1984	SPA, SAC	Map
Fontmell And Melbury Downs	✓		263.1	650.1	50.961°N 2.165°W; ST885180	1987	AONB, NT, SAC	Map
Frogden Quarry		✓	0.2	0.5	50.963°N 2.503°W; ST648183	1986	GCR	Map
River Frome	✓		151.5	374.2	50.699°N 2.266°W; SY813888	1998	SAM, AONB, WT, Ramsar site	Map
Frome St Quintin	✓		32.7	80.7	50.833°N 2.598°W; ST580039	1991	AONB, SAC	Map
Giant Hill	✓		84.1	207.8	50.817°N 2.473°W; ST668020	1985	AONB, NT, SAC	Map
Goathill Quarry		✓	0.3	0.7	50.956°N 2.471°W; ST670175	1986	GCR	Map
Halfway House Quarry		✓	0.9	2.1	50.945°N 2.568°W; ST602163	1986	GCR	Map
Ham Common	✓	✓	32.9	81.4	50.716°N 2.03°W; SY980907	1987	SPA, GCR, LNR, MOD, Ramsar site, SAC	Map
Handcocks Bottom	✓		54.4	134.5	50.918°N 2.142°W; ST901132	1988	AONB	Map
Hartland Moor	✓		301.3	744.5	50.666°N 2.071°W; SY951851	1986	AONB, SPA, NNR, NT, NCR, Ramsar site, SAC	Map
Haydon And Askerswell Downs	✓		107.4	265.4	50.74°N 2.645°W; SY546936	1985	AONB, NCR	Map
Highcliffe To Milford Cliffs		✓	110.1	272.1	50.731°N 1.639°W; SZ256924	1991	GCR	Map
Higher Houghton	✓		145.0	358.4	50.843°N 2.285°W; ST800049	1984	SAM, AONB, ESA, NCR	Map
Hod And Hambledon Hills	✓		101.4	250.5	50.913°N 2.223°W; ST844126	1986	AONB, NNR, NT, NCR	Map
Hog Cliff	✓		85.4	211.1	50.77°N 2.547°W; SY615969	1985	AONB, NNR, SAC	Map
Holnest	✓		54.9	135.8	50.894°N 2.475°W; ST667106	2004	SAC	Map
Holt And West Moors Heaths	✓		767.0	1,895.2	50.841°N 1.937°W; SU045046	1988	SPA, MOD, NCR, Ramsar site, SAC	Map
Holton And Sandford Heaths	✓		277.2	684.9	50.722°N 2.069°W; SY952914	1997	SPA, NNR, Ramsar site, SAC,	Map
Holway Hill Quarry	✓		0.1	0.3	50.988°N 2.517°W; ST638211	1998		Map
Horn Park Quarry	✓	✓	2.7	6.6	50.816°N 2.772°W; ST457021	1986	AONB, GCR, NNR	Map
Horton Common	✓		20.1	49.5	50.863°N 1.895°W; SU075071	1984	SPA, Ramsar site, SAC	Map
Hurn Common	✓		83.4	206.1	50.79°N 1.842°W; SZ112990	1986	CP, SPA, WT, MOD, SAC,	Map
Lambert's Castle	✓		109.2	269.9	50.776°N 2.896°W; SY369978	1989	AONB	Map
Langford Meadow	✓		7.8	19.2	50.755°N 2.516°W; SY637952	1985	AONB	Map
Lions Hill	✓		43.4	107.2	50.833°N 1.854°W; SU104037	1985	SPA, Ramsar site, SAC	Map
Lodmoor	✓		74.9	185.1	50.632°N 2.444°W; SY687815	1985	RSPB	Map
Lorton	✓		21.3	52.7	50.639°N 2.461°W; SY675823	1987		Map
Low's Hill Quarry		✓	0.8	1.9	50.943°N 2.556°W; ST610161	1989	GCR	Map
Lulworth Park & Lake	✓		46.9	115.8	50.643°N 2.206°W; SY855826	1988	AONB	Map
Luscombe Valley	✓		58.0	143.2	50.704°N 1.932°W; SZ049894	1996	LNR	Map
Lyscombe And Highdon	✓		82.9	204.9	50.812°N 2.377°W; ST735014	1986	SAM, AONB, ESA	Map
Mapperton And Poorton Vales	✓		85.2	210.6	50.794°N 2.692°W; SY513996	1992	AONB, SAC	Map
Martin And Tidpit Downs	✓		367.5	908.2	50.967°N 1.926°W; SU053186	1987	SAM, AONB, NNR, NCR	Map
Melbury Park	✓		259.4	640.9	50.849°N 2.606°W; ST574057	1985	AONB, NCR	Map
The Moors	✓		157.9	390.1	50.684°N 2.074°W; SY949871	1985	AONB, SPA, HC, Ramsar site, SAC	Map
Moors River System	✓		291.9	721.3	50.795°N 1.844°W; SZ111995	1999	AONB, CP, WT, NCR	Map
Morcombelake	✓		23.0	56.7	50.745°N 2.845°W; SY405943	1991	AONB, HC	Map
Morden Bog And Hyde Heath	✓		659.9	1,630.6	50.727°N 2.188°W; SY868920	1996	SAM, SPA, NNR, NCR, Ramsar site, SAC	Map
Nicodemus Heights	✓		7.9	19.5	50.557°N 2.431°W; SY696731	1999	SAC	Map
Oakers Bog	✓	✓	29.8	73.7	50.726°N 2.266°W; SY813918	1988	SPA, GCR, Ramsar site, SAC	Map
Oakers Wood	✓		47.2	116.5	50.723°N 2.276°W; SY806915	1984		Map
Oakhills Coppice	✓		14.4	35.6	50.88°N 2.03°W; ST980089	1990	AONB	Map
Parley Common	✓		163.9	405.1	50.793°N 1.872°W; SZ091993	1984	SPA, NCR, Ramsar site, SAC,	Map
Peashill Quarry		✓	0.4	1.1	50.721°N 2.717°W; SY495915	1989	AONB, GCR	Map
Pentridge Down	✓		62.3	154.0	50.954°N 1.943°W; SU041172	1996	AONB	Map
Piddles Wood	✓		73.1	180.5	50.915°N 2.293°W; ST795129	1985	WT	Map
Pitcombe Down	✓		13.1	32.4	50.704°N 2.59°W; SY584895	1985	AONB	Map
Poole Bay Cliffs		✓	12.3	30.4	50.712°N 1.897°W; SZ074903	1989	GCR	Map
Poole Harbour	✓		2,268.9	5,606.6	50.72°N 2.041°W; SY972911	1990	AONB, SPA, NT, NCR, Ramsar site, SAC	Map
Isle of Portland	✓	✓	352.1	869.9	50.529°N 2.439°W; SY690700	1987	GCR, SAC	Map
Portland Harbour Shore	✓	✓	28.1	69.4	50.598°N 2.458°W; SY677777	1987	Crown estate, GCR, SAC	Map
Povington And Grange Heaths	✓		1,217.1	3,007.5	50.651°N 2.154°W; SY892835	1986	AONB, SPA, MOD, NCR, Ramsar site, SAC	Map
Powerstock Common And Wytherston Farm	✓		161.7	399.5	50.767°N 2.654°W; SY540966	1900	AONB, WT, SAC,	Map
Poxwell	✓		0.4	1.1	50.651°N 2.369°W; SY740835	1998	AONB	Map
Purbeck Ridge (East)	✓	✓	143.6	354.8	50.63°N 1.955°W; SZ033811	1999	AONB, GCR, HC, SAC	Map
Purbeck Ridge (West)	✓		144.7	357.5	50.633°N 2.158°W; SY889815	1986	AONB	Map
Purewell Meadows	✓		12.9	31.8	50.739°N 1.766°W; SZ166933	1985		Map
Radipole Lake	✓		96.0	237.1	50.623°N 2.468°W; SY670805	1985	RSPB	Map
Rempstone Heaths	✓		170.0	420.0	50.651°N 2.03°W; SY980835	1987	AONB, SPA, HC, Ramsar site, SAC	Map
Sandford Lane Quarry		✓	0.8	1.9	50.958°N 2.531°W; ST628177	1990	GCR	Map
Shillingstone Quarry	✓		8.2	20.3	50.887°N 2.253°W; ST823097	1995	AONB	Map
Slop Bog And Uddens Heath	✓		43.9	108.5	50.816°N 1.892°W; SU077018	1985	SPA, Ramsar site, SAC	Map
South Dorset Coast	✓	✓	1,591.7	3,933.1	50.623°N 2.187°W; SY869804	1986	AONB, CP, GCR, HC, WT, NT, NCR, SAC	Map
St Catherine's Hill, Dorset								
St Leonards And St Ives Heaths	✓		529.9	1,309.4	50.827°N 1.821°W; SU127031	1999	SAM, CP, SPA, WT, MOD, Ramsar site, SAC,	Map
Stoborough & Creech Heaths	✓		338.0	835.2	50.665°N 2.109°W; SY924850	1986	AONB, SPA, NNR, Ramsar site, SAC	Map
Stokeford Heaths	✓		177.3	438.0	50.693°N 2.205°W; SY856882	1995	SPA, Ramsar site, SAC	Map
Studland and Godlingston Heath NNR	✓	✓	757.8	1,872.6	50.655°N 1.969°W; SZ023839	1986	AONB, SPA, GCR, NNR, NT, NCR, Ramsar site, SAC	Map
Studland Cliffs	✓	✓	21.1	52.2	50.641°N 1.936°W; SZ046824	1986	AONB, GCR, NT, SAC	Map
Sutton Combe	✓		16.7	41.2	50.943°N 2.178°W; ST876160	1986	AONB	Map
Sutton Meadows	✓		5.0	12.3	50.895°N 1.92°W; SU057106	1985	AONB, WT	Map
Sydling Valley Downs	✓		74.0	182.8	50.816°N 2.512°W; ST640019	1985	AONB, SAC	Map
Thrasher's Heath	✓		14.8	36.6	50.655°N 2.044°W; SY970839	1984	AONB, HC, Ramsar site, SAC	Map
Toller Porcorum	✓		178.5	441.0	50.792°N 2.637°W; SY552993	1986	AONB, SAC	Map
Town Common	✓	✓	256.0	632.6	50.763°N 1.8°W; SZ142960	1994	SPA, GCR, WT, Ramsar site, SAC	Map
Townsend	✓		13.6	33.6	50.603°N 1.967°W; SZ024781	1986	AONB, WT, SAC	Map
Trill Quarry		✓	1.4	3.5	50.911°N 2.58°W; ST593126	1989	GCR	Map
Turbary And Kinson Commons	✓		36.2	89.3	50.752°N 1.916°W; SZ060947	1988	SPA, Ramsar site, SAC	Map
Turners Puddle Heath	✓		391.0	966.2	50.717°N 2.261°W; SY817908	1990	SPA, Ramsar site, SAC	Map
Upton Heath	✓		218.9	540.9	50.748°N 2.024°W; SY984943	1990	SPA, NCR, Ramsar site, SAC	Map
Upwey Quarries And Bincombe Down		✓	6.5	16.0	50.668°N 2.46°W; SY676855	1992	AONB, GCR	Map
Valley Of Stones	✓	✓	80.4	198.7	50.689°N 2.572°W; SY597879	1996	SAM, AONB, GCR, NNR	Map
Verwood Heaths	✓		27.8	68.7	50.883°N 1.871°W; SU092093	1985	SPA, LNR, Ramsar site, SAC	Map
Wareham Common	✓		17.5	43.3	50.69°N 2.123°W; SY914878	1992		Map
Wareham Meadows	✓		210.9	521.1	50.684°N 2.098°W; SY932871	1987	AONB, SPA, HC, Ramsar site, SAC	Map
Warmwell Heath	✓		55.4	137.0	50.683°N 2.351°W; SY753871	1987	SPA, Ramsar site, SAC	Map
West Dorset Coast	✓	✓	598.5	1,478.9	50.725°N 2.844°W; SY405920	1991	AONB, GCR, NT, SAC	Map
Whetley Meadows	✓		8.1	19.9	50.765°N 2.669°W; SY529964	1985	AONB	Map
White Horse Hill	✓		60.0	148.3	50.658°N 2.406°W; SY714843	1991	AONB	Map
Winfrith Heath	✓		288.9	713.8	50.683°N 2.279°W; SY804871	1996	SPA, WT, NCR, Ramsar site, SAC	Map
Woolcombe	✓		18.1	44.8	50.759°N 2.628°W; SY558957	1986	AONB, SAC	Map
Wootton Fitzpaine	✓		9.6	23.8	50.755°N 2.914°W; SY356954	1987	AONB, HC	Map
Worgret Heath	✓		8.3	20.6	50.683°N 2.151°W; SY894870	1987	SPA, SAC	Map

== Notes ==
^{A} Data rounded to one decimal place.
^{B} Grid reference is based on the British national grid reference system, also known as OSGB36, and is the system used by the Ordnance Survey.
^{C} Link to maps using the Nature on the Map service provided by English Nature.
