= Oakers Bog =

Protected area in Dorset, England

Coordinates: 50.72552°N 2.26629°W

Oakers Bog (grid reference SY813918) is a 30.7 hectare biological and geological Site of Special Scientific Interest (SSSI) in Dorset, notified in 1988. It is located 2km north of the village Moreton and includes the wet area called Rimsmoor. This area is protected because of the diversity of species within peatland bog and heathland habitats and importance of the site for palynology (reconstructung past vegetation from the historic record of pollen grains). The borders of this protected area are contiguous with Turners Puddle Heath SSSI, and so this protected area, that is composed of two separate patches, is part of a wider area of nature protection.

== Biology ==
Moss species in the bog include Sphagnum papillosum, Sphagnum pulchrum and Sphagnum magellanicum. Herbaceous plants in the bog habitat include bog asphodel, round-leaved sundew, bog myrtle and marsh gentian. The aquatic plant bog pondweed is also present.

In heathland habitats, plants include heather, bell heather and dwarf gorse. Dry heathland in this protected area contains sand lizard and smooth snake. Grass snake and palmate newt have also been recorded in this protected area.

Insect species in this protected area include large marsh grasshopper, bog bush cricket and small red damselfly. The raft spider has also been recorded in this protected area.

== Palynology ==
Pollen recorded in this protected area, and particularly at the wet area referred to as Rimsmoor provide evidence of vegetation change since the early Holocene.

== Land ownership ==
Part of Oakers Bog SSSI is owned by the Forestry Commission. Forestry plantations were historically made at Bryantspuddle Heath.

== Sources ==
- English Nature citation sheet for the site (accessed 31 August 2006)
