= Povington And Grange Heaths =

Protected area in Dorset, England

Coordinates: 50°39′0″N 2°9′54″W

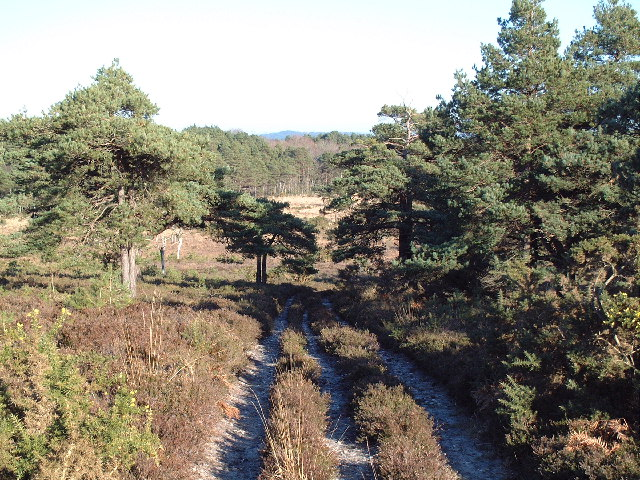
Grange Heath

Povington and Grange Heaths is a Site of Special Scientific Interest (SSSI) within Dorset National Landscape in Dorset, England. It is located 4km southwest of Wareham. This protected area includes Highwood Heath, West Holme Heath, Grange Heath, Povington Heath, Povington Wood and Kings Standing. This area is protected for its heathland and bog habitats. Lulworth Ranges military area overlays some of the protected area. Povington and Grange Heaths SSSI also includes Coombe Heath Nature Reserve.

Povington and Grange Heaths SSSI adjoins South Dorset Coast SSSI, and so is part of a wider area of nature protection.

== Biology ==
Heathland contains heather, bell heather, cross-leaved heath and common gorse. In wet areas of the heath, plants include round-leaved sundew, oblong-leaved sundew, great sundew, marsh orchid, heath spotted orchid, marsh gentian and marsh clubmoss. Moss species include Sphagnum pulchrum.

Plants in acid grassland contain devils-bit scabious, saw-wort, lousewort, petty whin and sneezewort. The moss Calliergonella cuspidata is also found in this grassland.

Insects in this protected area include small red damselfly, ishnura, large marsh grasshopper and the long-winged conehead. This protected area also contains sand lizard and smooth snake. Bird species in this protected area include dartford warbler, nightjar and nightingale.

== Land ownership ==
Most of the land within Povington and Grange Heaths SSSI is owned by the Ministry of Defence and includes Lulworth Ranges. Povington and Grange Heaths SSSI includes Grange Heath, most of which is owned and managed by the Royal Society for the Protection of Birds. Grange Heath is included within Purbeck Heaths National Nature Reserve.
