= Hartland Moor =

Site of Special Scientific Interest in Dorset, England

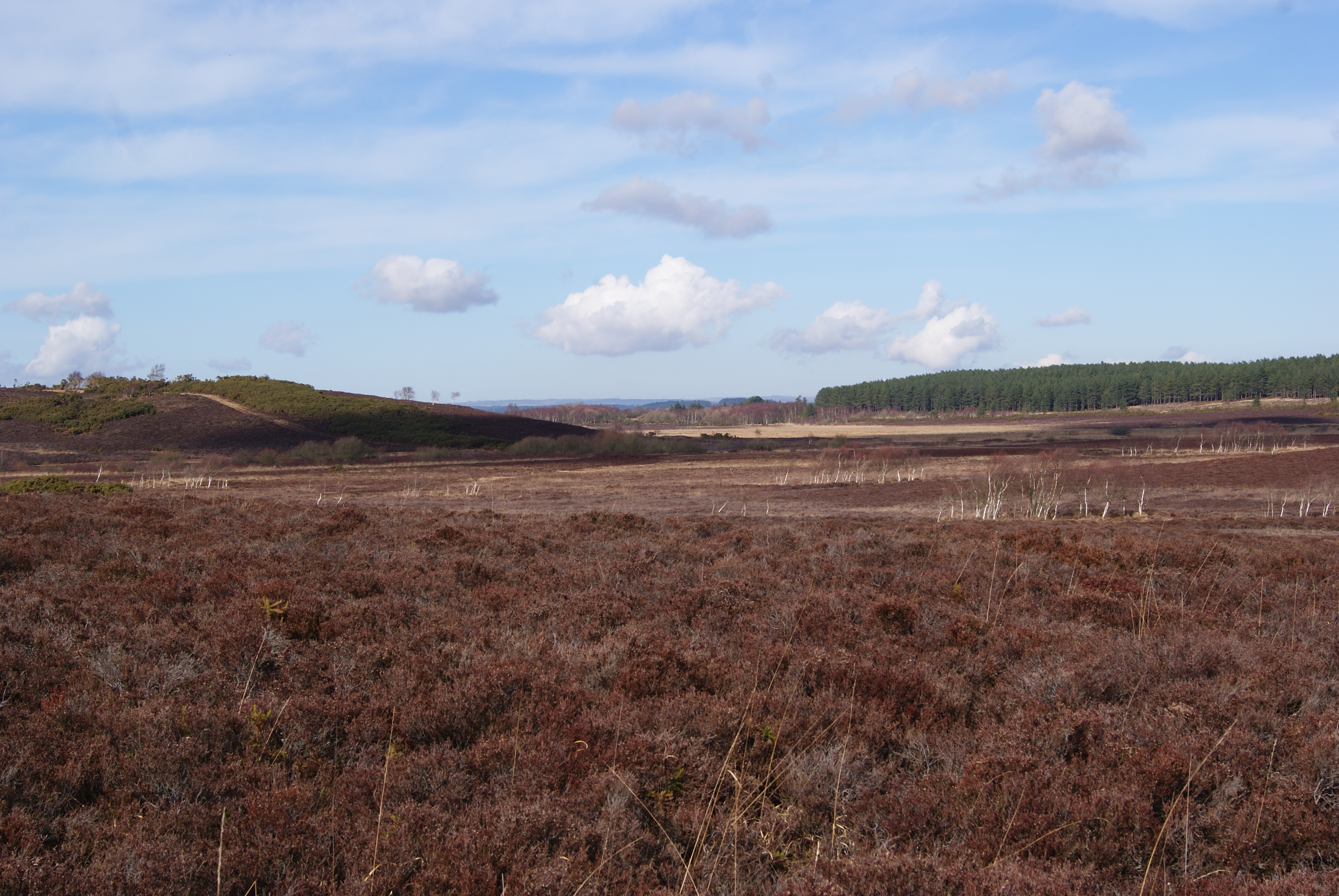
- Open heathland on Hartland Moor
- Interactive map of Hartland Moor
- Type: Heath
- Location: Dorset, England
- Nearest town: Wareham
- Coordinates: 50.666°N 2.071°W
- Area: 741.1 acres (299.9 ha)
- Status: SSSI

Hartland Moor is a Site of Special Scientific Interest (SSSI) on the south side of Poole Harbour near the town of Wareham in Dorset, England. It consists of lowland heathland.

== Protected area status ==
Hartland Moor was declared a national nature reserve in 1954, under the National Parks and Access to the Countryside Act 1949. That designation applies to 243 hectares (600 acres) of the site; it is part of a larger area that was notified as an SSSI in 1986. The northeastern part of the original SSSI was later excluded to become part of Poole Harbour SSSI; currently the Hartland Moor SSSI has an area of 299.9 hectares (741 acres). A large part of the site is owned by the National Trust.

== Ecological characteristics ==
The site is a lowland heathland. Plant communities range from dry heath to valley mire. Together with adjoining reserves, Hartland Moor forms one of the largest areas of lowland heath and mire in the county—known as the Dorset Heaths. The underlying soil, which formed on sands and clay of the Bagshot Beds, is very low in fertility.

The site has a Y-shaped drainage system running from east to west. The two arms of the stream display a large and unusual contrast in water chemistry. Water in the northern arm is acidic, while water in the southern arm is moderately high in calcium and moderately alkaline. Immediately downstream from the confluence, water is intermediate in composition, becoming increasingly acidic as it flows downstream. The wetland surrounding the northern branch of the stream supports acid-loving wetland plants; golden bog-moss is abundant in this area. The wetland around the southern branch supports wetland plants that thrive in alkaline conditions; it is dominated by black bog-rush, which forms tussocks. Rare plants on the site include Dorset heath, and, around a series of pools, bog sedge and the rare bog orchid (Hammarbya).

The plants on the site are in turn a habitat for various animals, both local and rare. All six British reptile species are present on the site; the rare sand lizard and smooth snake both breed on the property. The site is grazed by a herd of Red Devon cattle that help to keep scrub vegetation from taking over the habitat. Gorse found on the dry heath provides habitat for the European stonechat and the rare Dartford warbler, which is only present on a few sites in the United Kingdom. There is a hide for birdwatching on the site.

== Railway ==
Hartland Moor was the location of the first railway in Dorset; built in 1805, the Middlebere Plateway transported ball clay from Corfe Castle through the moor to Poole Harbour.

== See also ==
- List of SSSIs in Dorset
