= Ferndown Common =

Site of Special Scientific Interest in Dorset, England

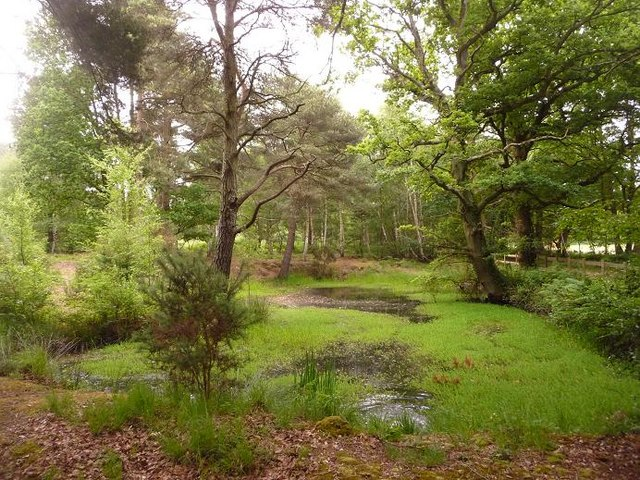
- A small pond on Ferndown Common
- Interactive map of Ferndown Common
- Type: Heath
- Location: Dorset, England
- Nearest town: Ferndown
- Coordinates: 50.7986°N 1.8996°W
- Area: 64.7 hectares (160 acres)
- Status: SSSI

Ferndown Common is a Site of Special Scientific Interest (SSSI) on the edge of Ferndown in Dorset, England. It is currently owned by the Wimborne Estate and leased to the Amphibian and Reptile Conservation Trust (ARC), who manage it to preserve the site's rare wildlife. The site was notified as an SSSI in 1984.

The area of the site is 64.7 hectares (160 acres), and comprises a significant amount of heath—primarily the dry heath Calluna vulgaris and Erica cinerea, but locally dominant are the damp or humid heath Erica tetralix and Molinia caerulea. Rare heathland species include the sand lizard (Lacerta agilis), smooth snake (Coronella austriaca), heath grasshopper (Chorthippus vagansand) and the Dartford warbler (Sylvia undata). Other local heathland species at Ferndown Common include the silver-studded blue butterfly (Plebejus argus), European nightjar (Caprimulgus europaeus) and European stonechat. In the south-east of the site there are several small ponds, which support at least 14 species of dragonflies, most of which are heathland species. Also resident in the ponds are large populations of the widespread, although in decline, common frog (Rana temporaria) and palmate newt (Triturus helveticus).

The site is very flat, although there are several small clay or gravel pits, and an extensive network of boundary banks which date back to the Inclosure Acts of the eighteenth and nineteenth centuries. There is also a steep escarpment running down to the Stour Valley, which in the past was a well-used travel route. Some cultivation of the land was attempted during the Second World War, as evidenced by areas of ridge and furrow. Ferndown Common was designated as a town green in 2003.

== See also ==
- List of SSSIs in Dorset
