= Parley Common =

Protected area in Dorset, England

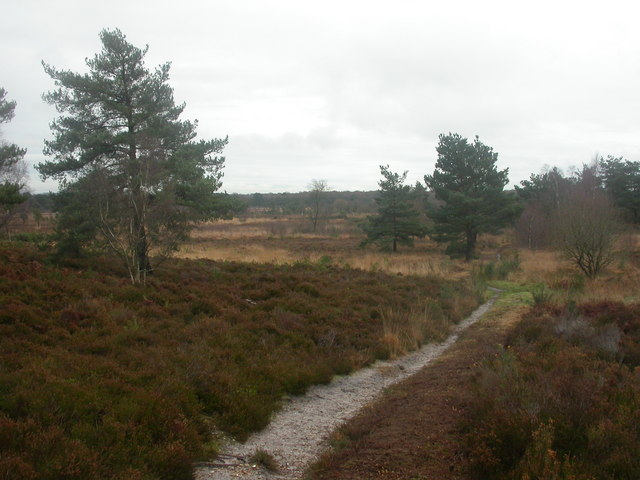
- Example of the heath, widespread on Parley Common
- Interactive map of Parley Common
- Type: Heath
- Location: Dorset, England
- Nearest town: Ferndown
- Coordinates: 50.784801°N 1.88121°W
- Area: 168.1 hectares (415 acres)
- Status: SSSI

Parley Common is a Site of Special Scientific Interest (SSSI) on the edge of Ferndown in Dorset, England. The majority land owner is the Canford Estate, but among the other owners are the Diocese of Salisbury, Dorset Council and a few private individuals. Most of the site is managed by the Amphibian and Reptile Conservation Trust (ARC); the Council's Countryside Service manages the land owned by Dorset Council. The site was notified as an SSSI in 1983.

The area of the site is 168.1 hectares (415 acres), and comprises a significant amount of heath; the northern and western parts are primarily of the dry heath Calluna vulgaris and Erica cinerea, while the low-lying parts of the south-east are mostly the damp or humid heath Erica tetralix and Molinia caerulea. Rare heathland species include the sand lizard (Lacerta agilis), smooth snake (Coronella austriaca), heath grasshopper (Chorthippus vagansand) and the Dartford warbler (Sylvia undata). Parley Common has an abundance of spider fauna—at least 147 species—which includes the very rare Ero aphana, Bassaniodes robustus (syn. Xysticus robustus)—otherwise found in only a few places in the New Forest—and Gnaphosa lugubris. The site holds claim to a number of firsts: the smooth snake was first recorded in Britain in Parley Common in 1853; the Mazarine blue (Cyaniris semiargus)—now extinct in Britain—was first discovered here in the late nineteenth century; the moth Pachythelia villosella and the ringed carpet moth (Cleora cinctaria) were also first discovered here.

The site is one of many areas in the South East Dorset in which grazing by cattle has been reintroduced, as part of efforts to control the growth of scrub. Arson and illegal vehicle use have caused damage to the site, although community involvement is thought to have lessened the number of incidents.

== See also ==
- List of SSSIs in Dorset
