= Poors Allotment =

Nature reserve in Surrey, England

Coordinates: 51.360°N 0.726°W

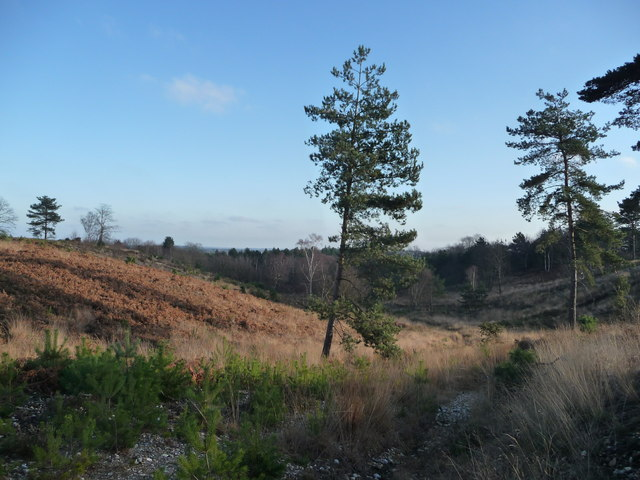
- Interactive map of Poors Allotment
- Type: Nature reserve
- Location: Camberley, Surrey
- OS grid: SU888631
- Area: 76 hectares (190 acres)
- Manager: Surrey Wildlife Trust

Poors Allotment is a 76-hectare (190-acre) nature reserve north of Camberley in Surrey. It is owned by Windlesham United Charities and managed by the Surrey Wildlife Trust. It is part of Thames Basin Heaths Special Protection Area and Broadmoor to Bagshot Woods and Heaths Site of Special Scientific Interest.

This site got its name because it was set aside under section 25 of the Windlesham Inclosure Act 1812 (52 Geo. 3. c. clxvi) to allow poor people to gather turf and bracken as fuel. It has heath, acid grassland and woods. Its importance lies in its fauna, such as woodlarks, nightjars, Dartford warblers, adders and several species of butterfly.

Allotment for the Poor of the Parish of Windlesham.

XXV And be it further enacted, That the said Commissioners shall, in the next Place, set out, allot and award, either in One Allotment or Two or mort Allotments, for the Poor of the said Parish of Windlesham, so much and such Part or Parts of the said Commonable Grounds, Heath; and Waste Lands hereby intended to be divided, alotted, and inclosed, not exceeding in the whole Five hundred Acres, as the said Commissioners shall think proper; and the said Allotment or Allotments shall, after the Execution of the said Award of the said Commissioners, be vested in the Rector, Churchwardens, and Overseers of the Poor of the said Parish of Windlesham for the Time being, for ever, as Trustees of the Poor of the said Parish; and after the said Allotment or Allotments shall be set out, such of the poor Inhabitants of the said Parish of Windlesham as shall be legally settled therein, and shall not respectively occupy Houses, Lands, or Tenements, of more than the yearly Value of Six Pounds, shall, both before and after the Execution of the said Award, be at Liberty to enter into and upon the said Allotment or Allotments, or any Part or Parts thereof, and to cut, dig, and carry away any Turves, Furze, Fern. or other Fuel in, upon, from, and out of the same, in such Manner, at such Time or Times, and according to such Rules and Directions as the said Trustees for the Time being, or the major Part of them, shall appoint and prescribe; and after the said Allotment or Allotments shall be set out, the said Trustees for the Time being, or the major Part of them, are hereby empowered and required, from Time to Time, and both before and after the Execution of the said Award, to let, subject tosuch Right of cutting and digging Turves, Furze, Fern, and other Fuel as aforesaid, the Herbage of the said Allotment or Allotments, or any Part or Parts thereof to any Person or Persons whomsoever, for any Term or Time not exceeding in the whole Three Years, at the best yearly Rent or Rents that can be reasonably had or gotten for the same, and upon such Terms and Conditions as the said Trustees, for the Time being, shall think proper; and the Rents of the said Herbage shall, from Time to Time, be applied by the said Trustees, or the major Part of them, in the Purchase of Fuel for the Poor of the said Parish.

— Windlesham Inclosure Act 1812 (52 Geo. 3. c. clxvi)
