= Brand's Bay =

Bay in Poole Harbour, Dorset

Coordinates: 50°40′15″N 1°58′32″W

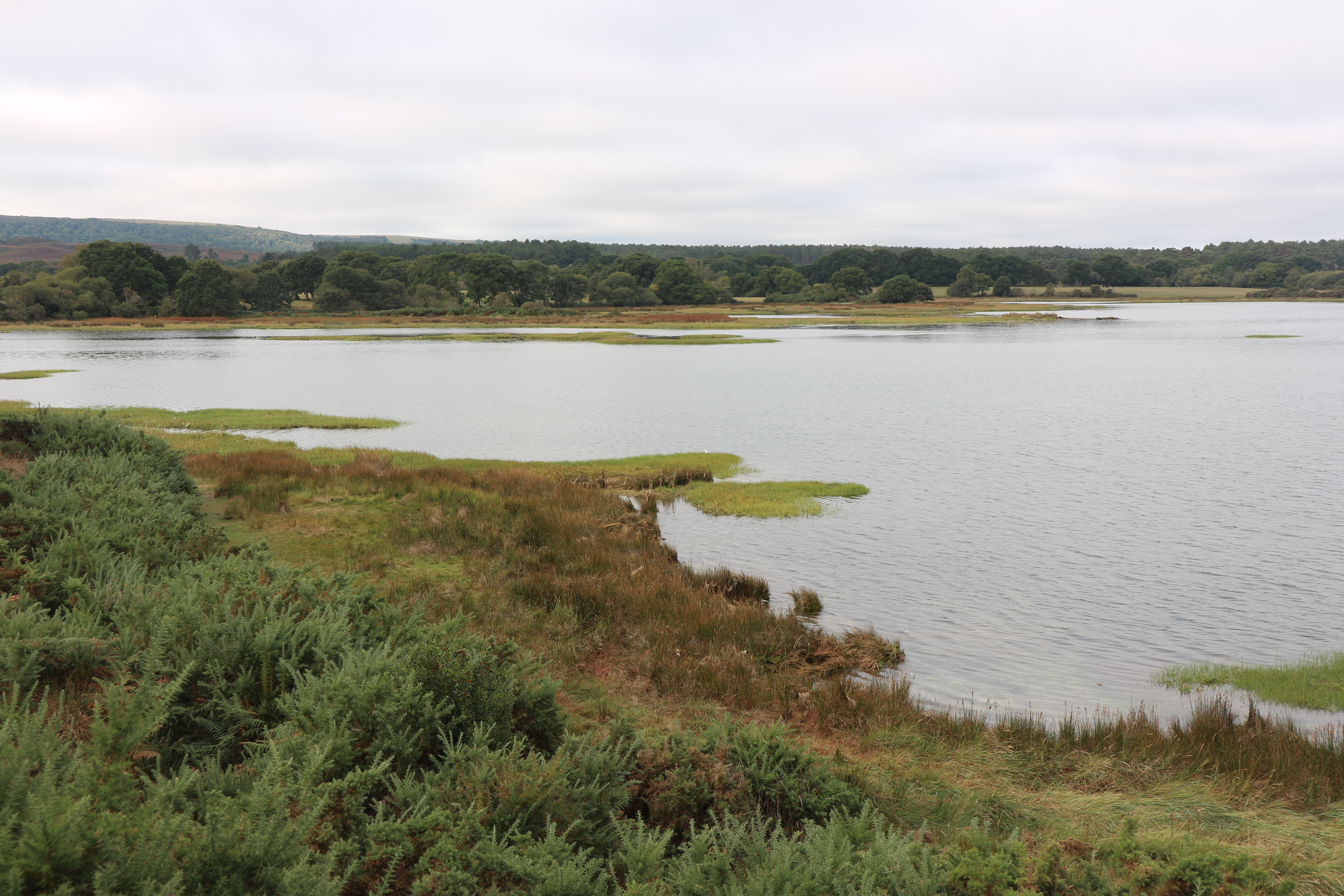
Marshland of Brand's Bay

Brand's Bay is an intertidal embayment in Poole Harbour in the county of Dorset on the south coast of England. It lies mostly within the Studland peninsula and is close to the village of Studland. It is a wetland and habitat for many species.

== Location ==
Brand's Bay is situated on the southern shore of Poole Harbour in Dorset. It is located on the Studland peninsula 3 miles (4.8 km) north of the town of Swanage and directly across the harbour from the Sandbanks estate in Poole. The bay is bordered to the east by the sand dunes of the Studland National Nature Reserve and to the west by the Wytch Farm oil field.

== Description ==
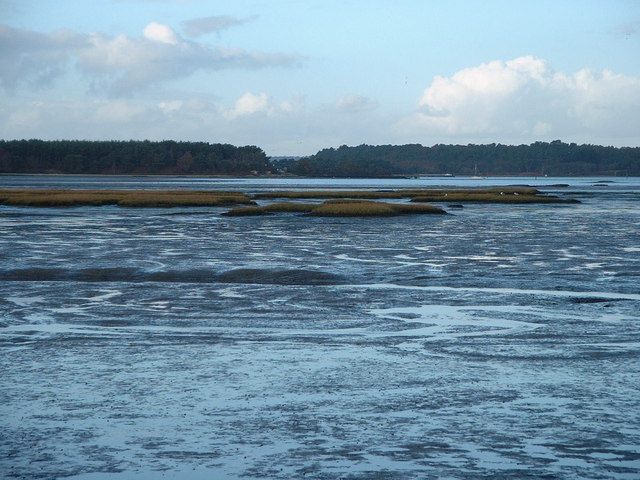
Drove Island, a shallow island in Brand's Bay

Brand's Bay is a shallow embayment on the southern shore of Poole Harbour. At low tide, much of the bay transforms into extensive mudflats and salt marshes, while at high tide it is entirely submerged. The bay is protected from the open sea due to Studland peninsula and the South Haven Point spit.

To the southwest, the Hartland Moor and Godlingstone Heath scenery are boundaries of the bay. Brand's Bay is undeveloped and is a sanctuary area for wildlife, especially birds, which wade the bay searching for food at low tide.

The bay is home to Drove Island (right), a small islet in the southern bay.

Human activity in the bay is strictly managed to protect its ecological sensitivity. There is a wooden bird hide on the southern shore that is reached by a 1.5 km all-weather track, significantly upgraded in 2024 to improve year-round accessibility. Use of the bay is restricted to birdwatching and nature conservation.

== Wildlife ==
The bay has a population of avocets which can often be seen in large numbers from the dedicated bird hide. Among other birds that can be observed are black-tailed godwit, bar-tailed godwit, dunlin, and curlew. The bay also attracts many dark-bellied brent geese throughout the winter period, along with different types of wildfowl like wigeon, teal, and shelduck. The habitat also shelters other rare animal species found in Britain.

The heath that adjoins the bay hosts six native reptiles to Britain, namely the sand lizard and the smooth snake.
