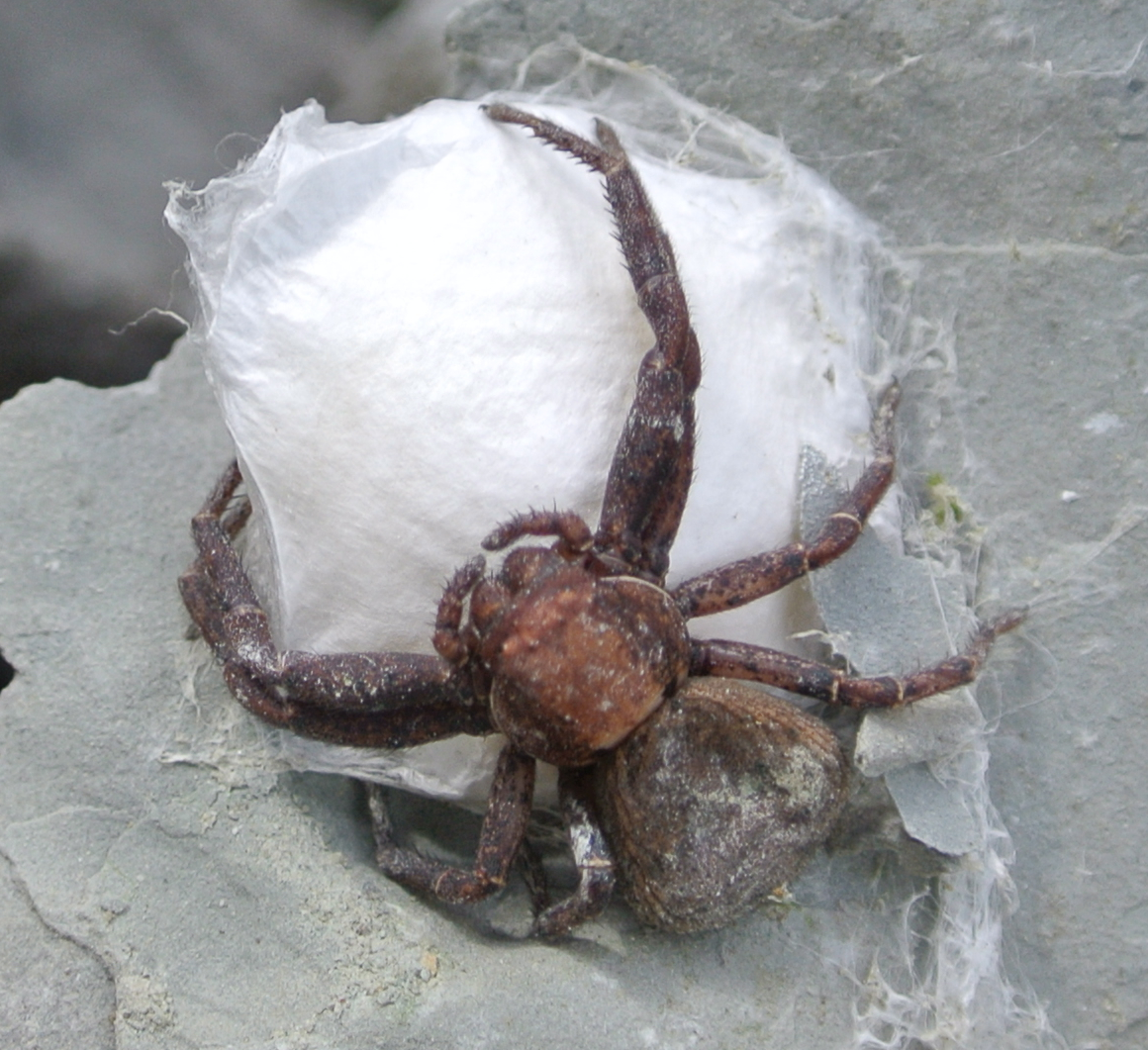
- In Hiiumaa, Estonia

Scientific classification
- Domain: Eukaryota
- Kingdom: Animalia
- Phylum: Arthropoda
- Subphylum: Chelicerata
- Class: Arachnida
- Order: Araneae
- Infraorder: Araneomorphae
- Family: Thomisidae
- Genus: Bassaniodes
- Species: B. robustus

Binomial name
- Bassaniodes robustus (Hahn, 1832)

Synonyms
- Thomisus robustus Hahn, 1832; Thomisus obscurus Hahn, 1833; Xysticus morio C. L. Koch, 1837; Xysticus fuscus C. L. Koch, 1837; Xysticus lanio C. L. Koch, 1845; Xysticus fuccatus Prach, 1866; Thomisus brevitarsis Simon, 1870; Xysticus robustus (Hahn, 1832); Thomisus fuscus (C. L. Koch, 1837)

= Bassaniodes robustus =

Species of spider

Bassaniodes robustus is a ground crab spider species found from Europe to Central Asia.

It is recorded in the fauna list of Parley Common, a Site of Special Scientific Interest in Dorset, England.

== Taxonomy ==
The species was first described in 1832 as Thomisus robustus. It was transferred to the genus Xysticus by Eugène Simon in 1875 and then to Bassaniodes in 2019.
