= Hog Cliff =

Hill in Dorset, England

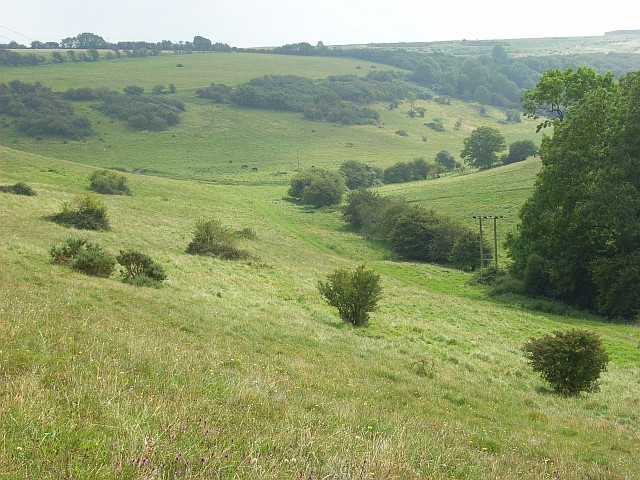
- View over Hog Cliff
- Interactive map of Hog Cliff
- Type: Chalk downland
- Location: Dorset, England
- Nearest city: Maiden Newton
- Coordinates: 50.777°N 2.541°W
- Area: 86.7 hectares (214 acres)
- Status: SSSI

Hog Cliff is a national nature reserve (NNR) and Site of Special Scientific Interest (SSSI) located 2 kilometres (1.2 mi) south east of Maiden Newton, Dorset and north-west of Dorchester. It was notified as an SSSI in 1981. The site is also part of the much larger Dorset National Landscape area. It is adjacent to the Court Farm, Sydling SSSI.

The area of the site is 86.7 hectares (214 acres). It in the Dorset Downs, an area of chalk downland. The site includes grassland, scrub and a small amount of woodland (mostly ash and oak, with a hazel and field maple understory); within the grassland there is a difference in character, and the species that it supports, which varies according to the gradient and aspect of the slopes. While the invertebrates on the site have not been extensively studied, it is known that species such as the rare Adonis blue and marsh fritillary butterflies can be found there; this is in addition to more common species such as the green hairstreak, common blue and gatekeeper. Fungi, particularly grassland varieties, are very well represented at Hog Cliff; the SSSI citation indicates over 60 genera as having been identified, whilst Natural England claim 100 species for the NNR. Cattle and sheep graze the site throughout the year to keep the grassland open.

In 2008, a case was brought by the Environment Agency against a nearby pig farmer who was deliberately allowing pig slurry to be discharged onto land that included part of the Hog Cliff reserve.

== See also ==
- List of SSSIs in Dorset
