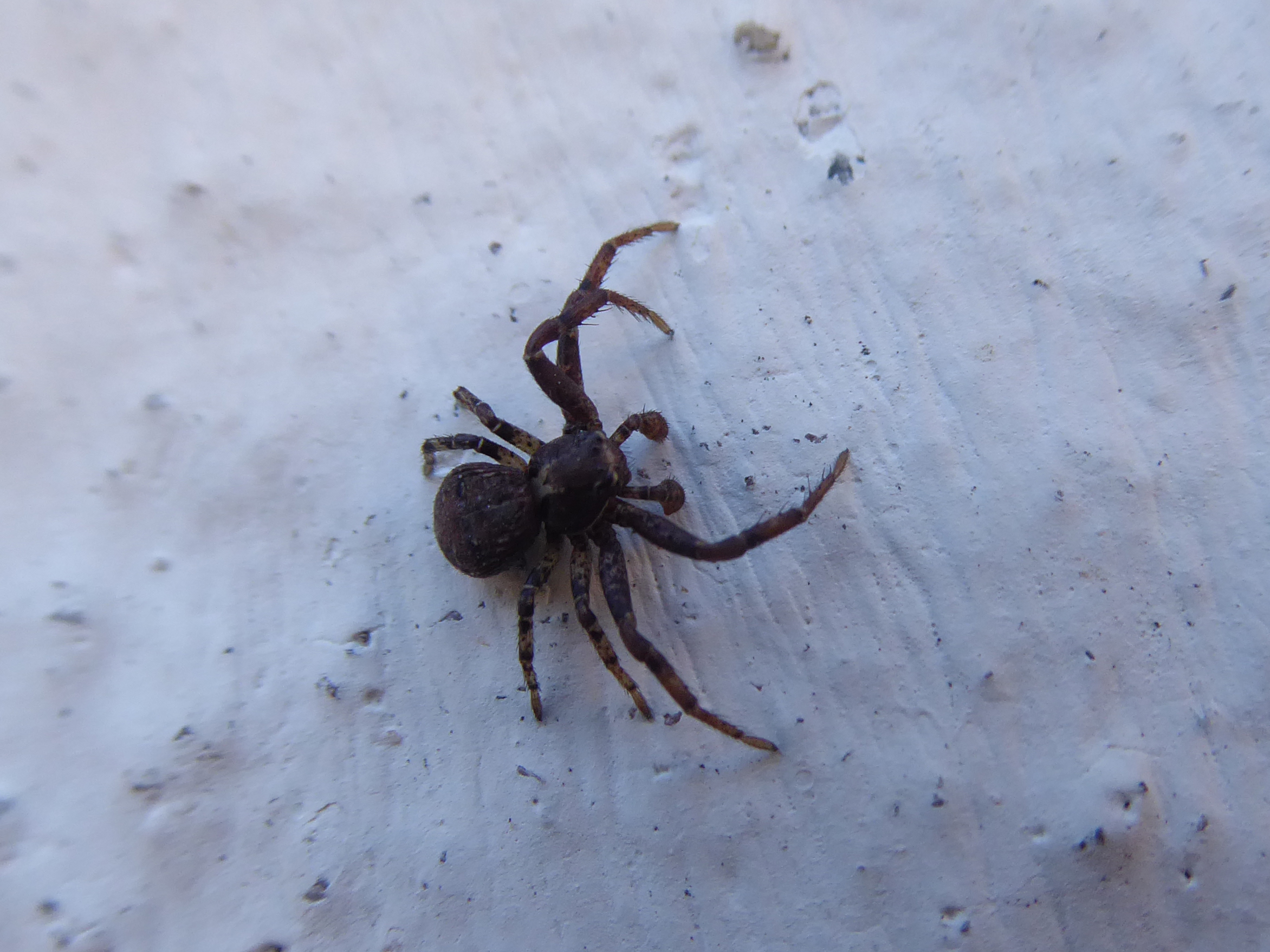

Scientific classification
- Kingdom: Animalia
- Phylum: Arthropoda
- Subphylum: Chelicerata
- Class: Arachnida
- Order: Araneae
- Infraorder: Araneomorphae
- Family: Thomisidae
- Genus: Bassaniodes; Pocock, 1903

Type species
- B. socotrensis Pocock, 1903

Species
- 39, see text

Synonyms
- Proxysticus Dalmas, 1922

= Bassaniodes =

Genus of spiders

Bassaniodes is a genus of crab spiders that was first described by Reginald Innes Pocock in 1903.

== Species ==
As of July 2022 it contains thirty-nine species and one subspecies, found in Africa, Europe, and Asia:

- Bassaniodes adzharicus (Mcheidze, 1971) – Georgia
- Bassaniodes anatolicus (Demir, Aktaş & Topçu, 2008) – Turkey
- Bassaniodes blagoevi Naumova, 2020 – Albania
- Bassaniodes bliteus (Simon, 1875) – Mediterranean
- Bassaniodes bufo (Dufour, 1820) – Mediterranean
- Bassaniodes canariensis (Wunderlich, 1987) – Canary Is.
- Bassaniodes caperatoides (Levy, 1976) – Israel
- Bassaniodes caperatus (Simon, 1875) – Mediterranean, Turkey, Ukraine, Russia (Caucasus)
- Bassaniodes clavulus (Wunderlich, 1987) – Canary Is.
- Bassaniodes cribratus (Simon, 1885) – Mediterranean, Russia (Europe), Turkey, Caucasus, Iran, China, Korea
- Bassaniodes dolpoensis (Ono, 1978) – Nepal, China
- Bassaniodes egenus (Simon, 1886) – West Africa
- Bassaniodes falx (Wunderlich, 2022) – Canary Is.
- Bassaniodes ferus (O. Pickard-Cambridge, 1876) – Cyprus, Egypt, Israel
- Bassaniodes fienae (Jocqué, 1993) – Spain
- Bassaniodes fuerteventurensis (Wunderlich, 1992) – Canary Is.
- Bassaniodes graecus (C. L. Koch, 1837) – Balkans, Greece, Ukraine, Russia (Europe), Turkey, Israel, Iraq
- Bassaniodes grohi (Wunderlich, 1992) – Madeira
- Bassaniodes hariaensis (Wunderlich, 2022) – Canary Is.
- Bassaniodes lalandei (Audouin, 1826) – Mediterranean, Azerbaijan
- Bassaniodes lanzarotensis (Wunderlich, 1992) – Canary Is., Savage Is.
- Bassaniodes loeffleri (Roewer, 1955) – Greece, Turkey, Caucasus, Iran, Kazakhstan, Central Asia
- Bassaniodes madeirensis (Wunderlich, 1992) – Madeira
- Bassaniodes obesus (Thorell, 1875) – Ukraine, Russia (Europe)
- Bassaniodes ovadan (Marusik & Logunov, 1995) – Turkmenistan
- Bassaniodes ovcharenkoi (Marusik & Logunov, 1990) – Central Asia
- Bassaniodes pinocorticalis (Wunderlich, 1992) – Canary Is.
- Bassaniodes pseudorectilineus (Wunderlich, 1995) – Greece, Turkey
- Bassaniodes rectilineus (O. Pickard-Cambridge, 1872) – Syria, Lebanon, Israel, Iran
- Bassaniodes robustus (Hahn, 1832) – Europe to Central Asia
- Bassaniodes sardiniensis (Wunderlich, 1995) – Italy (Sardinia)
- Bassaniodes sinaiticus (Levy, 1999) – Egypt
- Bassaniodes socotrensis Pocock, 1903 (type) – Yemen (Socotra)
- Bassaniodes squalidus (Simon, 1883) – Canary Is., Madeira
- Bassaniodes tenebrosus (Šilhavý, 1944) – East Mediterranean
  - Bassaniodes t. ohridensis (Šilhavý, 1944) – North Macedonia
- Bassaniodes tristrami (O. Pickard-Cambridge, 1872) – Greece, Turkey, Caucasus, Russia (Europe) to Central Asia, Middle East
- Bassaniodes turlan (Marusik & Logunov, 1990) – Central Asia
- Bassaniodes ulkan (Marusik & Logunov, 1990) – Russia (Europe), Kyrgyzstan
- Bassaniodes xizangensis (Tang & Song, 1988) – China

== See also ==
- List of Thomisidae species
