= Ham Common SSSI, Dorset =

Protected area in Dorset, England

Ham Common
- Site of Special Scientific Interest
- Location of Ham Common.
- Area of search: Dorset
- Grid reference: SY981907
- Coordinates: 50.715926°N 2.0282767°W
- Area: 79.0 acres (0.3197 km^{2}; 0.1234 sq mi)
- Notification date: 1987

Ham Common is a Site of Special Scientific Interest (SSSI) within Dorset Heathlands Ramsar site, in Dorset, England. It is located near Hamworth and includes a stretch of cliff along the north side of Poole Harbour.

== Geology ==
Fossilised plants from the Eocene epoch have been recovered from clay deposits within this protected area. The pipe-clay deposits hold fossils that would currently be regarded as tropical.

== Biology ==
Dry heathland dominates the site. Sand Lizard has been recorded in this protected area. Bird species include the Dartford Warbler.

== Land ownership ==
Ham Common SSSI consists of two areas of land. The northern unit is near the mainline railway, the southern unit borders the harbour. Part of the northern unit is owned by the Ministry of Defence.
