= Gnaphosa lugubris =

Scientific classification
- Kingdom: Animalia
- Phylum: Arthropoda
- Subphylum: Chelicerata
- Class: Arachnida
- Order: Araneae
- Infraorder: Araneomorphae
- Family: Gnaphosidae
- Genus: Gnaphosa
- Species: G. lugubris

Binomial name
- Gnaphosa lugubris (C. L. Koch, 1839)

Species of spider

Gnaphosa lugubris is a ground spider species found from Europe to Central Asia.

It is recorded in the fauna list of Parley Common, a Site of Special Scientific Interest in Dorset, England.
