= Turners Puddle Heath =

Protected area in Dorset, England

- Site of Special Scientific Interest
- Location within Dorset
- Location of Turners Puddle Heath.
- Area of search: Dorset
- Grid reference: SY831904
- Coordinates: 50.712982°N 2.2407285°W
- Area: 963.9 acres (3.901 km^{2}; 1.506 sq mi)
- Notification date: 1990

Moreton Forest

Turners Puddle Heath is a Site of Special Scientific Interest north of Wool, near Bovington in Dorset, England. This protected area is located between the River Piddle and the River Frome. This protected area is within the Dorset Heathlands Ramsar site.

== Biology ==
This protected area includes the largest continuous patch of heathland in Dorset where plants include common heather and bell heather. Mosses Sphagnum compactum and Sphagnum tenellum occur in wetter areas of heathland.

The site also includes areas of bog habitat with pools where oblong-leaved sundew and round-leaved sundew and marsh gentian occur.

Insects present include small red damselfly, bog bush-cricket and silver studded blue butterfly. Reptile species include sand lizard and smooth snake. Bird species include stonechat, dartford warbler and nightjar.

== Archaeology ==
There is a bowl barrow in Turners Puddle Heath SSSI (this historic monument is also in the military training area).

== Land ownership and management ==
Parts of the protected area are managed by Dorset Council.

Major institutional landowners that own land within Turners Puddle Heath SSSI includes the Ministry of Defence and the Forestry Commission (Moreton Forest is within the protected area). Part of the protected area is within Bovington Camp where training in the use of military tanks takes place.
