= Drove Island =

Island in Poole Harbour, Dorset

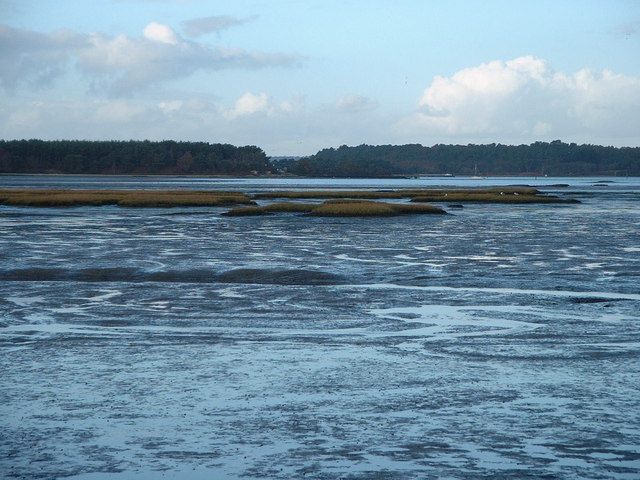
- Drove Island seen from Brands Bay
- Interactive map of Drove Island

Geography
- Location: Poole Harbour
- Coordinates: 50.665683°N 1.979217°W
- OS grid reference: SZ0154085382

Drove Island is a small uninhabited island in Brand's Bay, Poole Harbour, in the county of Dorset, England. There are no buildings on the island and it consists of mostly marsh.

The waters around the island are extremely shallow (usually around 48 cm) and it is only accessible by private boat.

Drove Island lies within the civil parish of Studland. The parish was formerly part of the Purbeck local government district, but now forms part of Dorset unitary authority.

== Ecology ==
The island supports birds including seagulls, avocets, spoonbills, and black-tailed godwits. These birds can usually be seen on the island. The seagrass around the island are nurseries for fish and shellfish due to the high mix of freshwater and seawater.
