= Abbotsbury Blind Lane =

Protected area in Dorset, England

Coordinates: 50.66851°N 2.60133°W

Abbotsbury Blind Lane (grid reference SY576856) is a 0.4 hectares (0.99 acres) geological Site of Special Scientific Interest in Dorset, notified in 1986; this area is slightly smaller than when it was first notified in 1977. It is also a Geological Conservation Review (GCR) site.

== Sources ==
- English Nature citation sheet for the site (accessed 29 August 2006)
