= Bere Stream =

Protected area in Dorset, England

Coordinates: 50.73284°N 2.19974°W

Bere Stream (grid reference SY860926) is an 11.2 hectare biological Site of Special Scientific Interest in Dorset, notified in 1977.

== Sources ==
- English Nature citation sheet for the site (accessed 8 September 2006)
