= Poole Bay Cliffs =

Protected area in Poole, England

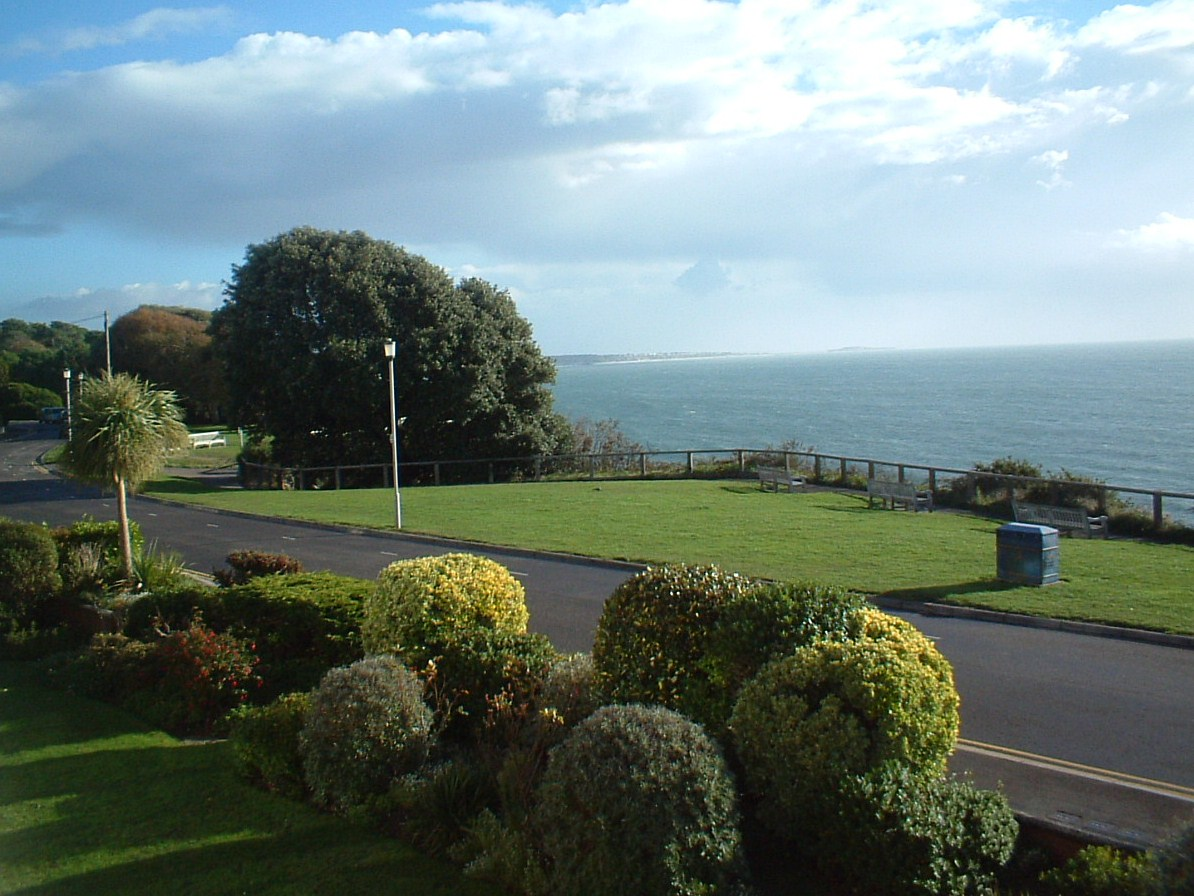
Clifftops at Canford Cliffs.

Poole Bay Cliffs is a Site of Special Scientific Interest, as prescribed by Natural England and the Department for Environment, Food and Rural Affairs. The site is in the Poole Bay area of Poole, Dorset, England.
