= Chalbury Hill and Quarry =

Site of Special Scientific Interest in Dorset

Coordinates: 50.65307°N 2.43422°W

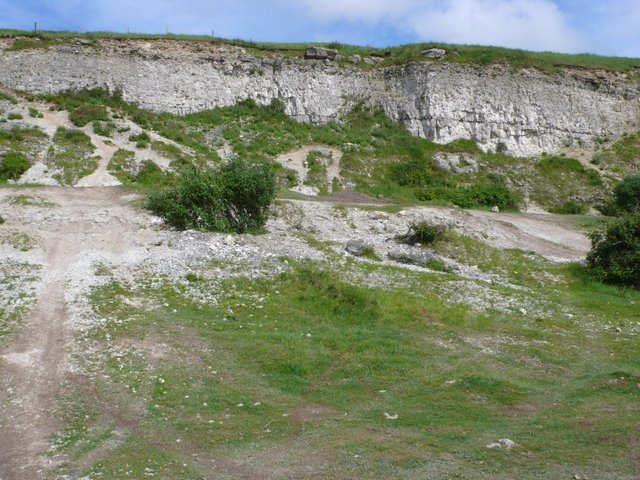
The quarry site

Chalbury Hill And Quarry (grid reference SY694838) is an 11.9 hectare biological and geological Site of Special Scientific Interest in Dorset, England, notified in 1977. The site consists of grassland (10.3 hectare) and a disused limestone quarry (1.6 hectare). The SSSI includes the area covered by Chalbury Hill Fort.
