= Conegar Road Cutting =

Protected area in Dorset, England

Coordinates: 50.82201°N 2.79780°W

Conegar Road Cutting (grid reference ST439028) is a 0.15 hectare geological Site of Special Scientific Interest in Dorset, notified in 1996.

== Sources ==
- English Nature citation sheet for the site (accessed 31 August 2006)
