= Aunt Mary's Bottom =

Biological site of Special Scientific Interest in Dorset, England

Coordinates: 50.81845°N 2.64584°W

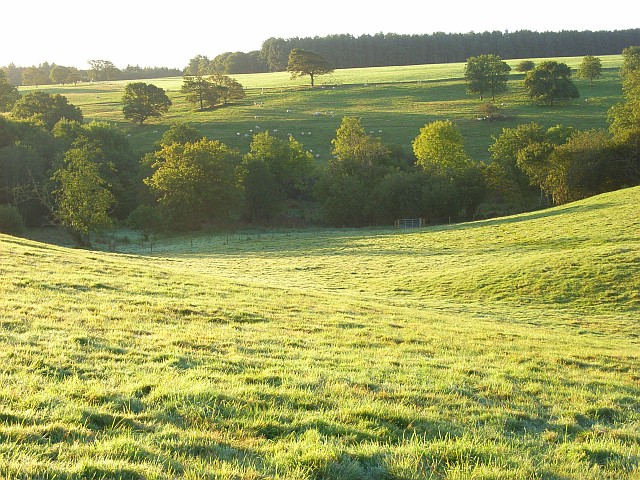
Aunt Mary's Bottom

Aunt Mary's Bottom (grid reference ST546023) is an 8.62 hectare biological Site of Special Scientific Interest in Dorset, England notified in 1991.

== Sources ==
- English Nature citation sheet for the site (accessed 10 August 2006)
