= Corfe & Barrow Hills =

Protected area in Dorset, England

Coordinates: 50.77528°N 1.99428°W

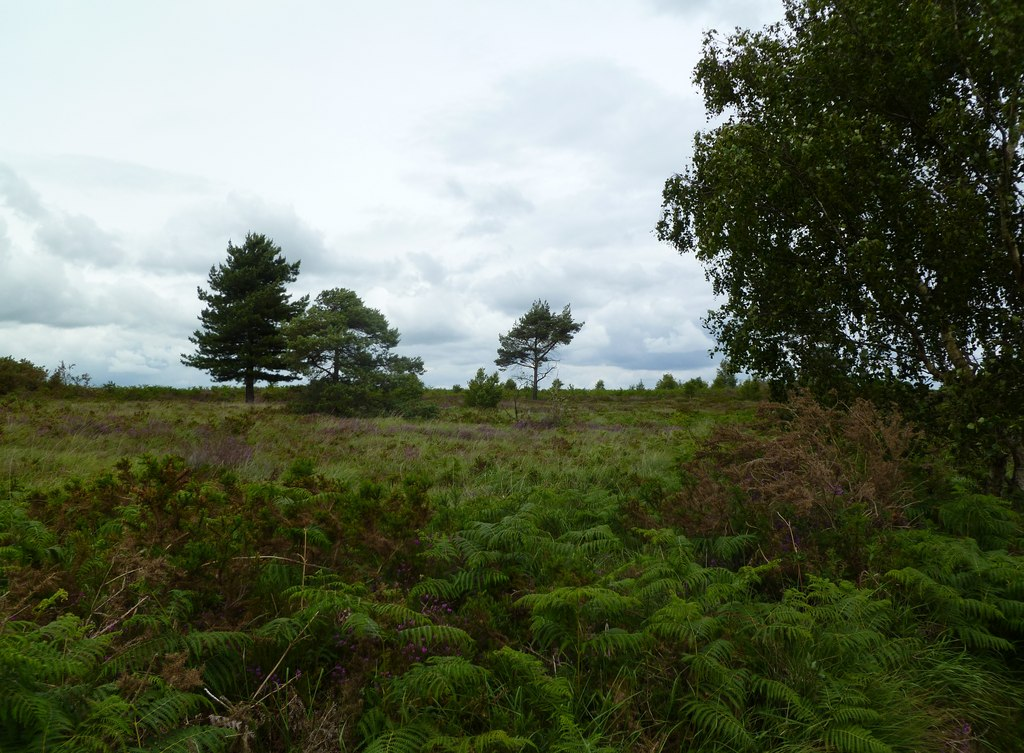
Corfe Hills, heathland

Corfe & Barrow Hills is a 102.8 hectare biological Site of Special Scientific Interest located in Ashington, Dorset, notified in 1986. One part of it is a Local Nature Reserve also called Corfe & Barrow Hills, while another part is Corfe Hills Local Nature Reserve.
