= Bradford Abbas Railway Cutting =

Protected area in Dorset, England

Coordinates: 50.92850°N 2.58191°W

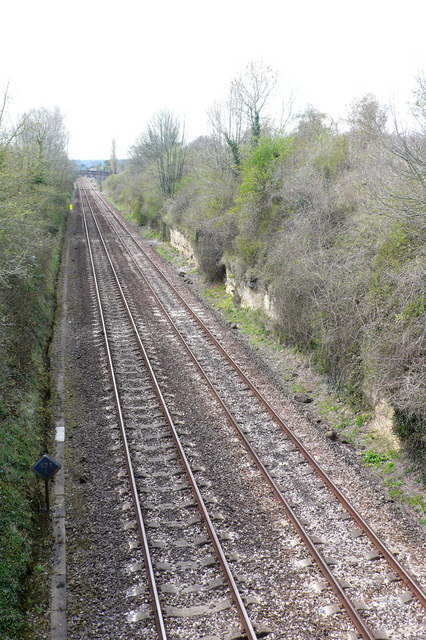
Railway Cutting, Bradford Abbas

Bradford Abbas Railway Cutting (grid reference ST592145) is a 1.4 hectare geological Site of Special Scientific Interest in Dorset, notified in 1990.

== Sources ==
- English Nature citation sheet for the site (accessed 31 August 2006)
