= Cull-Peppers Dish =

Protected area in Dorset, England

Coordinates: 50.73271°N 2.26492°W

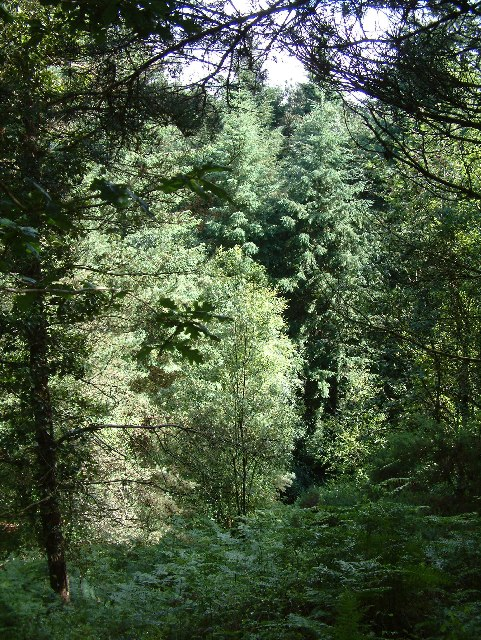
Cull-peppers Dish.

Cull-Peppers Dish (grid reference SY814926) is a 0.9-hectare (2.2-acre) sinkhole and geological Site of Special Scientific Interest in Dorset, notified in 1989.

The name of the site and that of the nearby Culpeper's Spoon were possibly named after the herbalist Nicholas Culpeper. Locally legends attribute the pits to the devil and another pit near by is named Devil 's or Hell 's Pit.

The site is used in Thomas Hardy's novel The Return of the Native as the place where Mrs Wildeve collects holly for a wreath.
