= Shillingstone Quarry =

Site of Special Scientific Interest in Dorset, England

Coordinates: 50.88741°N 2.25300°W

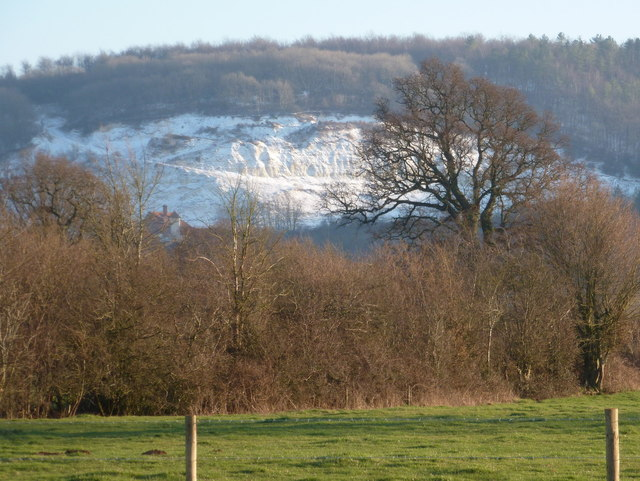
Shillingstone Quarry

Shillingstone Quarry SSSI, Dorset (grid reference ST823098) is an 8.13 hectare geological Site of Special Scientific Interest in Dorset, England, notified in 1995.

== Sources ==
- English Nature citation sheet for the site (accessed 31 August 2006)
