= Crookhill Brick Pit =

Protected area in Dorset, England

Coordinates: 50.617269°N 2.503857°W

Crookhill Brick Pit (grid reference SY644798) is a 4.77 hectare biological and geological Site of Special Scientific Interest in Dorset, England, notified in 2003.

It supports a large population of Great Crested Newts.

== Sources ==
- English Nature citation sheet for the site (accessed 31 August 2006)
