= Blashenwell Farm Pit =

Protected area in Dorset, England

Coordinates: 50.62418°N 2.06922°W

Blashenwell Farm Pit (grid reference SY952805) is an 11.4 hectare geological Site of Special Scientific Interest in Dorset, United Kingdom, notified in 1954. It is of scientific interest because the tufa at the site provides a detailed record of molluscan biostratigraphy and environmental history during the early- and mid-Flandrian interglacial.

== Sources ==
- English Nature citation sheet for the site (accessed 31 August 2006)
