= Black Hill Heath =

Coordinates: 50.74807°N 2.23524°W

Black Hill Heath (grid reference SY835943) is a 69.67 hectare biological Site of Special Scientific Interest in Dorset, notified in 1989.

== Sources ==
- English Nature citation sheet for the site (accessed 8 September 2006)
