= Corton Cutting =

Site of Special Scientific Interest in England

Coordinates: 50.66803°N 2.51501°W

Corton Cutting (grid reference SY637855) is a 0.24 hectare geological Site of Special Scientific Interest in Dorset, England, notified in 1997.

The site is listed in the Geological Conservation Review.

== Sources ==
- English Nature citation sheet for the site (accessed 31 August 2006)
