= Lions Hill =

Coordinates: 50.83544°N 1.85084°W

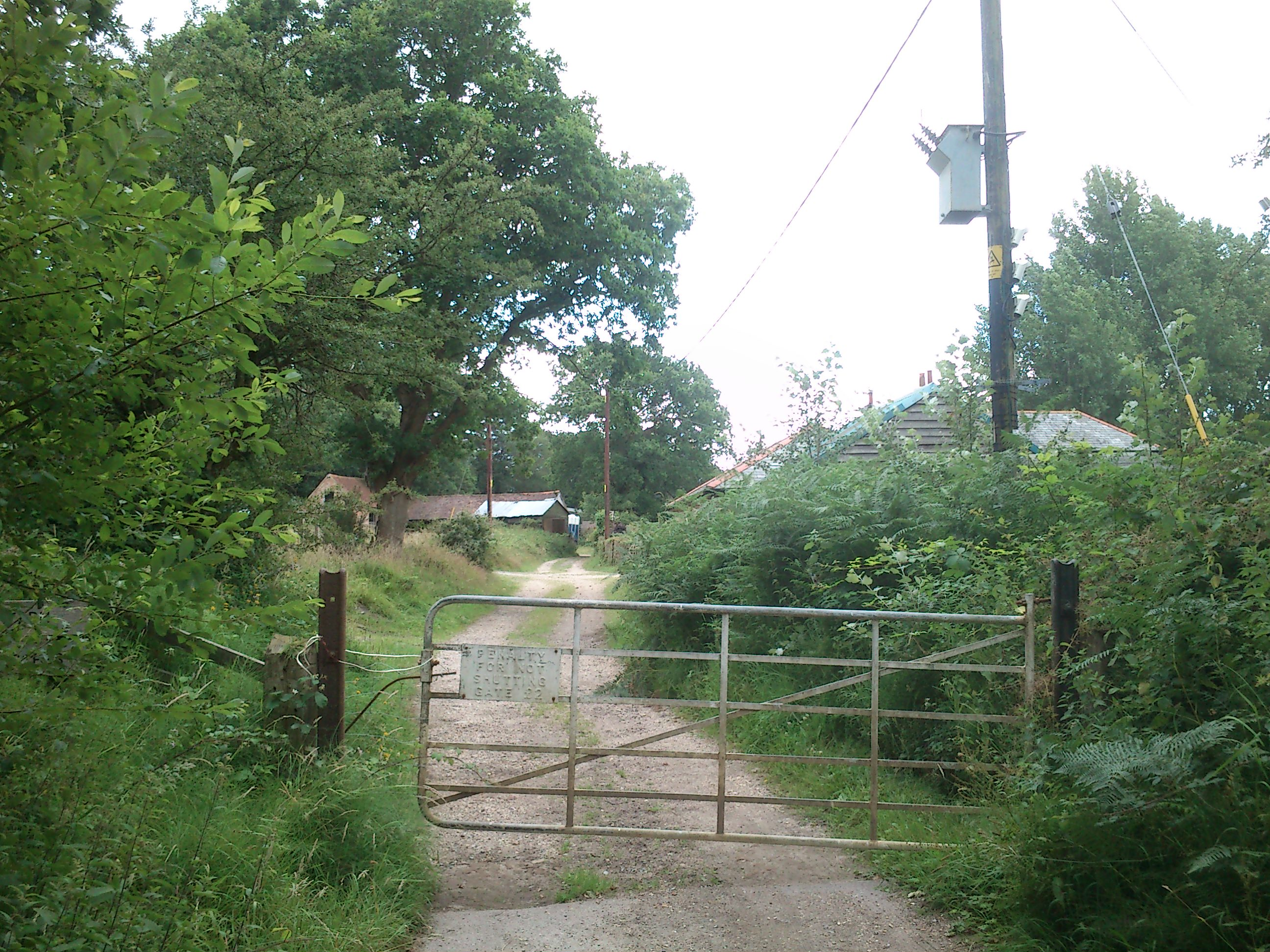
Lions Hill Farm

Lions Hill (grid reference SU106040) is a 42.9 hectare biological Site of Special Scientific Interest in Dorset, notified in 1985.
