= Worgret Heath =

Coordinates: 50.68346°N 2.14999°W

Worgret Heath SSSI, Dorset (grid reference SY895871) is an 8.4 hectare biological Site of Special Scientific Interest in Dorset, notified in 1987.

The site has a large population of Sand Lizards.

== Sources ==
- English Nature citation sheet for the site (accessed 31 August 2006)
