= Holnest SSSI, Dorset =

Biological site of interest

Coordinates: 50.89391°N 2.47484°W

Holnest SSSI, Dorset (grid reference ST667106) is a 54.83 hectare biological Site of Special Scientific Interest in Dorset, notified in 2004.

The site has a large population of Great Crested Newts.

== Sources ==
- English Nature citation sheet for the site (accessed 31 August 2006)
