= Boulsbury Wood =

Protected area in Dorset and Hampshire, England

Coordinates: 50.93980°N 1.90175°W

- Site of Special Scientific Interest
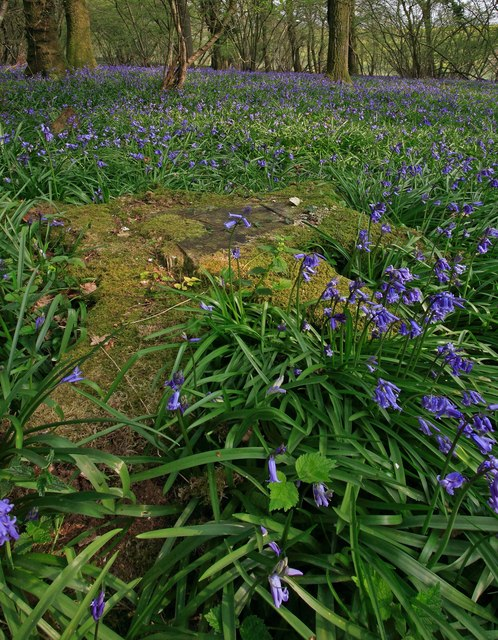
- Location of Boulsbury Wood.
- Area of search: Dorset; Hampshire
- Grid reference: SU 070 158
- Interest: Biological
- Area: 119.8 hectares (296 acres)
- Notification date: 1983
- Location map: Magic Map

Boulsbury Wood is a 119.8-hectare (296-acre) biological Site of Special Scientific Interest in Dorset and Hampshire. The site is west of Fordingbridge.

This site consists of parts of Boulsbury Wood, High Wood, Stone Hill Wood, Martin Wood and Blagdon Hill Wood. It has diverse habitats and flora, and Boulsbury Wood is the most species-rich wood in the county. Some parts are ancient woodland, with records dating from the thirteenth century.
