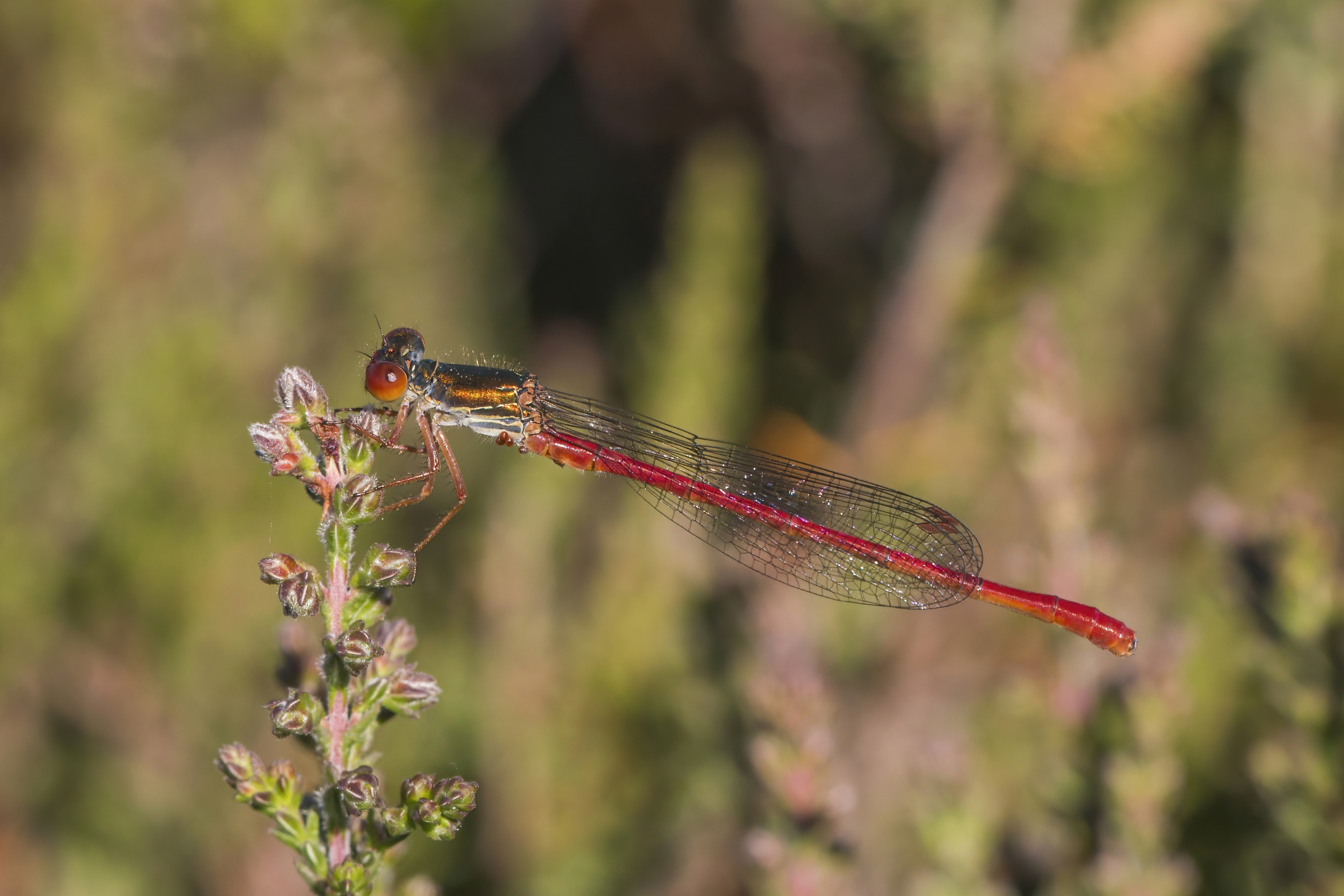
- Male
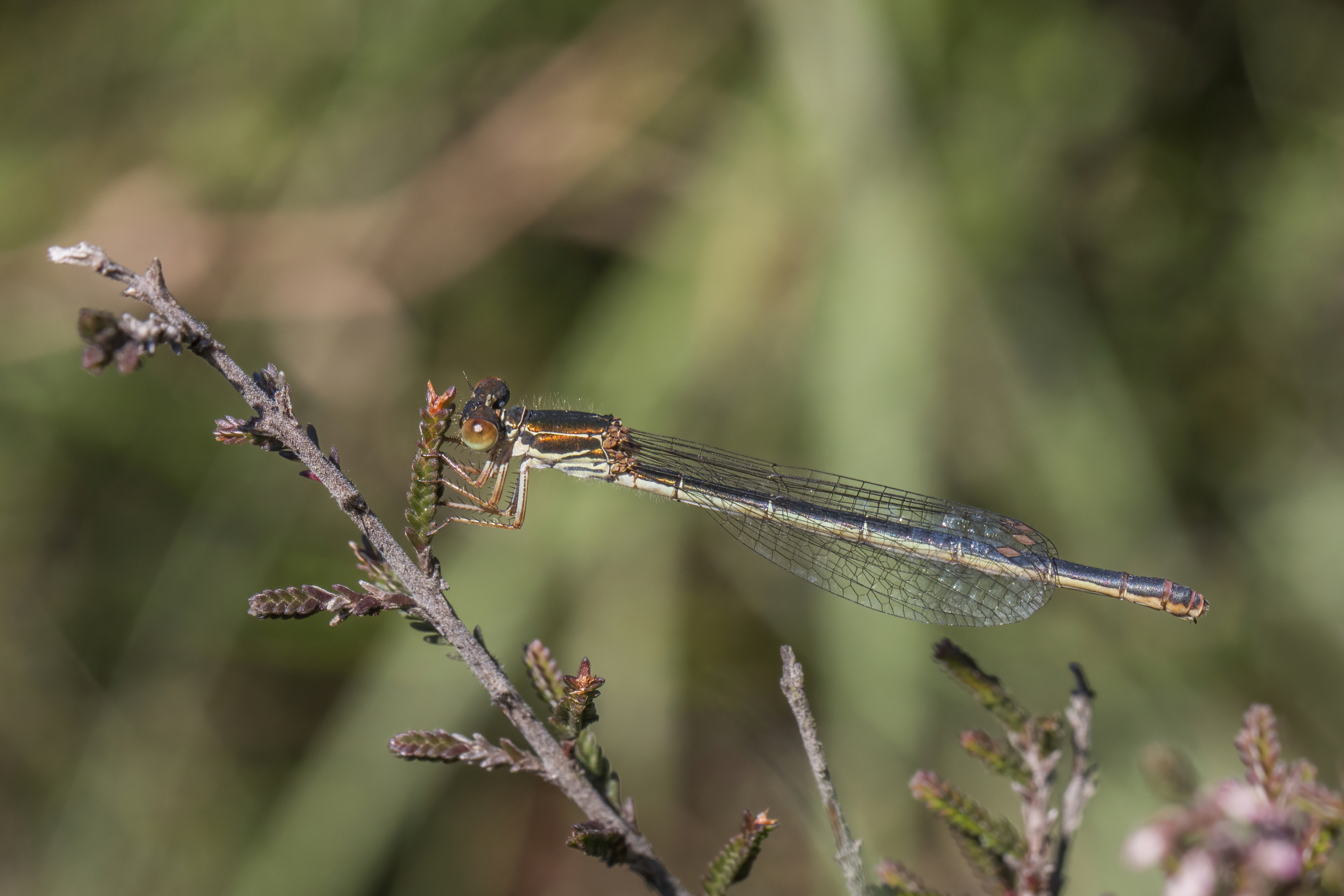
- Female, form melanogastrum both at Crockford Stream, New Forest; Hampshire, UK

Conservation status
- Least Concern (IUCN 3.1)

Scientific classification
- Kingdom: Animalia
- Phylum: Arthropoda
- Class: Insecta
- Order: Odonata
- Suborder: Zygoptera
- Family: Coenagrionidae
- Genus: Ceriagrion
- Species: C. tenellum

Binomial name
- Ceriagrion tenellum (De Villers, 1789)

= Small red damselfly =

Species of insect

The small red damselfly (Ceriagrion tenellum) is a small damselfly flying in heathland bogs and streams. It is in the family Coenagrionidae.

== Identification ==
Ceriagrion tenellum is only 25–35 millimetres (0.98–1.38 in) long. It is a lot shorter than the large red damselfly, with which it is sometimes confused. In both sexes the thorax is bronze-black on top.

The male has an entirely red abdomen.

The female has a bronze-black abdomen with only the front and back of it red. The dark form melanogastrum has an almost entirely dark abdomen marked with pale segment divisors, the last two of which are reddish. A very rare form, erythrogastrum, resembles the male.

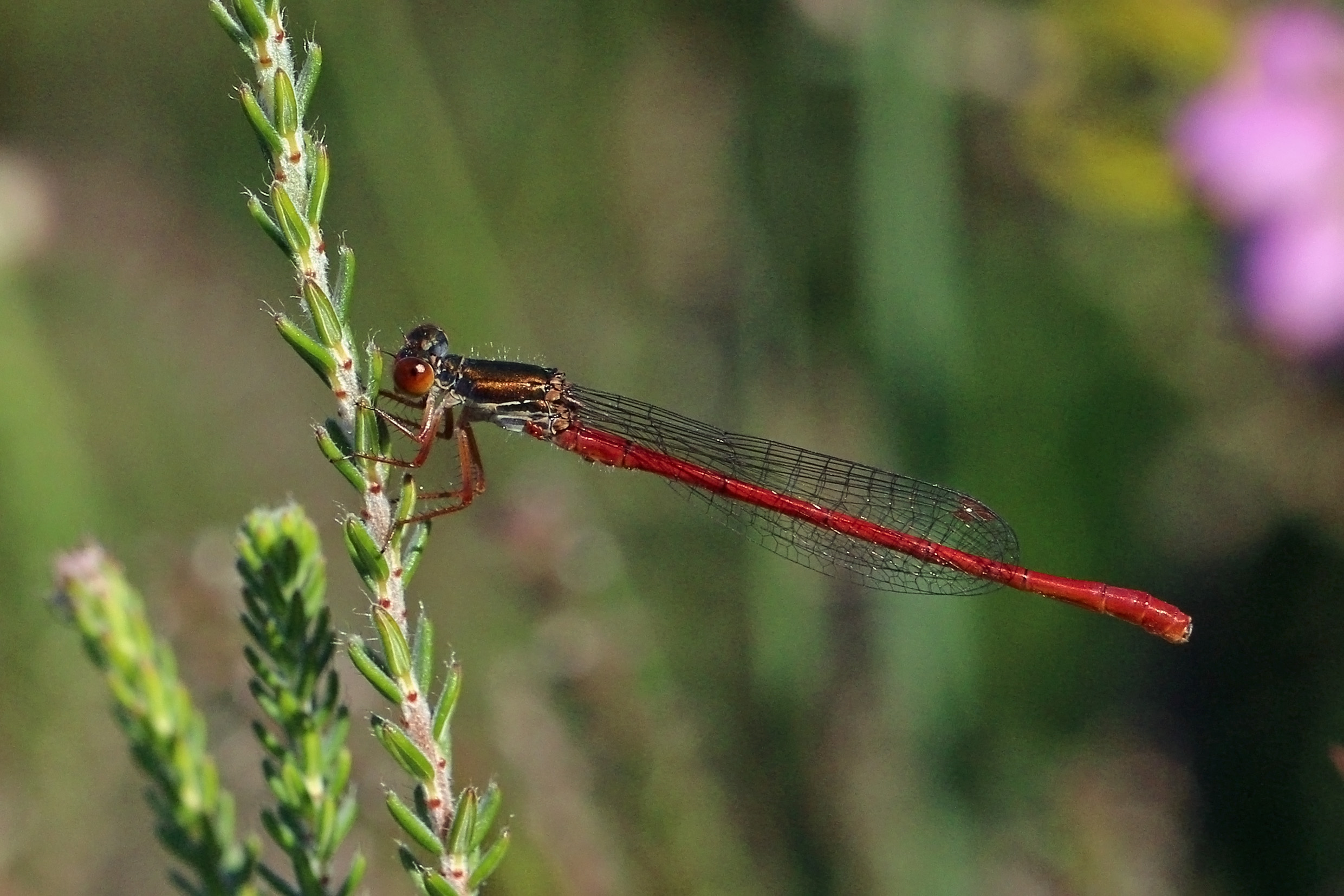
immature male

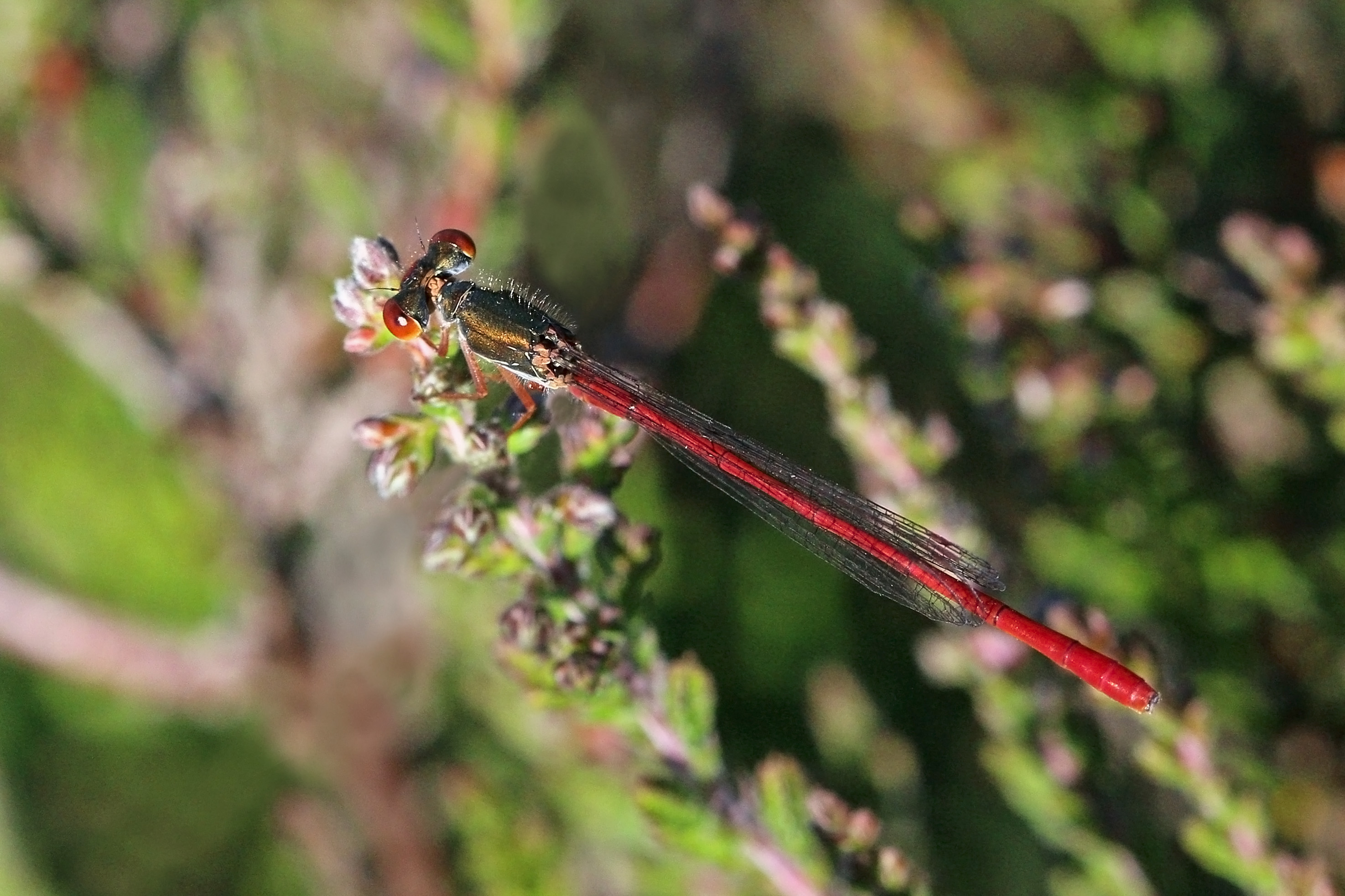
male
dorsal view

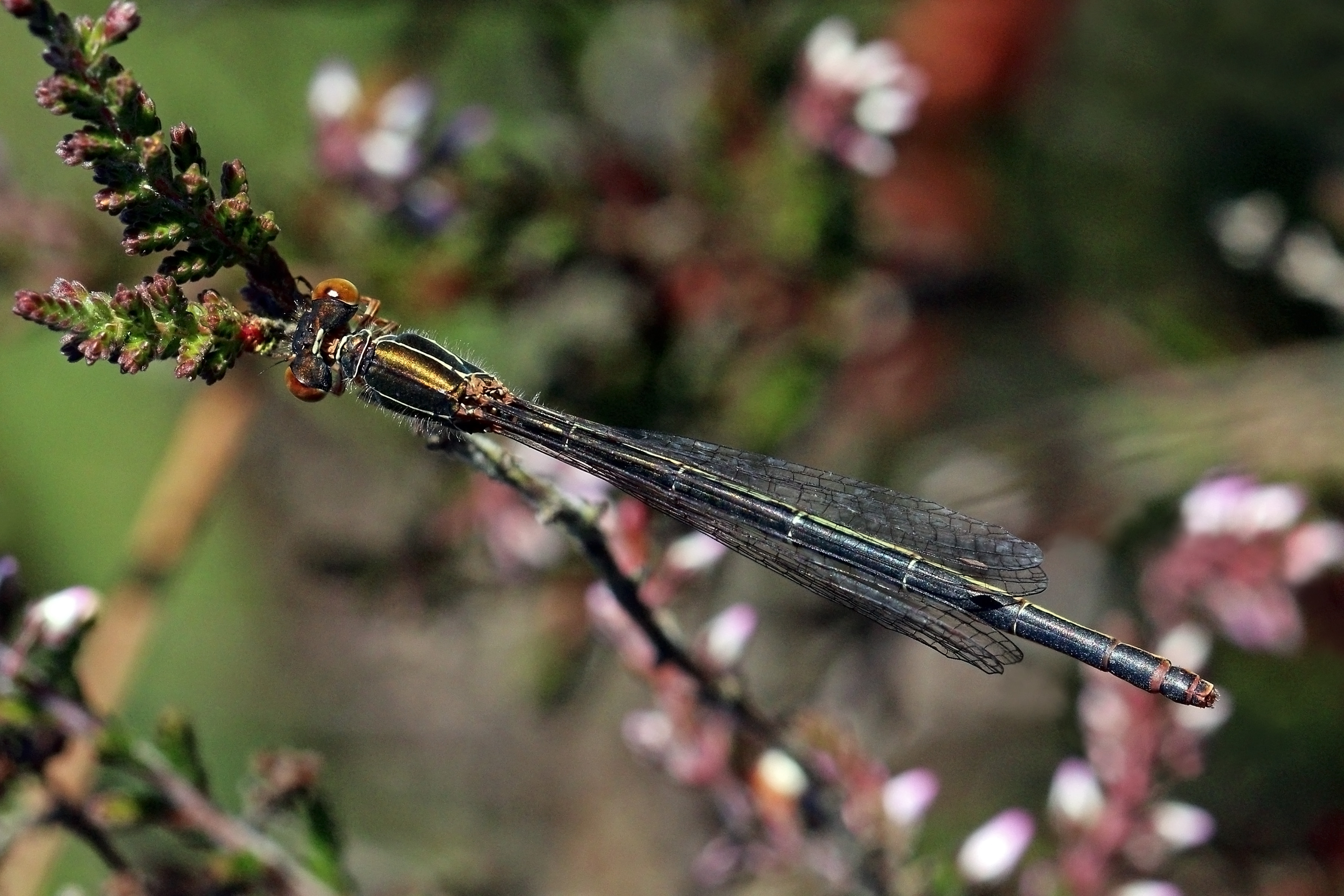
female
form melanogastrum
dorsal view

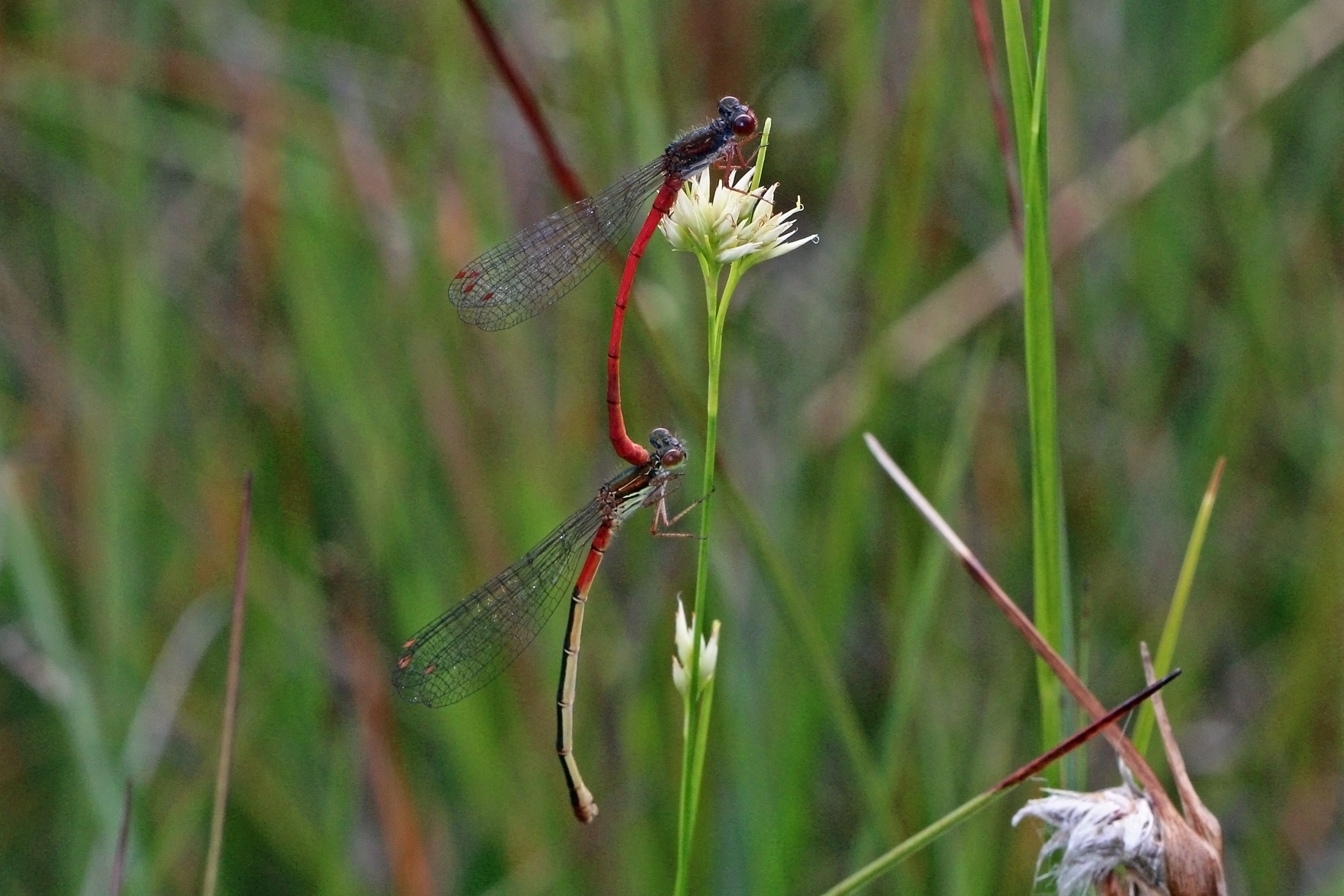
in tandem
female form typica

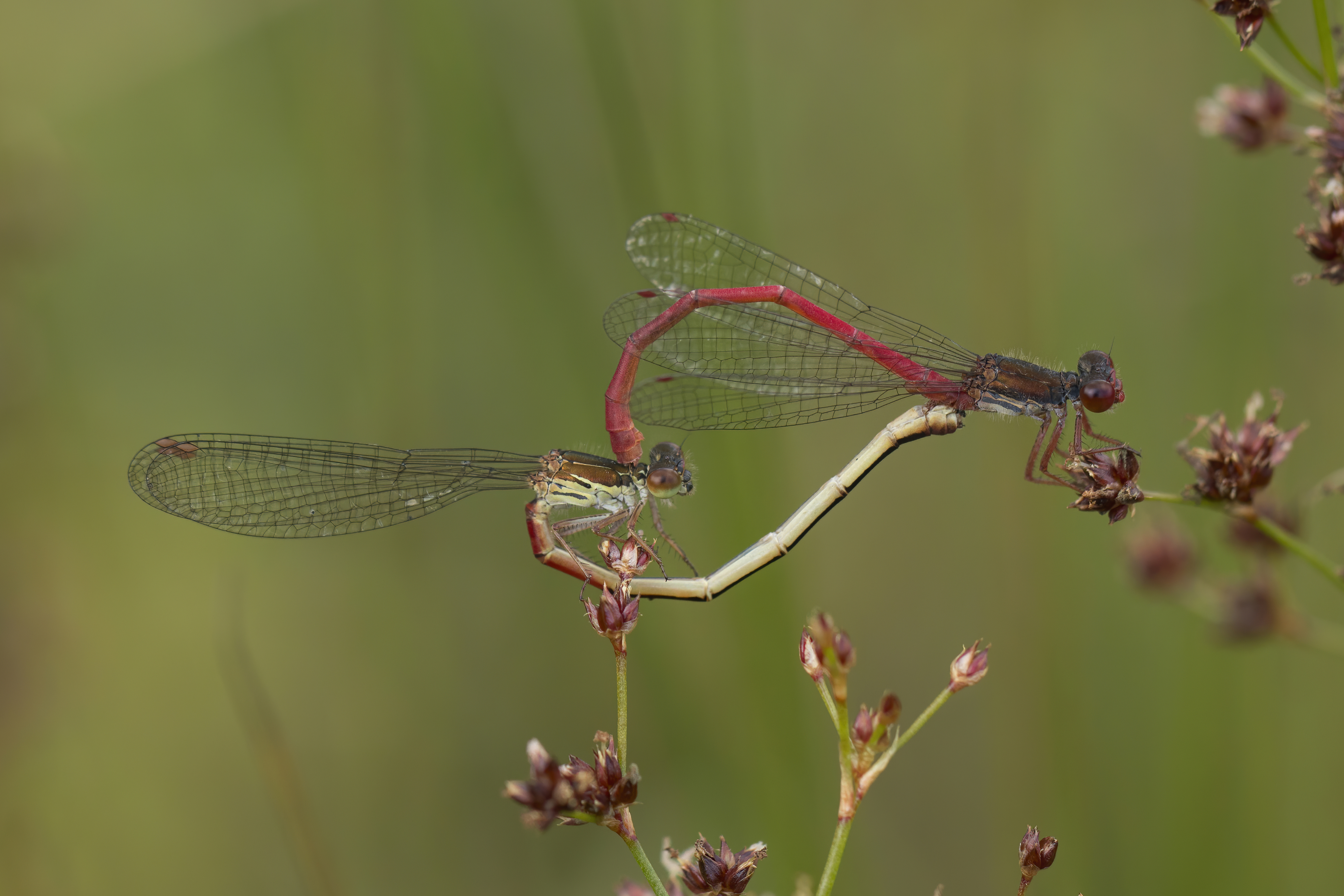
mating
female form typica

== Behaviour ==
Adults fly low and weakly, rarely going far from breeding waters. Like the southern damselfly, which this species sometimes accompanies, they rarely fly in any but the warmest and calmest weather conditions. They can, however, be surprisingly inconspicuous, even the males.

The males are aggressive towards each other but are not territorial. Oviposition takes place in tandem.

== Eggs and larvae ==
It lays elongated eggs in submerged and emergent plants which subsequently hatch after about a month. The larvae are very small, about 16–17 millimetres (0.63–0.67 in), and are found in acidic bogs, streams and ponds. They live among debris in bogs and develop after two years.
