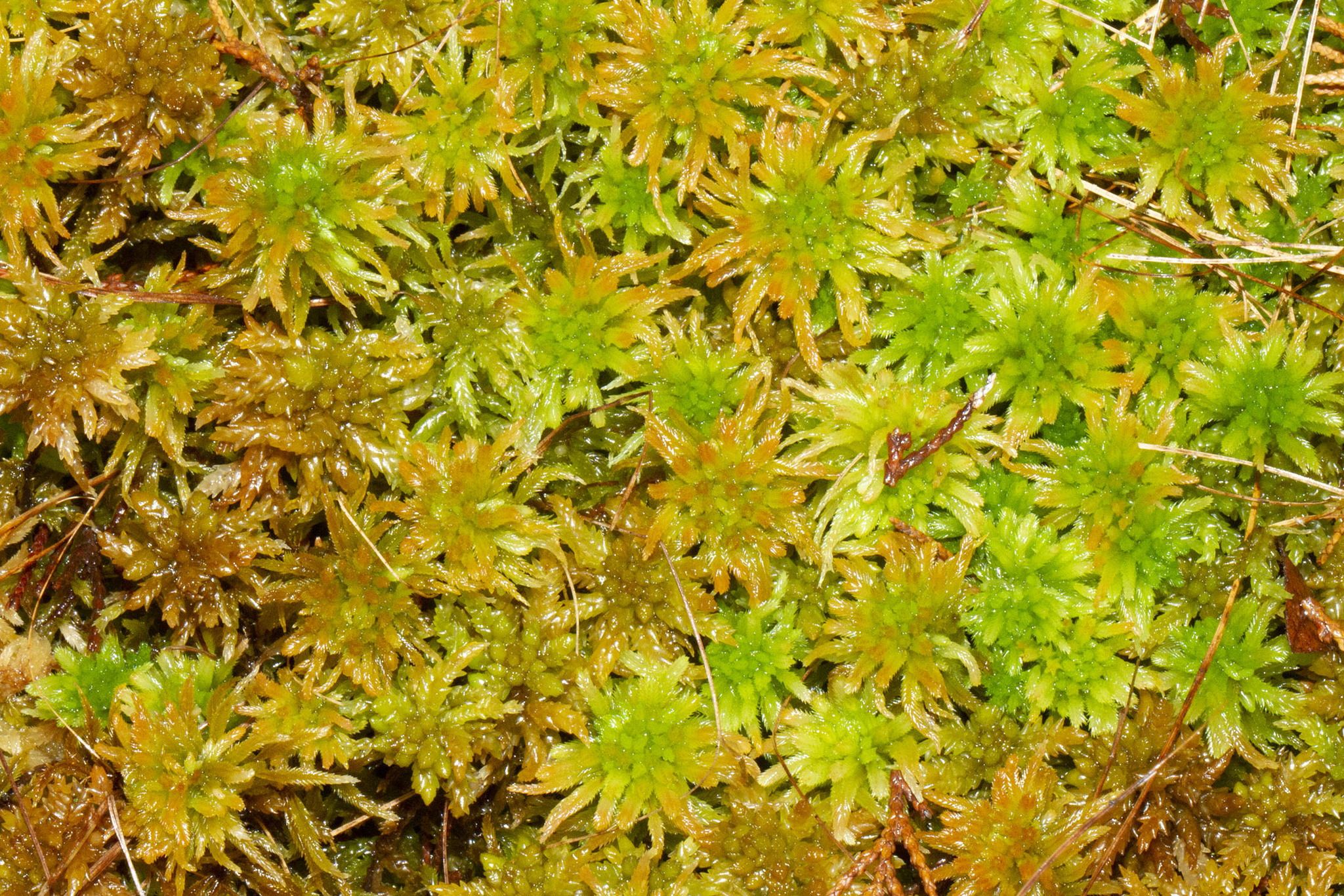

Scientific classification
- Kingdom: Plantae
- Division: Bryophyta
- Class: Sphagnopsida
- Order: Sphagnales
- Family: Sphagnaceae
- Genus: Sphagnum
- Species: S. pulchrum

Binomial name
- Sphagnum pulchrum (Lindb. ex Braithw.) Warnst.

= Sphagnum pulchrum =

Species of moss

Sphagnum pulchrum, the Golden Bog-moss is a species of moss belonging to the family Sphagnaceae.

It has almost cosmopolitan distribution.

== Characteristics ==
This moss species is noted as medium to large in size, formulating as carpets. It can appear as golden orange, yellow-brown, chestnut or green. The branches are predominantly straight and the stem colour is yellow-brown. The stem leaves are triangular in shape, amounting to a distinct point at the tip.

== Habitat ==
Sphagnum pulchrum is known to occur in acidic flushes, pools, hollows, valley mires and bogs. It is most common on the Dorset Heaths.
