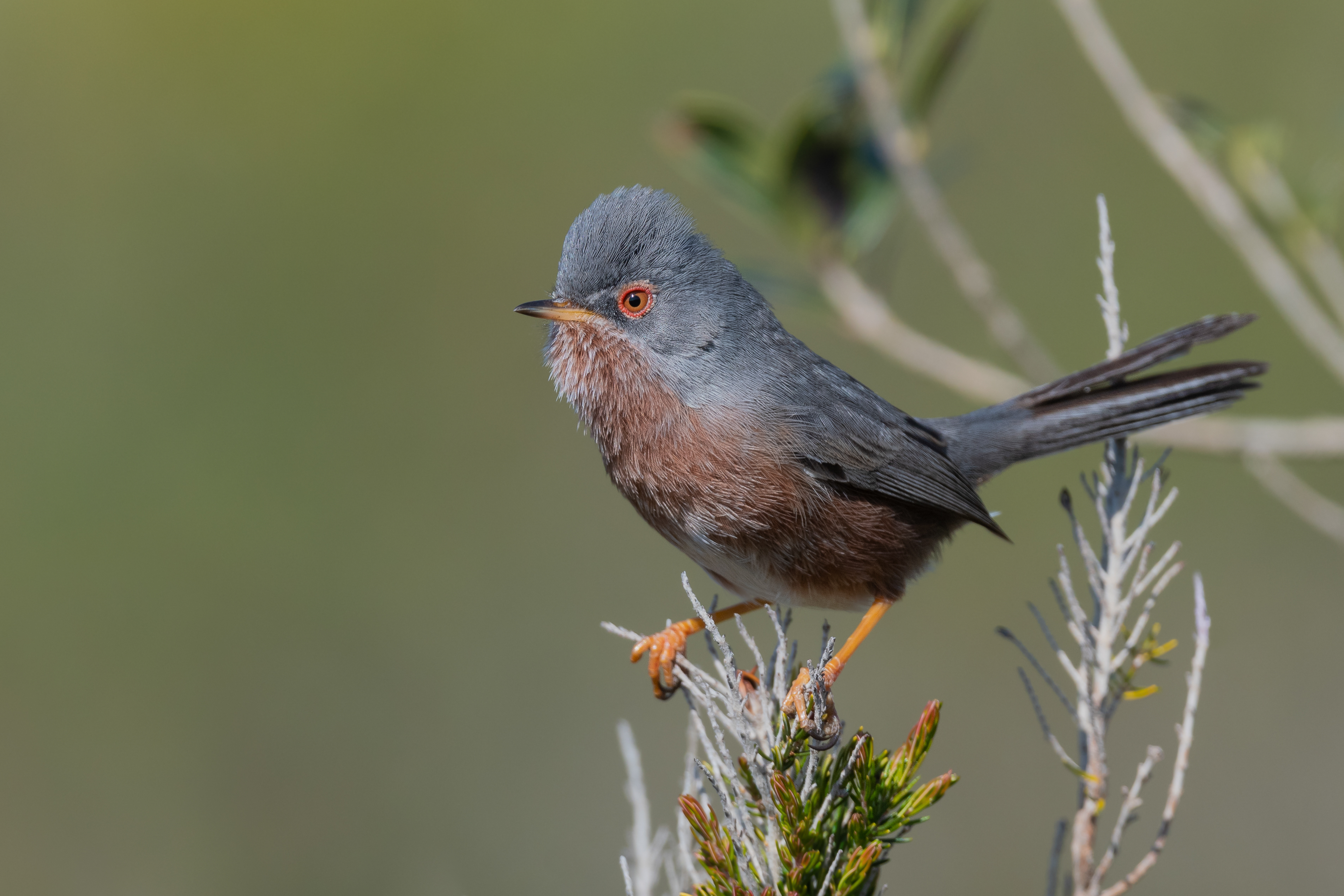
- Male at Ichkeul National Park, Tunisia
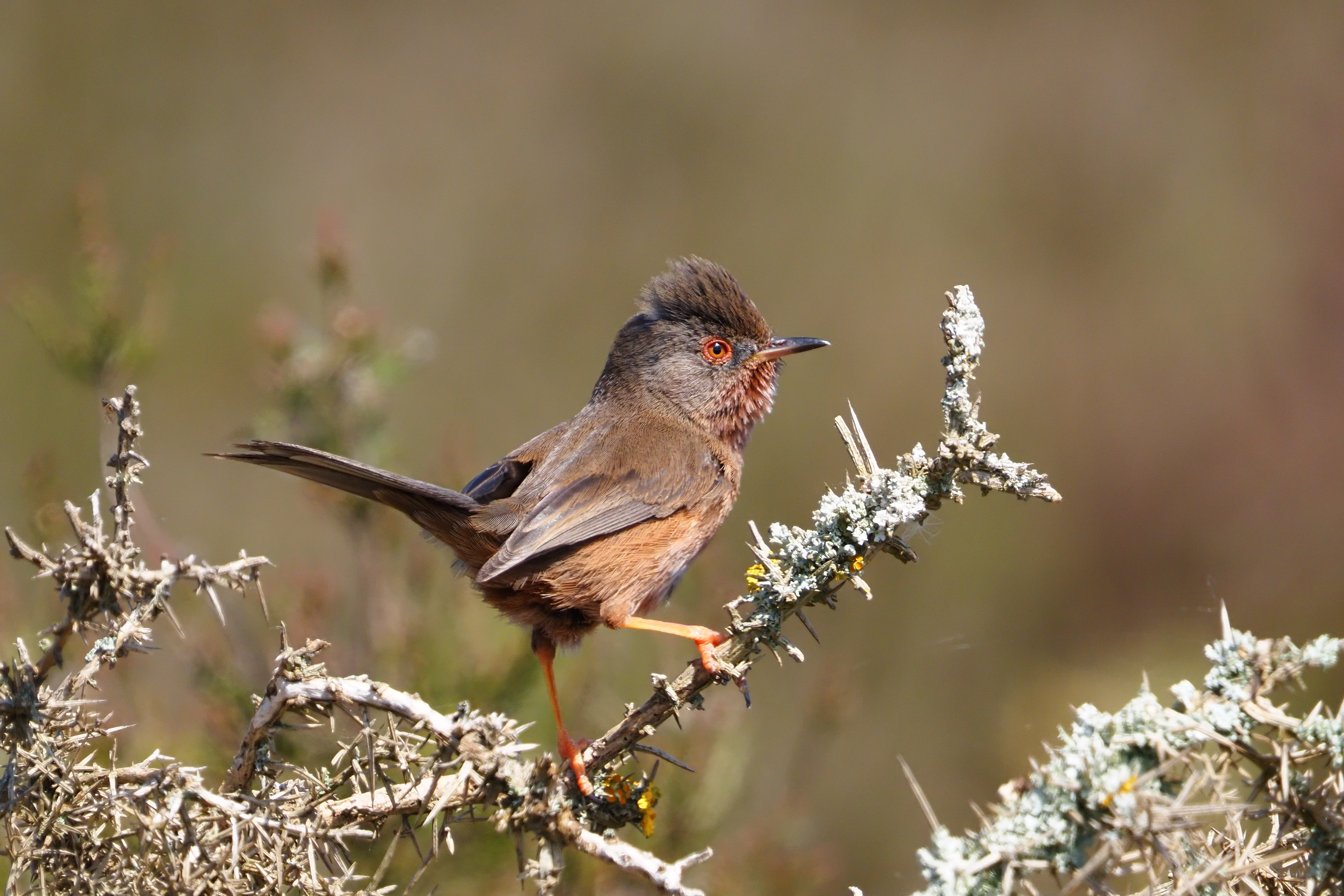
- Female at Thursley, England

Conservation status
- Near Threatened (IUCN 3.1)

Scientific classification
- Kingdom: Animalia
- Phylum: Chordata
- Class: Aves
- Order: Passeriformes
- Family: Sylviidae
- Genus: Curruca
- Species: C. undata

Binomial name
- Curruca undata (Boddaert, 1783)

Synonyms
- Sylvia undata; Sylvia dartfordiensis

= Dartford warbler =

Species of bird

The Dartford warbler (Curruca undata) is a Sylviid warbler from the warmer parts of western Europe and northwestern Africa. It is a small warbler with a long thin tail and a thin pointed bill. The adult male has grey-brown upperparts and is dull reddish-brown below except for the centre of the belly which has a dirty white patch. It has light speckles on the throat and a red eye-ring. The sexes are similar but the adult female is usually less grey above and paler below.

Its breeding range lies west of a line from southern England to the heel of Italy (southern Apulia). The Dartford warbler is usually resident all year in its breeding range, but there is some limited migration.

== Taxonomy and systematics ==
The Dartford warbler was first described in 1776 by the Welsh naturalist, Thomas Pennant. He introduced the English name and based his description on two specimens that had been obtained by the ornithologist John Latham from Bexley Heath, near Dartford in Kent. In 1783 Latham included the warbler in his A General Synopsis of Birds but did not coin the binomial name, Sylvia dartfordiensis, until the supplement to his work was published in 1787. However, in 1783, before the publication of Latham's supplement, the Dutch naturalist Pieter Boddaert introduced the name, Motacilla undata, based on a coloured plate of "Le Pitte-chou, de Provence" in Edmé-Louis Daubenton's Planches enluminées d'histoire naturelle. The specific epithet undata is from Medieval Latin undatus meaning "with wavy markings". The type locality is Provence in France.

This species probably forms a superspecies with Tristram's warbler and this in turn seems close to Marmora's warbler and the Balearic warbler. Altogether, this group of typical warblers bears a resemblance to the wrentit, the only species of Sylviidae from the Americas. However, the wrentit is less closely related to the genus Sylvia than to the parrotbills. Its visual similarity to the Dartford warbler group is an example of convergent evolution.

Three subspecies are recognised:

- C. u. dartfordiensis (Latham, 1787) – south England and north-west France
- C. u. toni (Hartert, 1909) – north-west Africa
- C. u. undata (Boddaert, 1783) – Iberian Peninsula and south France

== Description ==
The Dartford warbler is a small, 13 cm (5.1 in), passerine bird, distinguished by its long tail compared with that of other warblers. Its plumage comprises unobtrusive and muted tones, which blend in with the dry dead plants, old wood or sunny greyish wood found in its preferred habitats.

Like many typical warblers, the Dartford warbler has distinct male and female plumages. The male has a grey back and head, reddish underparts, and a red eye. The reddish throat is spotted with white. The sides are a dull greyish tone, being more clear about the abdomen. In some populations males have bluish-grey or brownish-grey backs and heads. The female is paler below, especially on the throat, and a browner grey above. The female's throat also has white spots, although they are smaller and less marked than in the male. Juvenile birds are similar to females.

== Distribution and habitat ==
The species is naturally rare. The largest European populations of Curruca undata are in the Iberian peninsula, others in much of France, in Italy and southern England and south Wales. In Africa it can be found only in small areas in the north, wintering in northern Morocco and northern Algeria.

== Behaviour and ecology ==
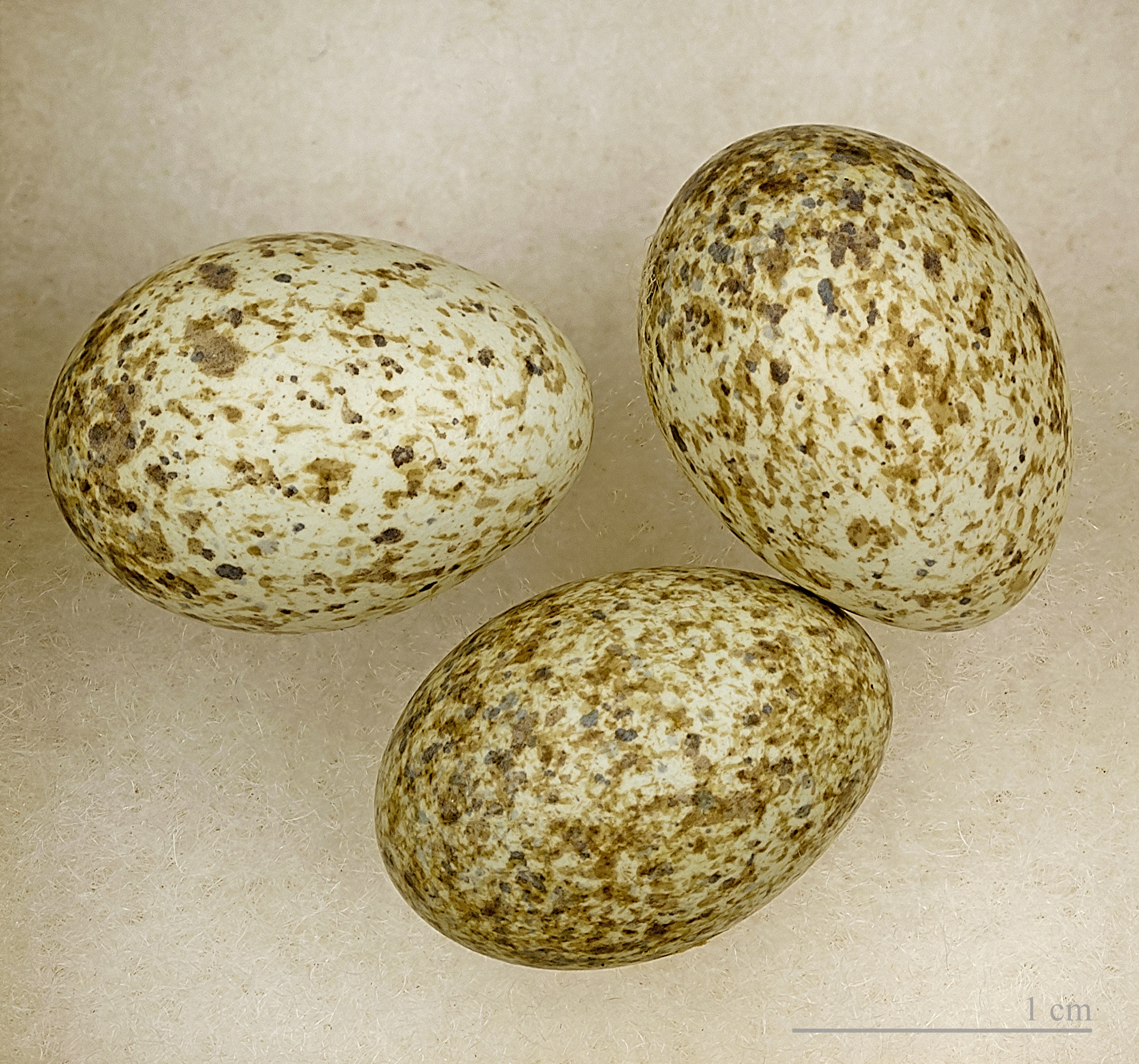
Eggs

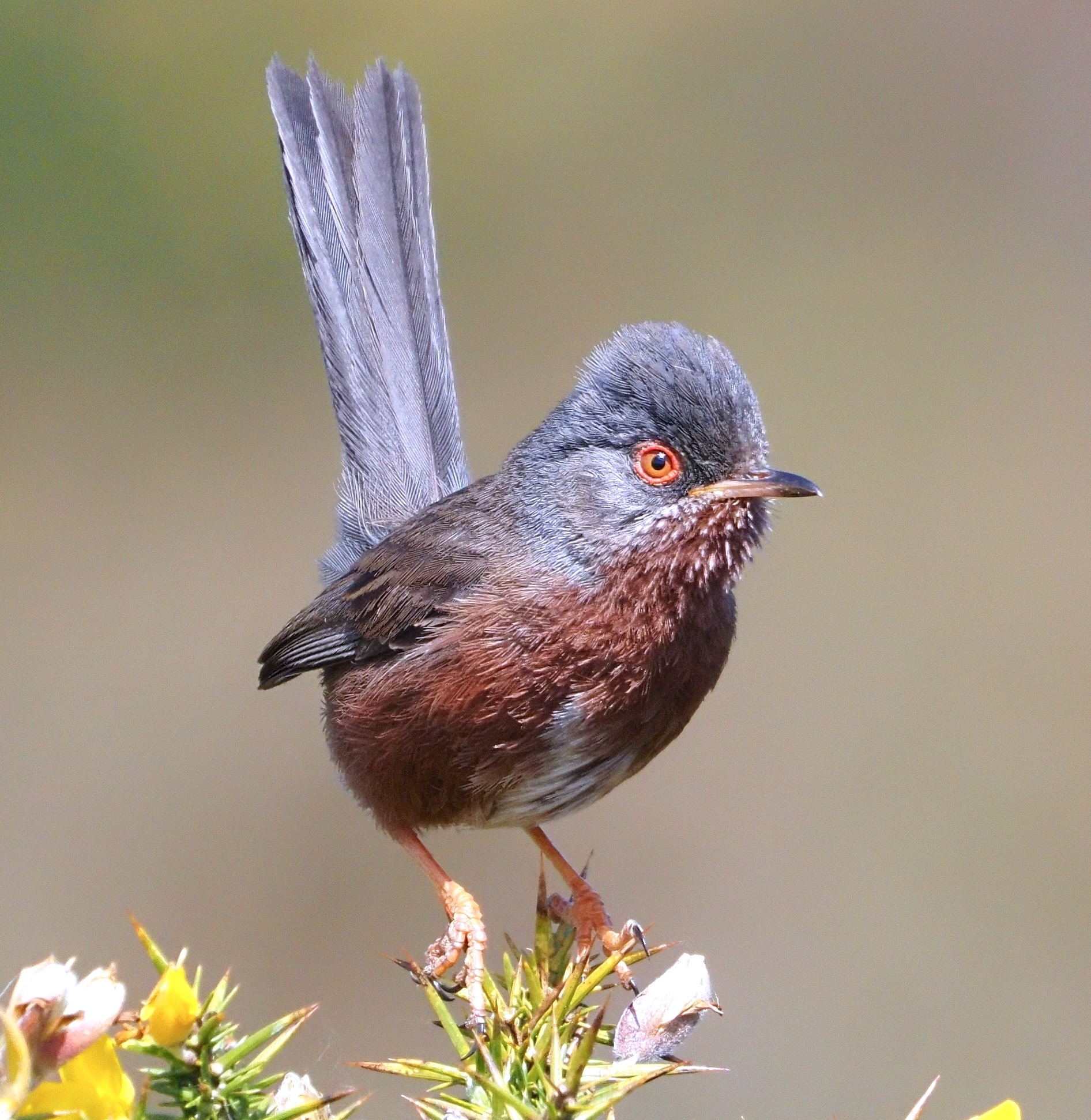
Male at Thursley

=== Breeding ===
Dartford warblers first breed when they are one year old. They are usually monogamous and the pair bond can persist from one year to the next. The male sometimes builds several simple nests (cock nests) of which one is chosen by the female, but it is more usual for both birds to participate in constructing the breeding nest. In southern England the birds breed on heathlands, sometimes near the coast, and nest in either common gorse (Ulex europaeus) or common heather (Calluna vulgaris). The compact cup-shaped nest is located in dense bushes, usually within 60 cm (24 in) of the ground. It is formed mainly of grasses and is lined with a layer of finer material that can include thin roots and feathers. The eggs are laid from early April in southern France and Spain, and from mid-April in southern England. The clutch is typically 3–5 eggs which are smooth and glossy, with a white or occasionally pale green ground and marked with brown speckles which are sometimes concentrated at the larger end. The average size of an egg is 17 mm × 13 mm (0.67 in × 0.51 in) with a weight of 1.4 g (0.049 oz) of which 6 percent is shell. The eggs are incubated for 12–14 days mainly by the female. The chicks are fed arthropods by both parents. The nestlings fledge 10–14 days after hatching and are then fed by their parents for a further two weeks. Usually two and occasionally three broods are raised in a year.

=== Feeding ===
It inhabits open fields with degraded scrub brush and is common in heather. In winter it may visit urban areas, but always feeds within shrubs in these areas. It nests in bushes with thorns and near the ground. These warblers are mostly insectivorous, eating caterpillars, butterflies, beetles and spiders.

The song of the Dartford warbler is a distinctive rattling warble.

== Status and conservation ==
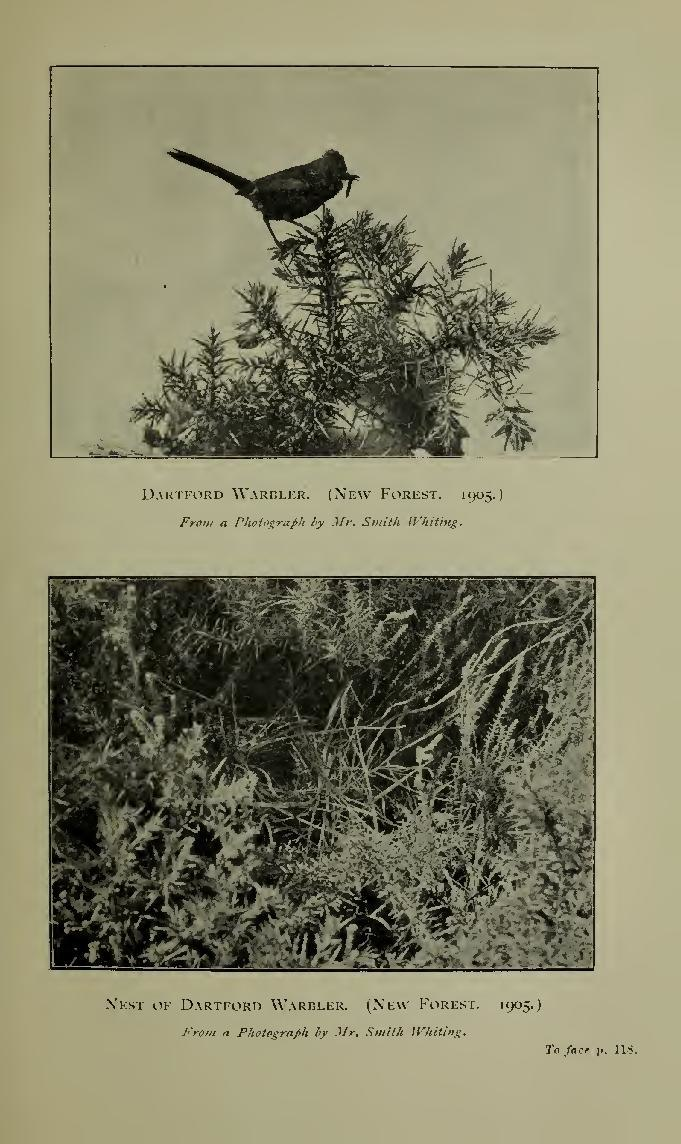
Plate from photographs by Smith Whiting, of an adult bird and a nest in the New Forest, England, from the book The Birds Of Hampshire (1905) by J. E. Kelsall & Philip W. Munn. The authors stated this to be the first photograph of a Dartford warbler in the wild.

Dartford warblers almost died out in the United Kingdom in the severe winter of 1962/1963 when the national population dropped to just ten pairs. Curruca undata is also sensitive to drought affecting breeding success or producing heath fires, as occurred during 1975 and 1976 in England when virtually all juveniles failed to survive their first year.

However, this species can recover well in good quality habitat with favourable temperatures and rainfall, thanks to repeated nesting and a high survival rate for the young. Indeed, they recovered in some areas of the UK, but numbers are once again on the decline in other regions of their natural range.

The range of the Dartford warbler is restricted to western and southern Europe. The total population in 2012 was estimated at 1.1–2.5 million breeding pairs. The largest numbers occur in Spain where there were believed to be 983,000–1,750,000 pairs. For reasons that probably include loss of suitable habitat, the Spanish population appears to be declining. The species is therefore classed by the International Union for Conservation of Nature as being Near Threatened.

A period of climatic warming since 1963 has seen the UK population increase to "more than 2,500 pairs in 2006" (Wotton et al. 2009). Expansion into patches of structurally suitable habitat (up to an altitude of 400m), more northerly areas and away from the core of the range, from Dorset and Hampshire to Derbyshire and Suffolk, is likely to have been facilitated by milder winter weather (Wotton et al. 2009, Bradbury et al. 2011). The Royal Society for the Protection of Birds identified 264 pairs on its nature reserves in 2025. The Dartford warbler population in the UK is expected to continue to increase. However, future climate-based projections for the European range indicate that by 2080, more than 60% of the current European range may no longer be suitable (Huntley et al 2007). There is evidence that this is happening already, with severe declines in Spain and France (Green 2017). For this reason, the species is classified as Near Threatened on the IUCN Global Red List. If the declines in southern Europe continue, the UK will become increasingly important for global conservation of this species".

== Sources ==
- BirdLife International (BLI) (2008): 2008 IUCN Redlist status changes. Retrieved 23 May 2008
- Shirihai, Hadoram; Gargallo, Gabriel; Helbig, Andreas J. (2001). Sylvia Warblers: Identification, taxonomy and phylogeny of the genus Sylvia. London: Christopher Helm. ISBN 978-0-7136-3984-1.
