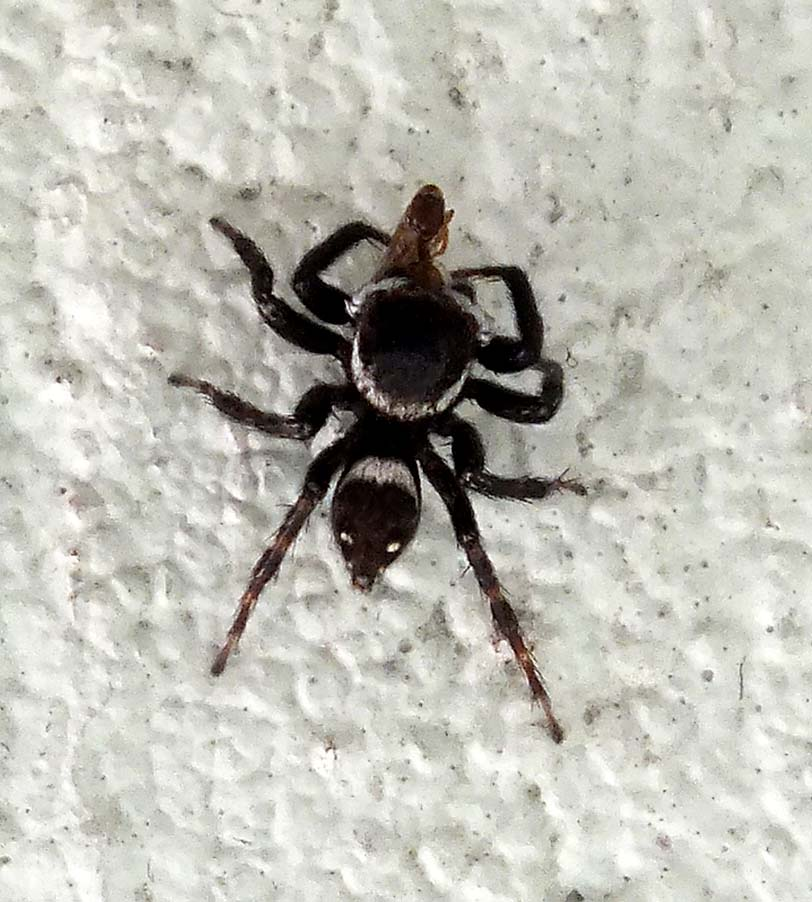
- The related Hasarius adansoni

Scientific classification
- Kingdom: Animalia
- Phylum: Arthropoda
- Subphylum: Chelicerata
- Class: Arachnida
- Order: Araneae
- Infraorder: Araneomorphae
- Family: Salticidae
- Genus: Hasarius
- Species: H. cheliceroides

Binomial name
- Hasarius cheliceroides Borowiec & Wesołowska, 2002

= Hasarius cheliceroides =

Species of spider

Hasarius cheliceroides is a species of jumping spider in the genus Hasarius that lives on Mount Cameroon in Cameroon. The holotype was found at an altitude of 1,425 m (4,675 ft) above sea level. It was first described in 2002 by Ceata Borowiec and Wanda Wesołowska. The spider is medium-sized, with a cephalothorax that measures between 3.3 and 3.5 mm (0.13 and 0.14 in) long and an abdomen that is between 3.9 and 4.2 mm (0.15 and 0.17 in) long. The cephalothorax that is mainly darker brown on top and yellowish on the bottom. The abdomen has yellowish-brown topsides with a brown streak and a large dark patch on the underside. The legs are long and brown, the first pair being longer than the others. However, it is the spider's jaws, or chelicerae, which are its most distinctive characteristic, and the source of its species name. They are large and mount a distinctive fang, which is long with a drooping tip. They also have two teeth to the rear that are mounted on characteristic lobes.

== Taxonomy ==
Hasarius cheliceroides is a species of jumping spider that was first described by Beata Borowiec and Wanda Wesołowska in 2002. Due to its similarity to the type species, Hasarius adansoni, they allocated the spider to the genus Hasarius, first circumscribed in 1871 by Eugène Simon. In 2018, Jerzy Prószyński has subsequently stated that this is a misidentification and that the classification of the species as a member of the genus is suspect. However, he did not revise it so it remained within the genus. The species name relates to the fact that the species has distinctive jaws, or chelicerae, with a large fang.

Wayne Maddison placed the genus Hasarius in the tribe Hasariini in 2015. It is allocated to the subclade Saltafresia in the clade Salticoida. Hasariini had previously been circumscribed by Simon in 1903. Molecular data demonstrate that the genus is closely related to Habrocestum and Chinattus in a group called Hasarieae. Phylogenetic analysis has shown that the genus is related to the genera Neaetha and Salticus. In 2016, Prószyński grouped the genus with 32 other genera of jumping spiders under the name Chrysillines in the supergroup Chrysilloida.

== Description ==
Hasarius spiders are medium-sized spiders. Hasarius cheliceroides is typical for the genus and has a body that is divided into two main parts: an oval cephalothorax and a longer abdomen. The cephalothorax ranges in length between 3.3 and 3.5 mm (0.13 and 0.14 in) and in width between 2.5 and 2.8 mm (0.10 and 0.11 in). The carapace, the hard upper part of the cephalothorax, is generally darker brown than the rest of the spider and covered in brown hairs, with lighter slopes covered in short white hairs. There are lines emanating from the fovea, an indentation in the middle of the carapace. It has a trapezoid eye field with black areas near the eyes themselves. The edges of the cephalothorax are dark brown and the underside of the cephalothorax, or sternum, is yellowish. The spider's face, or clypeus, is narrow and covered in fine white hairs.

The spider's abdomen is longer and narrower than its carapace, measuring between 3.9 and 4.2 mm (0.15 and 0.17 in) in length and typically 2 mm (0.08 in) in width. There are short brown hairs on the front edge. The top is generally yellowish-brown with a wide brown streak down the middle while the sides are yellowish with a covering of white hair. The underside is similar but has a distinctive trapezoid large dark patch on it. The spider has long yellowish brown spinnerets and brown legs. The leg hairs are brown and the long spines dark brown. The legs are long, the front pair even longer that than the others.

The male spider's reproductive system are distinctive. Its pedipalps are light yellow with a very long tibia, which is covered in white hairs. The tibia has a short straight spike, or tibial apophysis, that is tipped with a small tooth-like ending. The spider's cymbium is brown with a covering of short brown hairs while the spider's palpal bulb is an oval that has a short, slightly bent embolus at its end. The female has not been described.

The spider is most easily distinguished from other species by its chelicerae. These are large and dark brown with two teeth at the front margin, one particularly long and prominent, and two small teeth, each mounted on a lobe, at the rear. The way that the teeth are mounted on lobes is characteristic for the species. The remainder of the mouthparts, including the labium and maxilae, are brown with light tips. There is a long fang that has an unusual shape, having a slight bend in the middle and a drooping point.

== Distribution and habitat ==
Hasarius spiders can be found across many warmer countries across Africa and Asia, and have also been observed in greenhouses in cooler climates. Hasarius cheliceroides is endemic to Cameroon. The holotype was found on the south side of Mount Cameroon at an altitude of 1,425 m (4,675 ft) above sea level in 1992. Another example, a paratype, had been found on the same mountain near Buea in 1956 at an altitude of 1,300 m (4,300 ft) above sea level. The spider lives in mist forests
