= Neaetha maxima =

Scientific classification
- Kingdom: Animalia
- Phylum: Arthropoda
- Subphylum: Chelicerata
- Class: Arachnida
- Order: Araneae
- Infraorder: Araneomorphae
- Family: Salticidae
- Genus: Neaetha
- Species: N. maxima

Binomial name
- Neaetha maxima Wesołowska & A. Russell-Smith, 2011

Species of spider

Neaetha maxima is a species of jumping spider in the genus Neaetha that lives in Ivory Coast and Nigeria. It was first described in 2011 by Wanda Wesołowska & Anthony Russell-Smith based on a holotype found near Ibadan. Only the female has been described. The spider is atypically large, over 10 mm (0.39 in) long, which is reflected in the species name. The genus name can be translated new aspect. It has a light brown carapace and yellow-white abdomen, with orange-brown legs. The epigyne has a distinctive central pocket and wide copulatory ducts.

== Taxonomy ==
Neaetha maxima is a species of jumping spider that was first described by Wanda Wesołowska & Anthony Russell-Smith in 2011. It was allocated to the genus Neaetha, which itself had been first raised by Eugène Simon in 1884. The genus is named for two Greek words, néos, which means new, and théa, which can be translated aspect. The species is named for the large size of the spider. Wesołowska and Russell-Smith speculated that the species could be identical to the species Hyllus tuberculatus.

The species in the genus are hard to distinguish, leading to Barbara Patoleta and Marek Żabka suggesting that to understand the relationships between the different species requires the study of genes rather than physical attributes. A DNA analysis study undertaken by Wayne Maddison and Marshall Hedin identified that the genus is most closely related to the genus Salticus. It has also phylogenetic] similarities with Carrhotus and Hasarius, amongst other genera of jumping spiders. The genus was placed in the subtribe Harmochirina in the tribe Plexippini by Maddison in 2015. These were allocated to the clade Saltafresia. The subtribe is divided into harmochirines and pellenines, and the genus is allocated to the latter group, which is characterised by living on open sunny ground. In 2016, Jerzy Prószyński allocated the genus to the Harmochirines group of genera.

== Description ==
Only the female has been described. The spider is large, more than three times larger than other species in the genus like Neaetha catula, with a length over 10 mm (0.39 in). Its cephalothorax is 4.8 mm (0.19 in) long and 3.9 mm (0.15 in) wide, while its abdomen is 5.6 mm (0.22 in) long and 3.5 mm (0.14 in) wide. It has a light brown rhomboid carapace with a high cephalon, with half taken up with a darker eye field. Scattered white hairs line the edge of the carapace. The ovoid abdomen is narrower and lighter, yellow-white in colour with a faint grey chevron pattern visible. The clypeus and chelicerae are brown. The spinnerets are grey and the legs are orange-brown. The epigyne has a distinctive central pocket and wide copulatory ducts.

== Distribution and habitat ==
Neaetha irreperta lives in Ivory Coast and Nigeria. The holotype for the species was found on a river bank near Ibadan in Nigeria in 2011, based on a specimen found in 1974. The species distribution was extended to include Ivory Coast in 2022, based on examples found near the Bandama River in 1975.
