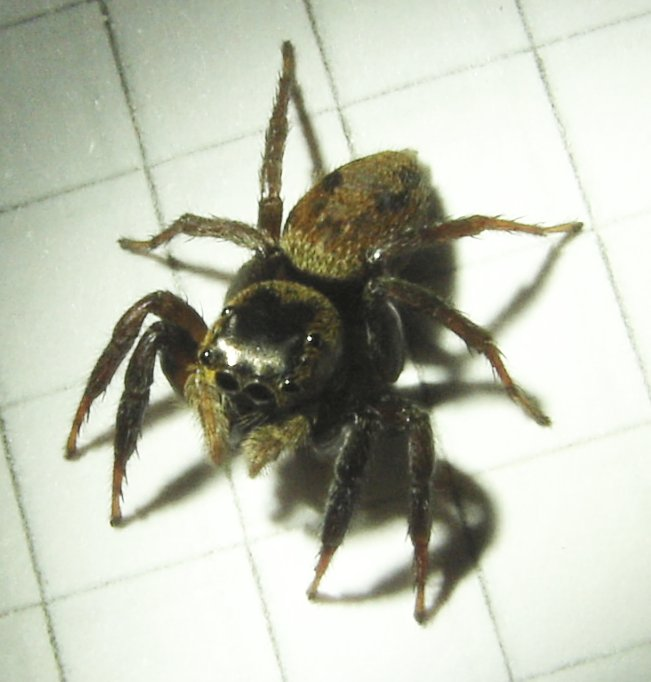
- The related Hasarius adansoni

Scientific classification
- Kingdom: Animalia
- Phylum: Arthropoda
- Subphylum: Chelicerata
- Class: Arachnida
- Order: Araneae
- Infraorder: Araneomorphae
- Family: Salticidae
- Genus: Hasarius
- Species: H. insularis

Binomial name
- Hasarius insularis Wesołowska & van Harten, 2002

= Hasarius insularis =

Species of spider

Hasarius insularis is a species of jumping spider in the genus Hasarius that lives on Socotra Island, Yemen. It was first described in 2002 by Wanda Wesołowska and Antonius van Harten. The spider is medium-sized, with a carapace that measures typically 4.5 mm (0.18 in) in length and an abdomen that is typically 5.9 mm (0.23 in) long. It has a cephalothorax that is mainly reddish-brown on top and yellowish on the bottom. The abdomen has dark topsides with a yellowish pattern and dark dots and patches underneath. It has copulatory organs that are similar to other species in the genus. The insemination ducts are relatively short and the spermathecae spherical, but they are both thicker than those found in other examples. The spider's name recalls a Latin word that means "insular".

== Taxonomy ==
Hasarius insularis is a species of jumping spider that was first described by Wanda Wesołowska and Antonius van Harten in 2002. They allocated the spider to the genus Hasarius. The genus Hasarius was first circumscribed in 1871 by Eugène Simon. As only the female has been described, this classification may not be final. The species is named after the Latin word for "insular".

Wayne Maddison placed the genus Hasarius in the tribe Hasariini in 2015. It is allocated to the subclade Saltafresia in the clade Salticoida. Hasariini had previously been circumscribed by Simon in 1903. Molecular data demonstrates that the genus is closely related to Habrocestum and Chinattus in a group called Hasarieae. Phylogenetic analysis has shown that the genus is related to the genera Neaetha and Salticus. In 2016, Jerzy Prószyński grouped the genus with 32 other genera of jumping spiders under the name Chrysillines in the supergroup Chrysilloida.

== Description ==
Hasarius spiders are medium-sized spiders. The spider's body is divided into two main parts: the cephalothorax and the abdomen. Hasarius insularis has a carapace, the hard upper part of the cephalothorax, that is typically 4.5 mm (0.18 in) long and 3.5 mm (0.14 in) wide. The carapace is rather high and is reddish-brown on top with a lighter brown area to the middle. It is covered in very short grey and brown hairs. The eye field is short and darker, with long bristles near the eyes themselves. The sternum, the underside of the cephalothorax, is yellowish. The mouthparts consist of dark brown chelicerae and lighter brown labium and maxilae that have pale tips. The spider has two teeth to the front and another bicuspid tooth to the rear.

The spider's abdomen is larger than its carapace, typically measuring 5.9 mm (0.23 in) in length and 3.9 mm (0.15 in) in width. The top is dark brown with an unusual yellowish pattern, clothed in brown and greyish hairs. The bottom is covered with dark dots and small patches. The spider's spinnerets are yellow. It has yellowish-brown legs, with brown leg hairs and spines, apart from the joints between segments, which are marked by dark rings.

The main determining feature for the species is its reproductive system. The epigyne has a notch at its rearmost edge and two rounded openings. The insemination ducts are relatively short, with narrow at their entrances and a wider section deeper in, and lead to spherical spermathecae. The walls of the spermathecae and insemination ducts are particularly thick, which distinguishes the spider from others in the genus. Otherwise, their shape is similar to the related Hasarius adansoni. The male has not been described.

== Distribution ==
Hasarius spiders can be found across many warmer countries across Africa and Asia, and have also been observed in greenhouses in cooler climates. Hasarius insularis is endemic to Yemen. The holotype was found near Mahfirhin on Socotra Island in 1999. Its island habitat is reflected in its specific name. It has not been found in other areas of the country.
