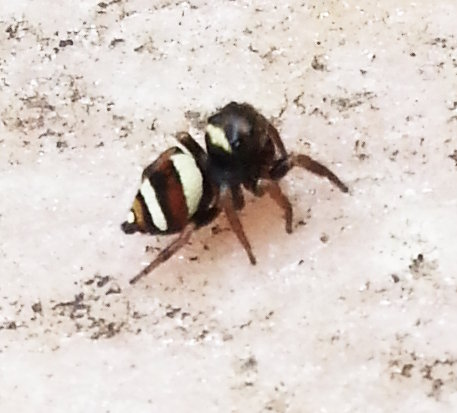
- Female in Hong Kong

Scientific classification
- Kingdom: Animalia
- Phylum: Arthropoda
- Subphylum: Chelicerata
- Class: Arachnida
- Order: Araneae
- Infraorder: Araneomorphae
- Family: Salticidae
- Genus: Ptocasius
- Species: P. strupifer

Binomial name
- Ptocasius strupifer Simon, 1901

= Ptocasius strupifer =

Species of spider

Ptocasius strupifer is a species of jumping spider in the family Salticidae. It was first described by Eugène Simon in 1901. It is the most commonly found species of the genus Ptocasius.

The etymology of the species name is unclear. Simon used the same word in his earlier description of what is now Araneus strupifer.

== Description ==
=== Male ===
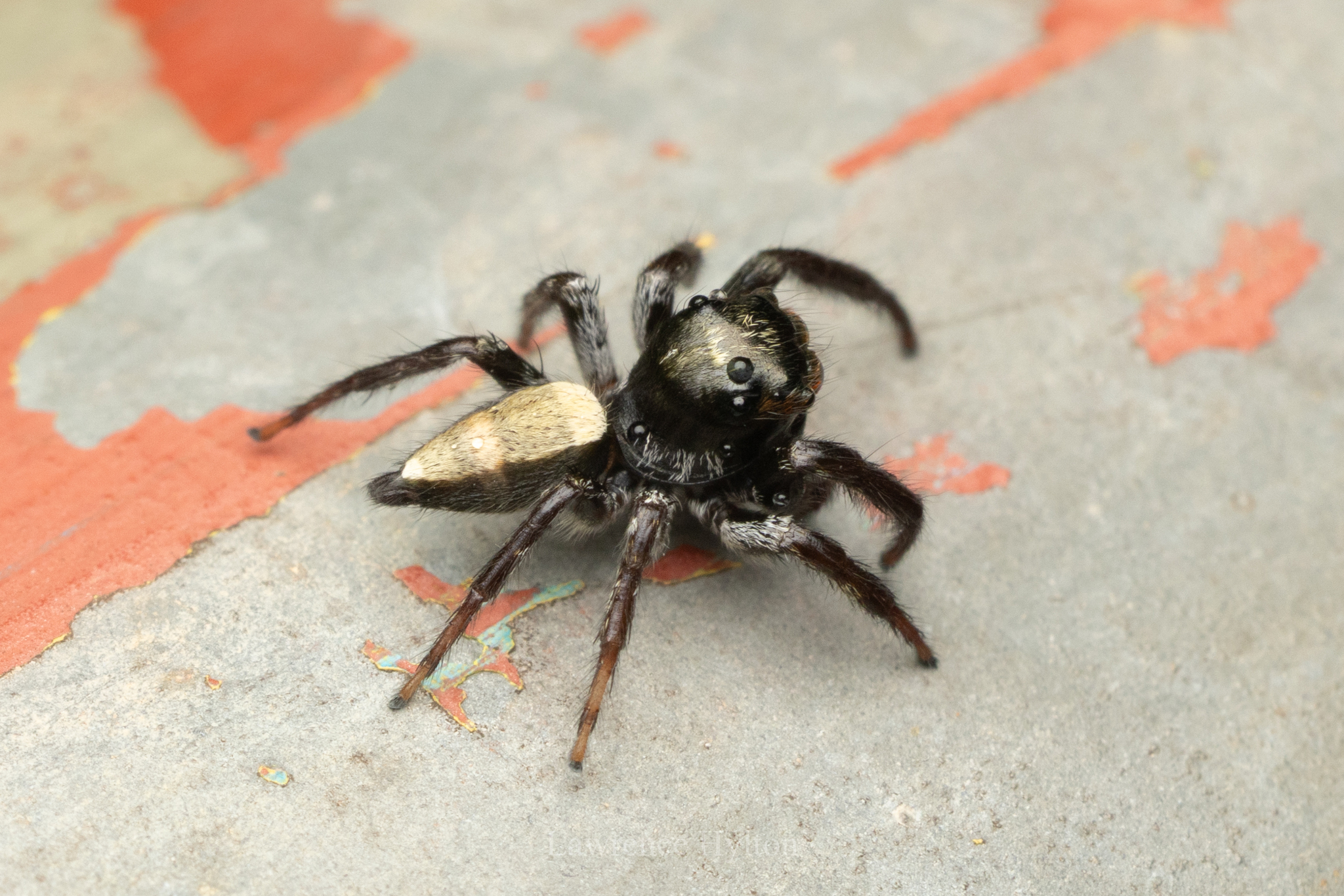
male in Hong Kong

The holotype described by Simon is a male measuring 6 millimeters in body length. The cephalothorax is robust and convex, black and shiny with almost completely bare integument, except for a median longitudinal white-haired marking on the thoracic portion. The eye hairs are short, appearing above and between the eyes as scarlet and beneath as white. The clypeus is twice as narrow as the median eyes, nearly smooth, with a few thin ashy hairs at the margin.

The abdomen is elongated and black above, with a very broad complete pale band that is somewhat diluted and white-haired in ornamentation, and black beneath with some white hair. The chelicerae are robust and convex, black and shiny, lightly striated transversely. The oral parts and sternum are black and shiny.

The front legs are dark brown-chestnut with black femora and yellow tarsi, while the posterior legs are more diluted but with dark brown femora and yellow metatarsi and tarsi. The anterior tibiae and metatarsi are densely hairy beneath but not fringed. The anterior metatarsi have 2-2 spines beneath and small spines on both sides, the metatarsi of the third pair have two spines beneath, and the metatarsi of the fourth pair have three spines beneath.

More detailed descriptions from Vietnamese specimens show males with a dark brown cephalothorax, with surroundings of the median eyes black. Near the fovea, posteriorly and laterally, are tufts of adpressed white setae. The eye field measures 1.41 mm in length and 2.10-2.19 mm in width. The abdomen displays transverse grey-brown and orange streaks, with numerous grey-brown hairs on dark surfaces and bristles of similar coloration. The palpal bulb is orange-brown with a relatively short embolus. Legs are dark brown with a greyish tinge, with basal and distal segments lighter brown.

=== Female ===
The female was first described by Żabka in 1985 from Vietnamese specimens. Females are smaller than males, with a cephalothorax length of 2.50 mm and abdomen length of 2.30 mm. The cephalothorax is dark brown with darker surroundings around the eyes, covered in small dark brown hairs that are denser posteriorly. Dark brown bristles are present around the eyes. The eye field measures 1.11 mm in length and 1.80 mm in width.

The abdomen is grey-brown with transverse pearly-white streaks anteriorly and medially, and a pale terminal patch. It is covered with numerous grey-brown hairs on dark surfaces, along with grey and light grey hairs and grey-brown bristles. The clypeus is dark orange with sparse grey-orange hairs, and three light brown bristles are present beneath the median anterior eyes. The chelicerae are dark orange, while the pedipalps are paler. The sternum is grey-orange, and the venter is beige with grey longitudinal streaks that converge near the spinnerets.

The epigyne features characteristic pockets with vast copulatory openings and strongly sclerotized internal canals forming several loops. The legs are grey-brown with a slight orange tinge, though the femora are darker.

== Distribution ==
Ptocasius strupifer is found from China to Thailand. The species has also been recorded from Rajasthan, India, representing the first record of the species from the Indian subcontinent.

== Ecology ==
Due to its relatively small size compared to other jumping spiders such as Plexippus paykulli and Hasarius adansoni, P. strupifer may serve as prey for larger salticid species. Research has documented predation pressure from H. adansoni and metabolic responses to predation risk in small jumping spiders including P. strupifer.
