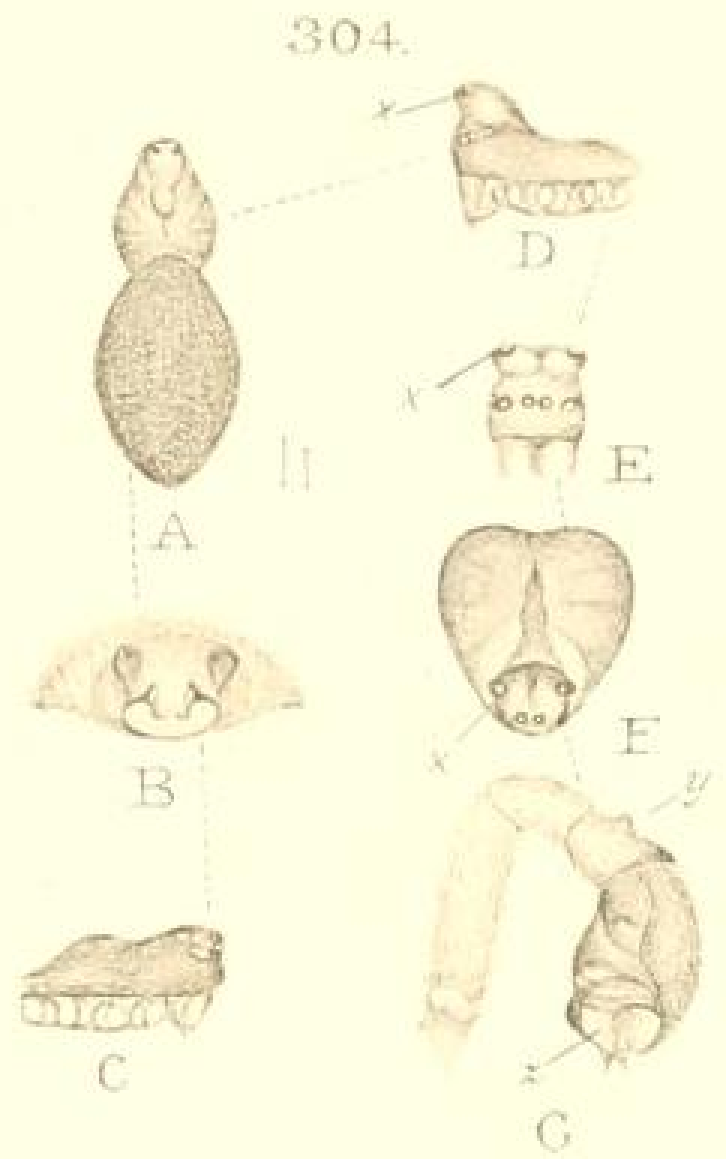
- Diagnostic drawings from Bösenberg (1902)

Scientific classification
- Kingdom: Animalia
- Phylum: Arthropoda
- Subphylum: Chelicerata
- Class: Arachnida
- Order: Araneae
- Infraorder: Araneomorphae
- Family: Linyphiidae
- Genus: Abacoproeces
- Species: A. saltuum

Binomial name
- Abacoproeces saltuum (L. Koch, 1872)

Synonyms
- Erigone saltuensis O. Pickard-Cambridge, 1873; Metopobactrus brunneipes F. Dahl, 1912

= Abacoproeces saltuum =

Species of spider

Abacoproeces saltuum is a small spider species belonging to the family Linyphiidae (sheet weaver spiders).

== Taxonomy ==
The species was first described by Ludwig Koch in 1872 as Erigone saltuum. It was subsequently redescribed by Octavius Pickard-Cambridge in 1873 as Erigone saltuensis, before being transferred to the genus Ptocasius and finally to its current placement in Abacoproeces by Eugène Simon in 1884. The species Metopobactrus brunneipes described by Friedrich Dahl in 1912 was later synonymised with A. saltuum by Konrad Thaler in 1976.

== Distribution ==
A. saltuum is distributed across Europe from the British Isles to South Siberia. It has been recorded from numerous European countries including Germany, Austria, Belgium, Norway, Finland, Sweden, Czech Republic, Bulgaria, and Russia. The species was first reported from Belgium as recently as 2015.

== Description ==
Abacoproeces saltuum is a small linyphiid spider with notable sexual dimorphism. Males are considerably smaller than females, measuring approximately 1.7 mm in length, while females reach about 2.1 mm.

The cephalothorax is dark brown mixed with blackish coloration and tinged with yellow, with the upper part of the cephalic region being paler than the rest. The clypeus is nearly perpendicular and its height is nearly two-thirds that of the face. The chelicerae, pedipalps, and labium are yellow-brown, while the sternum is suffused with black.

The opisthosoma is oval and moderately convex above, sparsely clothed with hairs. Its coloration is black, mottled with pale whitish markings, and features some transverse angular lines on the posterior part of the upper side. Near the center is a rectangular pattern formed by four depressed dots.

In males, the palpal organs are complex, featuring a curved process at their base near the extremity on the outer side of the radial joint, and a short, prominent, tapering black spine that curves in a somewhat circular form at their outer extremity.

Females are notably larger than males and have a distinctly elevated caput, though not to as great an extent as in males. The lateral pairs of eyes in females are also wider apart in comparison to the posterior pair than in males. The form of the genital aperture is distinctively characteristic of the species.
