= Neaetha irreperta =

Scientific classification
- Kingdom: Animalia
- Phylum: Arthropoda
- Subphylum: Chelicerata
- Class: Arachnida
- Order: Araneae
- Infraorder: Araneomorphae
- Family: Salticidae
- Genus: Neaetha
- Species: N. irreperta

Binomial name
- Neaetha irreperta Wesołowska & Russell-Smith, 2000

Species of spider

Neaetha irreperta is a species of jumping spider in the genus Neaetha that lives in South Africa and Tanzania. First described in 2000 by Wanda Wesołowska & Anthony Russell-Smith, the spider is small, with a dark brown carapace that is between 1.2 and 1.4 mm (0.047 and 0.055 in) long and a deep red-brown abdomen between 1.1 and 1.5 mm (0.043 and 0.059 in) long. The abdomen has a pattern that is indistinct on the male, but a clearer set of grey lines and marks on the female, and this, along with the width of the abdomen, distinguishes the species from other in the genus. The male has a long embolus and the female's sclerotized epigyne has a central pocket and wide copulatory openings.

== Taxonomy ==
Neaetha irreperta is a species of jumping spider that was first described by Wanda Wesołowska & Anthony Russell-Smith in 2000. It was allocated to the genus Neaetha, which itself had been first raised by Eugène Simon in 1884. The genus is named for two Greek words, néos, which means new, and théa, which can be translated aspect. The species is named for a Latin word than can be translated recondite. It was listed as one only two valid species in the genus from Africa by Dmitri Logunov in 2009.

The species in the genus are hard to distinguish, leading to Barbara Patoleta and Marek Żabka suggesting that to understand the relationships between the different species requires the study of genes rather than physical attributes. A DNA analysis study undertaken by Wayne Maddison and Marshall Hedin identified that the genus is most closely related to the genus Salticus. It has also phylogenetic similarities with Carrhotus and Hasarius, amongst other genera of jumping spiders. The genus was placed in the subtribe Harmochirina in the tribe Plexippini by Maddison in 2015. These were allocated to the clade Saltafresia. The subtribe is divided into harmochirines and pellenines, and the genus is allocated to the latter group, which is characterised by living on open sunny ground. In 2016, Jerzy Prószyński allocated the genus to the Harmochirines group of genera.

== Description ==
The spider is small. The male has a brown carapace that is 1.2 mm (0.047 in) long and 1.1 mm (0.043 in) wide, broad and quick high, particularly to the rear. It is very hairy, with brown bristles along the back eye field and light grey hairs covering the remainder. The rounded abdomen is between 1.1 and 1.2 mm (0.043 and 0.047 in) long and 0.9 to 1.1 mm (0.035 to 0.043 in) wide and is a deep red-brown with grey and brown hairs. An indistinct yellow-grey pattern is just about visible. The clypeus is low and the chelicerae dark brown, with one forward and two rear teeth. The rearmost spinnerets are lighter than the ones towards the front. The legs are stripy. The palpal bulb is brown and rounded with a long embolus.

The female is slightly larger than the male, but has similar colouration. The carapace measures between 1.3 and 1.4 mm (0.051 and 0.055 in) long and 1.3 mm (0.051 in) wide while the abdomen is 1.5 mm (0.059 in) long and 1.3 mm (0.051 in) wide. The carapace has a thin black line along its edges and there are white scales on the eye field. The pattern on the abdomen is clearer, with the grey lines and marks easier to distinguish. It is covered with white and black hairs. The pedipalps are yellow. The epigyne is sclerotized and has a central pocket. The wide copulatory openings lead to broad and curved seminal ducts and oval spermathecae. The females of the genus are generally hard to tell apart. However, the colouration and width of the abdomen is distinctive, particularly compared to the otherwise similar Neaetha oculata.

== Distribution and habitat ==
Neaetha irreperta lives in South Africa and Tanzania. The male holotype was found in the Mkomazi National Park in 1994. It was subsequently observed in South Africa, initially in the Jubaweni Game Reserve in Limpopo, and then in the Ndumo Game Reserve in KwaZulu-Natal. It lives in savannah.
