= Neaetha wesolowskae =

Scientific classification
- Kingdom: Animalia
- Phylum: Arthropoda
- Subphylum: Chelicerata
- Class: Arachnida
- Order: Araneae
- Infraorder: Araneomorphae
- Family: Salticidae
- Genus: Neaetha
- Species: N. wesolowskae

Binomial name
- Neaetha wesolowskae Patoleta & Żabka, 2020

Species of jumping spider

Neaetha wesolowskae is a species of jumping spider that is endemic to Thailand. The member of the genus Neaetha that has been found most easterly, it lives in rainforests. First described in 2020 by Barbara Patoleta & Marek Żabka, the spider is named for the Polish arachnologist Wanda Wesołowska. It is small with a brown forward section, its carapace, that is between 0.86 and 1.49 mm (0.034 and 0.059 in) in length and, behind that, an abdomen that is between 0.97 and 1.2 mm (0.038 and 0.047 in) long. The female is smaller than the male and has a pattern of spots rather than lines on its abdomen. The female is hard to tell from other members of the genus but can be differentiated by its copulatory organs. Its epigyne has ovoid, rather than crescent-shaped, copulatory openings and spermathecae that are separated rather than lying together. The male has an embolus that is unusually crescent-shaped.

== Taxonomy and etymology ==
Neaetha wesolowskae is a species of jumping spider, a member of the family Salticidae, that was first described by the Polish arachnologists Barbara Patoleta and Marek Żabka in 2020. It was allocated to the genus Neaetha, which itself had been first circumscribed by Eugène Simon in 1884. The genus is named for two Greek words, néos, which means new, and théa, which can be translated as aspect. The species is named for the Polish arachnologist Wanda Wesołowska. The holotype is stored in the Zoological Museum of Uppsala University.

The species is hard to distinguish from others in the genus, leading to Patoleta and Żabka suggesting that understanding the relationships between the different species will require study of the genes rather than their physical attributes. This confusion spreads to the genus, as Neaetha spiders are externally similar to other genera, including Bianor, Harmochirus. However, subsequent study has proved that they are only distantly related. A DNA analysis study undertaken by Wayne Maddison and Marshall Hedin identified that the genus is most closely related to the genus Salticus. It has also phylogenetic similarities with Carrhotus and Hasarius, amongst other genera of jumping spiders. The genus was placed in the subtribe Harmochirina in the tribe Plexippini by Maddison in 2015. These were allocated to the clade Saltafresia. The subtribe is divided into harmochirines and pellenines, and the genus is allocated to the latter group, which is characterised by living on the open sunny ground.

== Description ==
Neaetha wesolowskae is a small spider with a body divided into two main parts: a broad cephalothorax and an oval abdomen. The male has a rather high carapace, the hard upper part of the cephalothorax, that is 1.49 mm (0.059 in) long and 1.3 mm (0.051 in) wide. It is robust, and with a distinctive sloping thorax. The carapace is brown and covered in white scales with a distinct fovea, or depression, in its middle. There are more scales on the sides but none on the sternum, the underside of the cephalothorax, which is light brown. The spider has a darker eye field. The spider's face, or clypeus, is brown with light scales on the bottom. Its chelicerae are brown, with two forward teeth and one rear tooth. The rest of its mouthparts, including the labium, are also brown, but have light tips.

The abdomen is 1.2 mm (0.047 in) long and 0.71 mm (0.028 in) wide and has a pattern of three wide brown stripes on the top. It is covered in brown and whitish scales and hairs, the hairs being longer at the front. The underside of its abdomen is light grey with a pattern of darker spots. Its spinnerets are light brown and the legs are brown. The first pair of legs are wider than the others. Its pedipalps, sensory organs near its mouth, are hairy. The copulatory pedipalp ends in a palpal tibia that has a long narrowing projection, or tibial apophysis, which has a pointed and slightly bent tip. Attached to the tibia is a palpal bulb that has an ovoid tegulum with a straight sperm duct and a crescent-shaped embolus. The shape of its embolus differentiates the species from the related Neaetha absheronica, Neaetha membrosa and Neaetha tomkovichi.

The female has a similar carapace, although smaller at 0.86 mm (0.034 in) long and 0.74 mm (0.029 in) wide. Its carapace is brown and has black areas near the eyes like the male but is covered in brown as well as white scales. White scales can also be found on the brown clypeus, which has longer bristles as well. Its sternum and chelicerae are light brown and brown respectively like the male but the labium is darker. Its abdomen is more clearly different, as it is both smaller, measuring 0.97 mm (0.038 in) in length and between 0.72 mm (0.028 in) in width, and has a pattern of darker spots on a yellow background. Its spinnerets also differ, being light brown, and its legs are slightly lighter than the male's.

The females of the genus are generally hard to distinguish from others in the genus. However, the copulatory organs on Neaetha wesolowskae are distinctive. Its epigyne is large with a characteristic central pocket. This species has distinctive ovoid, rather than crescent-shaped, copulatory openings that lead to very short copulatory ducts. Its spermathecae, or receptacles, are as long as they are wide and sclerotized. The spider is particular similar to Neaetha tomkovichi, differing in the having a larger pocket on the epigyne and the way that its spermathecae are separated rather than together.

== Distribution and habitat ==
Neaetha spiders are generally found in southern Europe and Africa, and only occasionally in Asia. This species is one of that small number and is endemic to Thailand. It is similar to species found in Azerbaijan, Crete, Greece, India North Macedonia, Turkey and across Europe. The male holotype of the species was found in the Kanchanaburi province in 1979. The female paratype was found in Chonburi province during the same year. This is the most easterly that any spider in the genus has been observed. The species lives in rainforests.
