= Hasarius raychaudhurii =

Scientific classification
- Kingdom: Animalia
- Phylum: Arthropoda
- Subphylum: Chelicerata
- Class: Arachnida
- Order: Araneae
- Infraorder: Araneomorphae
- Family: Salticidae
- Genus: Hasarius
- Species: H. raychaudhurii

Binomial name
- Hasarius raychaudhurii Biswas, 2017

Species of spider

Hasarius raychaudhurii is a species of spider in the family Salticidae. It is named after researcher Dinendra Raychaudhuri. It is native to Bangladesh.
