= Hasarius firmus =

Scientific classification
- Kingdom: Animalia
- Phylum: Arthropoda
- Subphylum: Chelicerata
- Class: Arachnida
- Order: Araneae
- Infraorder: Araneomorphae
- Family: Salticidae
- Genus: Hasarius
- Species: H. firmus

Binomial name
- Hasarius firmus Wiśniewski & Wesołowska, 2013

Jumping spider species from Cameroon

Hasarius firmus is a jumping spider species in the genus Hasarius that lives in Cameroon. It was first described in 2013.
