= Hasarius rufociliatus =

Conservation status
- Vulnerable (IUCN 3.1)

Scientific classification
- Kingdom: Animalia
- Phylum: Arthropoda
- Subphylum: Chelicerata
- Class: Arachnida
- Order: Araneae
- Infraorder: Araneomorphae
- Family: Salticidae
- Genus: Hasarius
- Species: H. rufociliatus

Binomial name
- Hasarius rufociliatus (Simon, 1898)

Species of spider

Hasarius rufociliatus is a species of jumping spiders. The species is endemic to four islands in Seychelles: Curieuse, Mahé, Silhouette and Felicite.
