= Hasarius mahensis =

Conservation status
- Critically Endangered (IUCN 3.1)

Scientific classification
- Kingdom: Animalia
- Phylum: Arthropoda
- Subphylum: Chelicerata
- Class: Arachnida
- Order: Araneae
- Infraorder: Araneomorphae
- Family: Salticidae
- Genus: Hasarius
- Species: H. mahensis

Binomial name
- Hasarius mahensis (Wanless, 1984)

Species of spider

Hasarius mahensis is a species of jumping spider. The species is endemic to Mahé Island of Seychelles.
