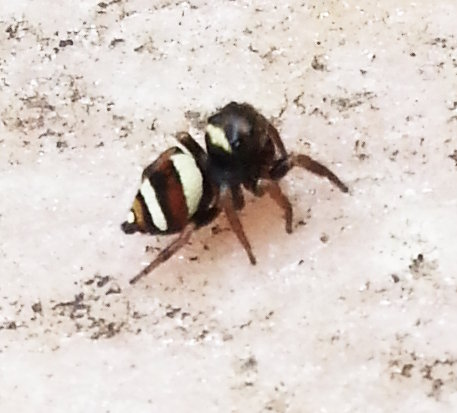
- female P. strupifer from Hong Kong

Scientific classification
- Kingdom: Animalia
- Phylum: Arthropoda
- Subphylum: Chelicerata
- Class: Arachnida
- Order: Araneae
- Infraorder: Araneomorphae
- Family: Salticidae
- Subtribe: Plexippina
- Genus: Ptocasius; Simon, 1885

Type species
- P. weyersi Simon, 1885

Species
- 67, see text

= Ptocasius =

Genus of spiders

Ptocasius is a genus of Asian jumping spiders that was first described by Eugène Louis Simon in 1885.

The genus name derives from the Greek word πτωχάς (ptōchas), meaning "fugitive".

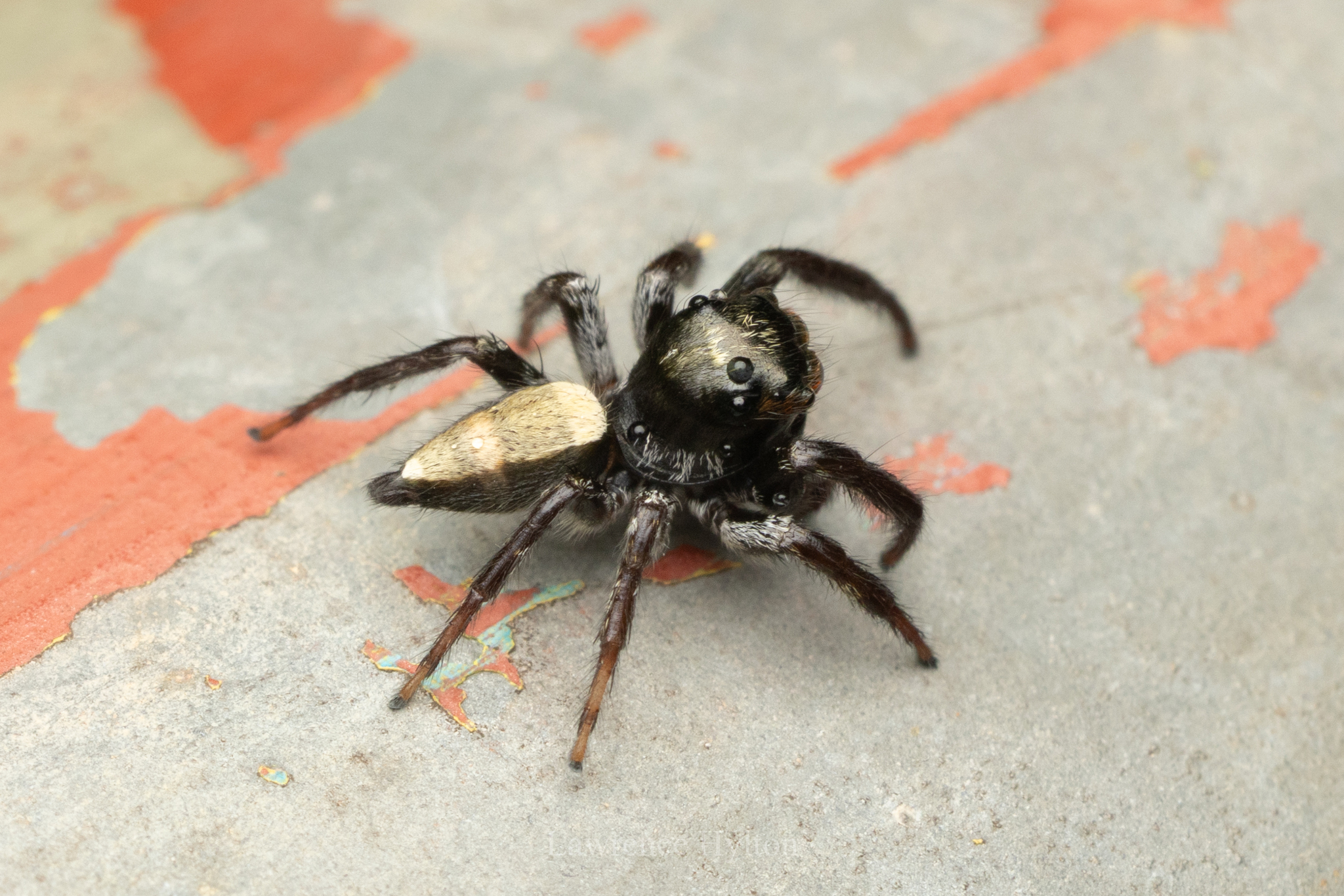
male P. strupifer from Hong Kong

== Description ==
According to Simon's original 1885 description, Ptocasius is similar to the genus Hasarius but can be distinguished by several morphological characteristics. The cephalothorax is nearly identical to Hasarius but the eye area above is slightly longer, being barely one-quarter wider than long and either parallel or slightly wider posteriorly. Both anterior eye rows are convex. The eyes resemble those of Hasarius, but the posterior eyes of the second series are positioned wider apart from the posterior eyes than from the more distant anterior eyes.

The labial part is much more attenuated than in Hasarius. The chelicerae have an inferior margin furnished with two geminated teeth of very unequal size, with the second tooth being much smaller than the first. In males, the maxillae have an external posterior angular denticulation. The legs are similar to those of Hasarius, but the tibiae and metatarsi of legs I and II bear lateral spines on both sides, while tibiae I and II lack dorsal spines. Legs III and IV have a dorsal spine positioned in a smaller basin. The integument is clothed with simple hairs that are not squamiform.

Simon also noted that Ptocasius is closely related to the genus Cytaea but differs in having a shorter and more elevated cephalothorax, chelicerae with a superior margin provided with two teeth as in Hasarius (while Cytaea has four small teeth), two very unequal teeth on the inferior margin, and integuments furnished with simple pubescence rather than the squamous pubescence found in Cytaea.

== Species ==
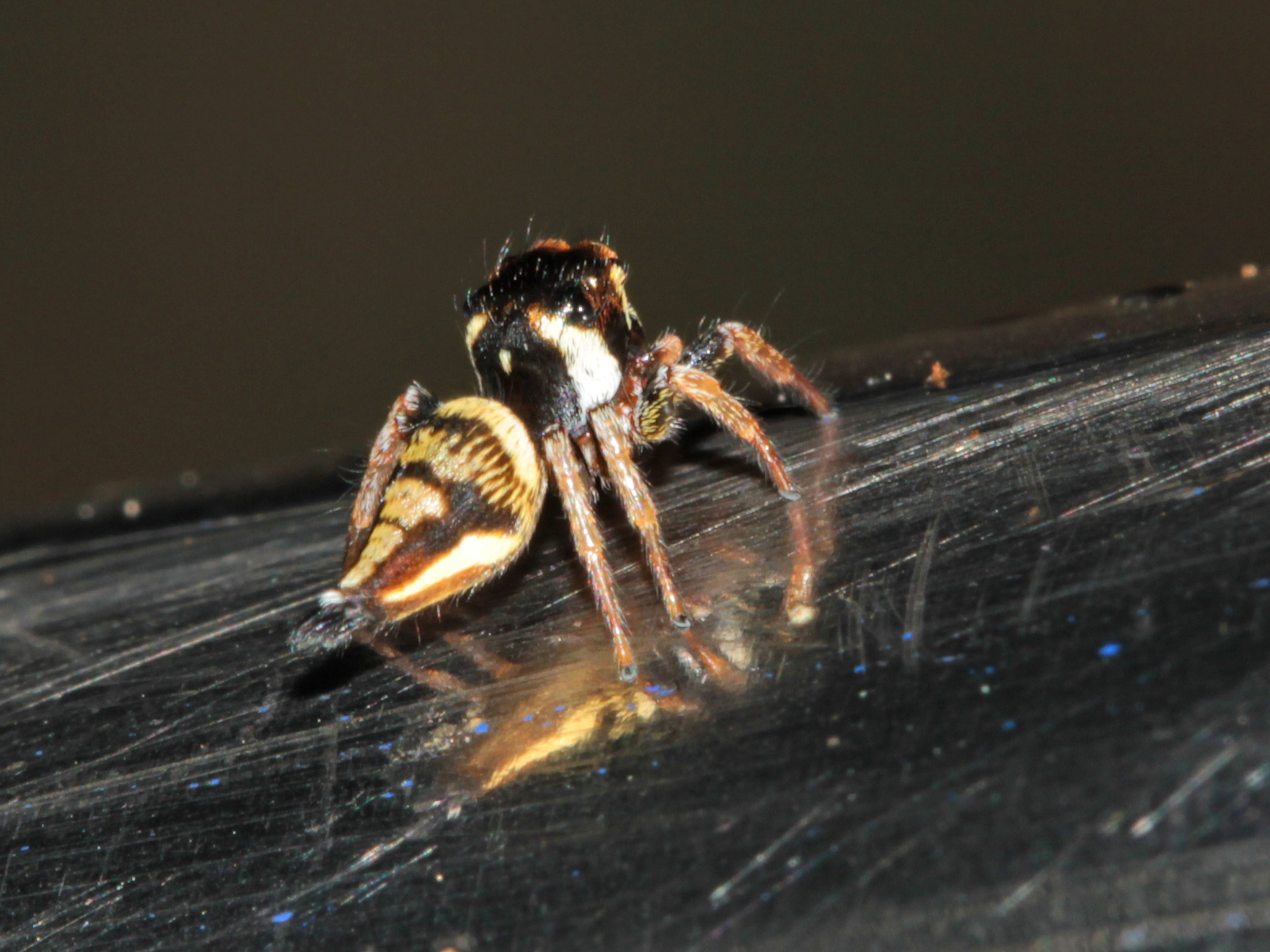
P. weyersi from Thailand

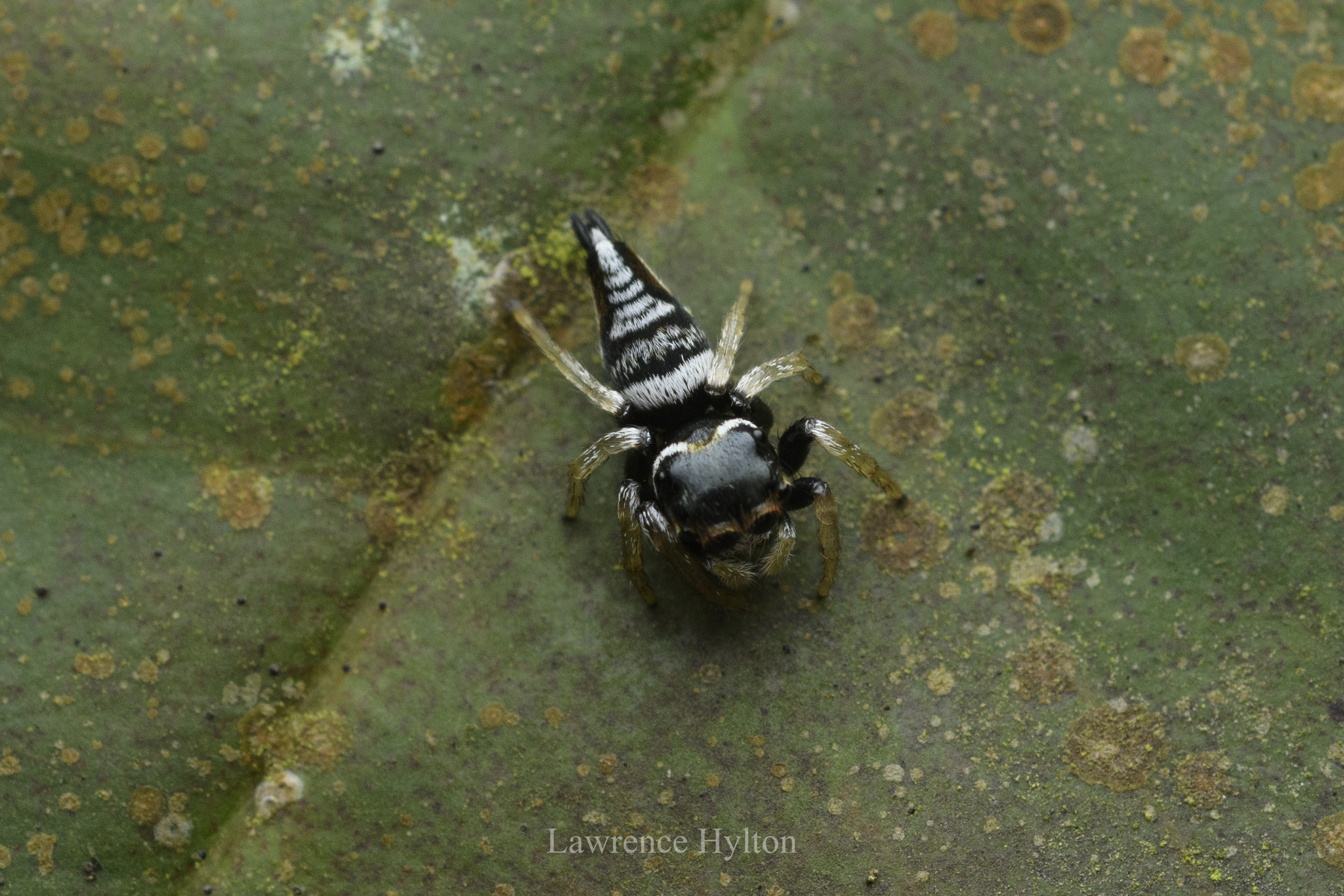
P. weyersi from Thailand

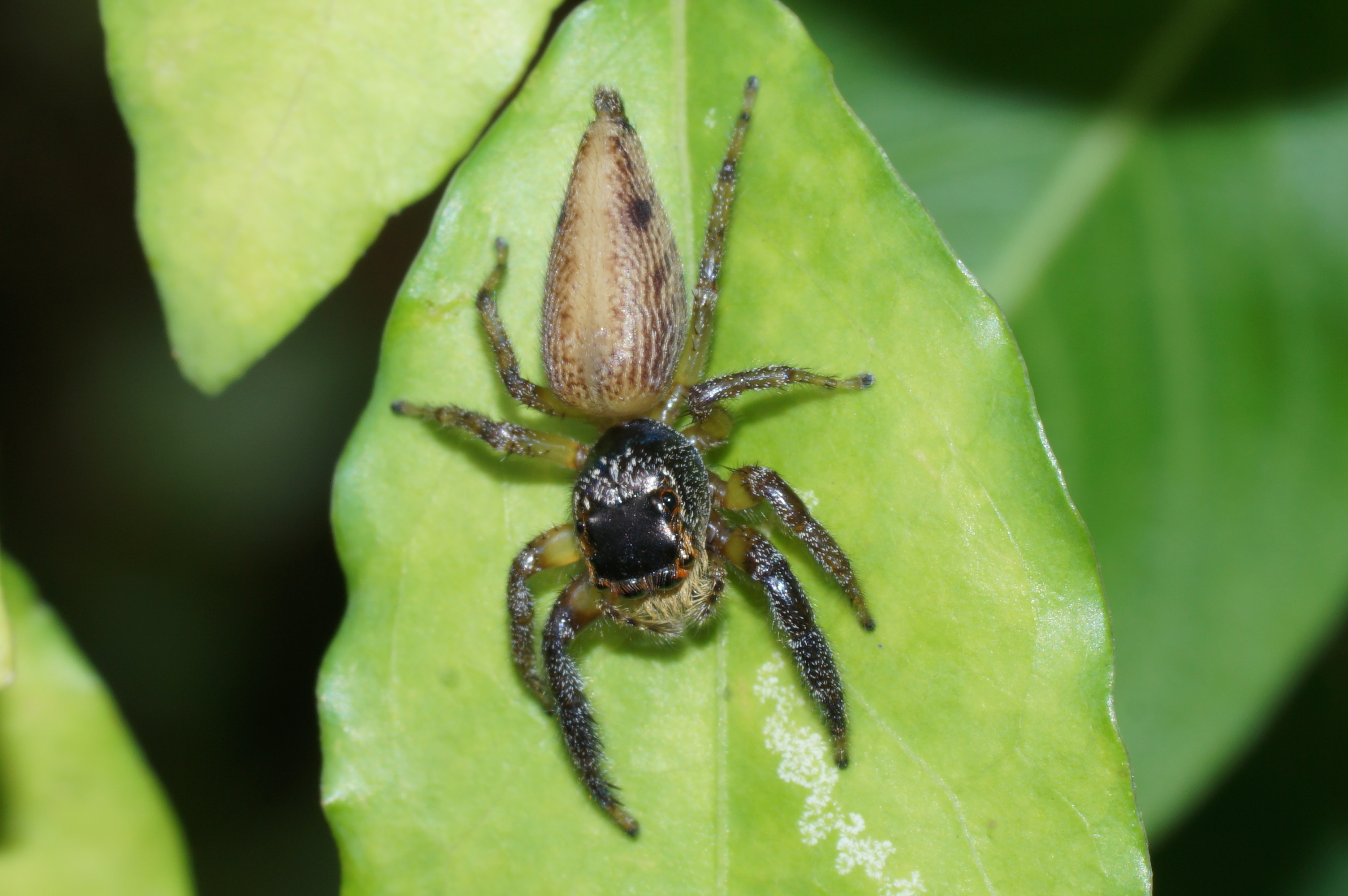
P. yashodharae

As of August 2025 it contains almost 70 described species, found only in Asia:

- Ptocasius angulatus Yang & Peng, 2023 – China
- Ptocasius badongensis (Song & Chai, 1992) – China
- Ptocasius bhutanicus (Żabka, 1981) – Bhutan
- Ptocasius bulbosus (Peng, Tang & Li, 2008) – China
- Ptocasius cambridgei (Żabka, 1981) – Bhutan
- Ptocasius circulus Yang & Peng, 2023 – China
- Ptocasius danzhu Yang & Peng, 2023 – China
- Ptocasius davidi Yang & Peng, 2023 – China
- Ptocasius dian C. Wang, Mi & Peng, 2023 – China
- Ptocasius falcatus (Zhu, J. X. Zhang, Z. S. Zhang & Chen, 2005) – China
- Ptocasius filiformus Yang & Peng, 2023 – China
- Ptocasius foliolatus Yang & Peng, 2023 – China
- Ptocasius fulvonitens Simon, 1902 – Sri Lanka
- Ptocasius geminus Yang & Peng, 2023 – China
- Ptocasius gogonaicus (Żabka, 1981) – Bhutan
- Ptocasius gratiosus G. W. Peckham & E. G. Peckham, 1907 – Singapore
- Ptocasius helvetorum (Żabka, 1981) – Bhutan
- Ptocasius hubeiensis (Li, Wang, Irfan & Peng, 2018) – China
- Ptocasius hybridus (Żabka, 1981) – Bhutan
- Ptocasius incognitus (Żabka, 1981) – Bhutan
- Ptocasius intermedius (Żabka, 1981) – Bhutan
- Ptocasius jietouensis Yang & Peng, 2023 – China
- Ptocasius kinhi Żabka, 1985 – China, Vietnam
- Ptocasius linzhiensis Hu, 2001 – China
- Ptocasius longapophysis Yang & Peng, 2023 – China
- Ptocasius longlingensis Yang & Peng, 2023 – China
- Ptocasius lushiensis (Zhang & Zhu, 2007) – China
- Ptocasius metzneri Patoleta, Gardzińska & Żabka, 2020 – Thailand
- Ptocasius montanus (Żabka, 1981) – China, Bhutan
- Ptocasius montiformis Song, 1991 – China
- Ptocasius nepalicus (Żabka, 1980) – Nepal, China
- Ptocasius nobilis (Żabka, 1981) – Bhutan
- Ptocasius novus (Żabka, 1981) – Bhutan
- Ptocasius orientalis (Żabka, 1981) – Bhutan
- Ptocasius originalis (Żabka, 1981) – Myanmar
- Ptocasius paraweyersi Cao & Li, 2016 – China, Vietnam
- Ptocasius pilosus (Żabka, 1981) – Bhutan
- Ptocasius plumipalpis (Thorell, 1895) – Myanmar
- Ptocasius pseudoflexus (Liu, Yang & Peng, 2016) – China
- Ptocasius pulchellus (Li, Wang, Irfan & Peng, 2018) – China
- Ptocasius rectangulus Yang & Peng, 2023 – China
- Ptocasius robustus Yang & Peng, 2023 – China
- Ptocasius sakaerat Patoleta, Gardzińska & Żabka, 2020 – Thailand
- Ptocasius senchalensis (Prószyński, 1992) – India
- Ptocasius silvaticus (Żabka, 1981) – Bhutan
- Ptocasius simoni (Żabka, 1981) – Bhutan
- Ptocasius songi Logunov, 1995 – China
- Ptocasius stemmleri (Żabka, 1981) – Bhutan
- Ptocasius strandi (Żabka, 1981) – Bhutan
- Ptocasius strupifer Simon, 1901 – China, Vietnam
- Ptocasius subhubeiensis C. Wang, Mi & Peng, 2023 – China
- Ptocasius supinus (Żabka, 1981) – Bhutan
- Ptocasius tenellus (Żabka, 1981) – Bhutan
- Ptocasius tengchongensis Yang & Peng, 2023 – China
- Ptocasius tenzingi (Żabka, 1980) – Nepal
- Ptocasius thakkholaicus (Żabka, 1980) – Nepal, China
- Ptocasius thimphuicus (Żabka, 1981) – Bhutan
- Ptocasius umbellulatus Yang & Peng, 2023 – China
- Ptocasius urbanii (Żabka, 1981) – Bhutan, China
- Ptocasius variegatus Logunov, 1995 – Kazakhstan
- Ptocasius versicolor (Żabka, 1981) – Bhutan
- Ptocasius vittatus Song, 1991 – China
- Ptocasius wangdicus (Żabka, 1981) – Bhutan
- Ptocasius weyersi Simon, 1885 – Vietnam, Indonesia (Sumatra)
- Ptocasius wuermli (Żabka, 1981) – Bhutan, China
- Ptocasius zabkai Yang & Peng, 2023 – China
- Ptocasius zonatus Yang & Peng, 2023 – China
