= Neaetha catula =

Scientific classification
- Kingdom: Animalia
- Phylum: Arthropoda
- Subphylum: Chelicerata
- Class: Arachnida
- Order: Araneae
- Infraorder: Araneomorphae
- Family: Salticidae
- Genus: Neaetha
- Species: N. catula

Binomial name
- Neaetha catula Simon, 1886

Species of spider

Neaetha catula is a species of jumping spider in the genus Neaetha that lives in East and Southern Africa. The male was first described in 1886 by Eugène Simon and the female by Ludovico di Caporiacco in 1949. First discovered in Zanzibar, examples have also been identified in Kenya. The spider is small, 3 mm (0.12 in) long, with a generally black cephalothorax and abdomen, although the abdomen has a pattern of spots towards the rear and a thin line that divides it in two. The species can be distinguished from others in the genus by the lack of central pocket in the female's epigyne. This feature led Dmitri Logunov to consider whether the spider belongs to the genus.

== Taxonomy ==
Neaetha catula was first described by Eugène Simon in 1886. It was allocated to the genus Neaetha, which itself had been first raised by Simon in 1884. The genus is named for two Greek words, néos, which means new, and théa, which can be translated aspect. The species was considered of uncertain taxonomic status by Dmitri Logunov in 2009.

The species in the genus are hard to distinguish, leading to Barbara Patoleta and Marek Żabka suggesting that to understand the relationships between the different species requires the study of genes rather than physical attributes. A DNA analysis study undertaken by Wayne Maddison and Marshall Hedin identified that the genus is most closely related to the genus Salticus. It has also phylogenetic] similarities with Carrhotus and Hasarius, amongst other genera of jumping spiders. The genus was placed in the subtribe Harmochirina in the tribe Plexippini by Maddison in 2015. These were allocated to the clade Saltafresia. The subtribe is divided into harmochirines and pellenines, and the genus is allocated to the latter group, which is characterised by living on open sunny ground.

== Description ==
The spider is short, measuring 3 mm (0.12 in) in length. It has a black cephalothorax that is thinner in the middle. The cephalon is yellow and covered in scales. Scales can also be found at the edges of the carapace, particularly around the thorax. A central line crosses the carapace, and another crosses the abdomen, dividing it into a plain black area towards the front and a more rearward area that has a pattern of spots. The chelicerae are also black. The legs are more colourful, although also mainly black. The pedipalps are yellow. The male has a bulbous palpal bulb and a long embolus. The females of the genus are generally hard to distinguish. In this species, the female has an epigyne that does not have the central pocket that is common to other members of the genus, which has led to doubts about whether it belongs to the genus.

== Distribution and habitat ==
The spider was first observed in Zanzibar. It was subsequently also found near Mackinnon Road, Kenya. The species distribution extends to East and Southern Africa.
