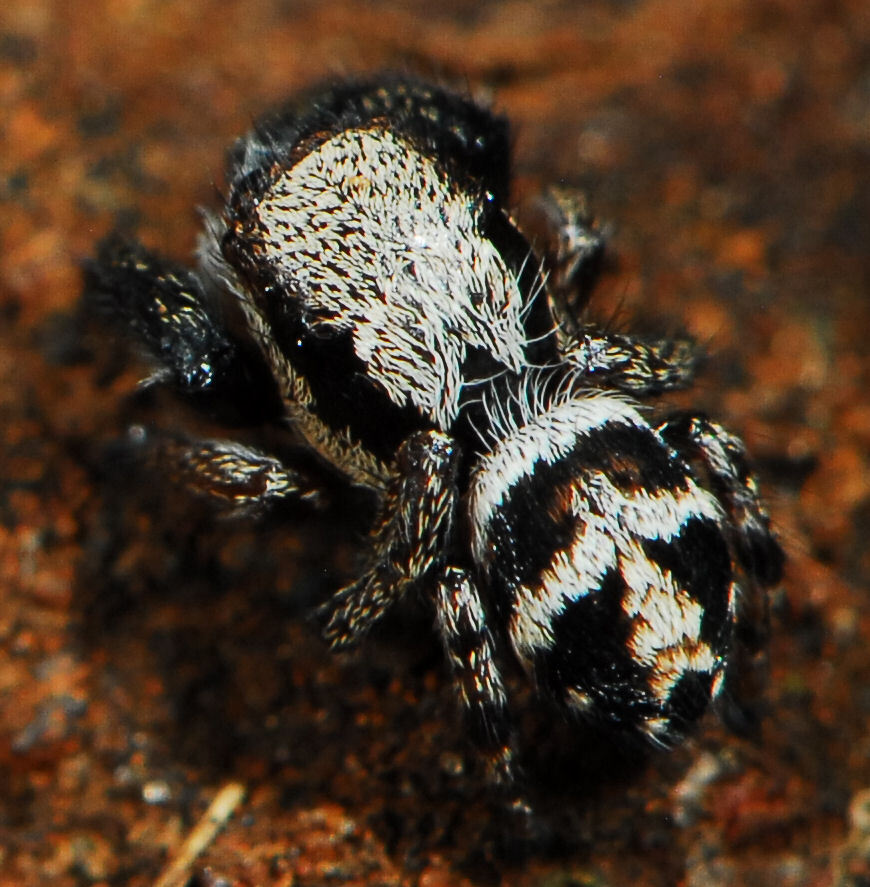
- female
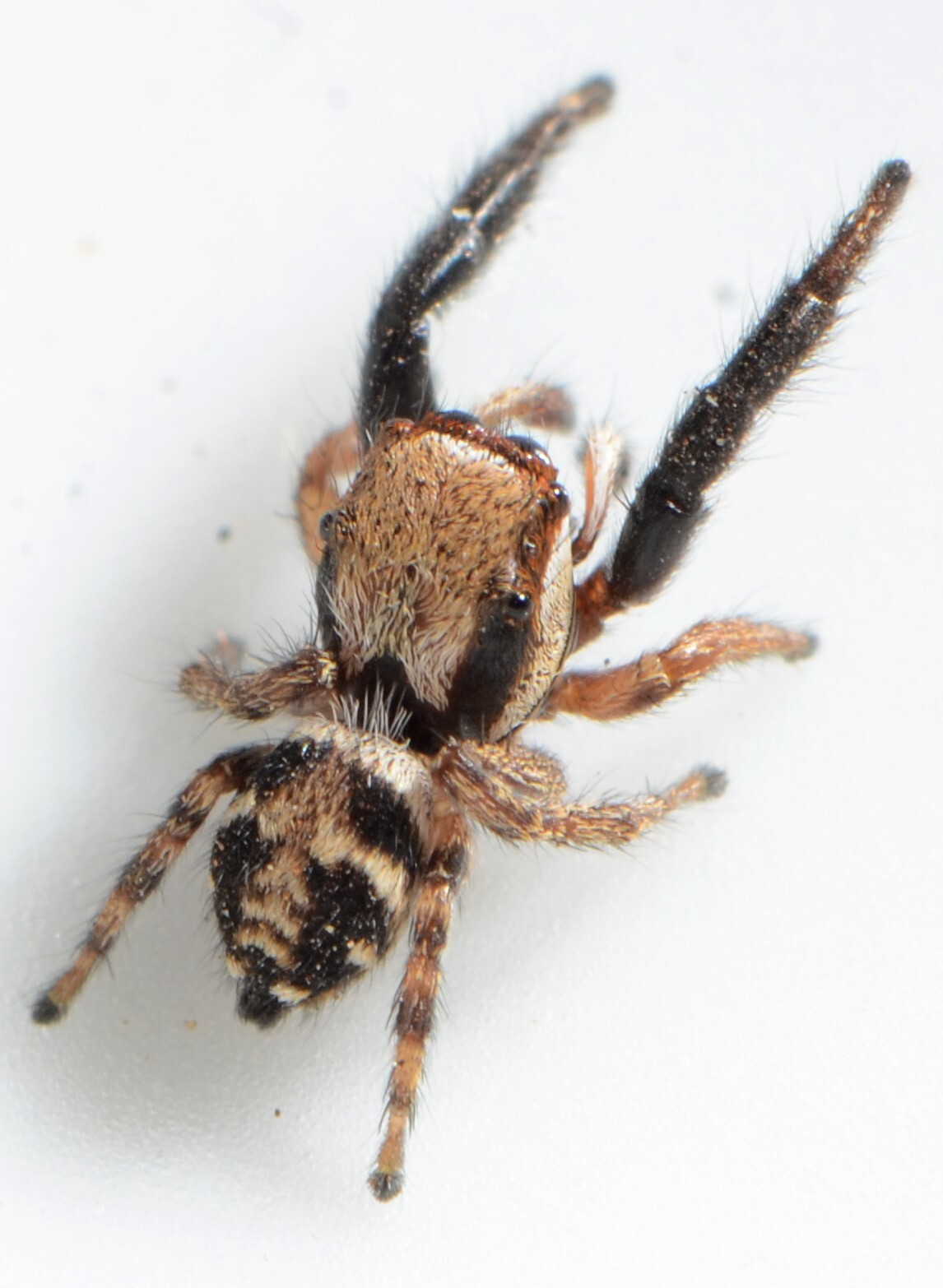
- male

Scientific classification
- Kingdom: Animalia
- Phylum: Arthropoda
- Subphylum: Chelicerata
- Class: Arachnida
- Order: Araneae
- Infraorder: Araneomorphae
- Family: Salticidae
- Genus: Neaetha
- Species: N. bulawayoensis

Binomial name
- Neaetha bulawayoensis (Wesołowska, 2000)

= Neaetha bulawayoensis =

Species of jumping spider

Neaetha bulawayoensis is a species of jumping spider in the genus Neaetha that lives in Lesotho, South Africa, Uganda, and Zimbabwe. With a specific name based on the place where its holotype was found, Bulawayo in Zimbabwe, it is one of the most widespread ground-dwelling jumping spiders in central South Africa, found in both forests and in houses. The species is medium-sized, with a carapace that is between 2 and 3 mm in length and an abdomen that is between 2.2 and 3 mm in length, although the female is slightly larger than the male. The spider has a distinctive look from the front, with the male having an unusual black and white pattern on the area below its eyes, its clypeus, while the female clypeus and eye field are covered in white hairs, which give the impression that it has a white face. The spider was originally described in 2000 with the name Pellenes bulawayoensis but was moved to its current genus in 2024.

== Taxonomy and etymology ==
Neaetha bulawayoensis is a species of jumping spider, a member of the family Salticidae. The species was first described by the arachnologist Wanda Wesołowska in 2000 with the name Pellenes bulawayoensis. Wesołowska allocated the spider to the genus Pellenes, which had been first circumscribed in 1876 by Eugène Simon. In 2000, Dmitri Logunov and Yuri Marusik divided the genus Pellenes into four subgenera, based on the shape of the male palpal bulb. The species was allocated to the subgenus Pelmultus.

In 2024, Guilherme Azevedo, Marshal Hedin and Wayne Maddison moved the species to the genus Neaetha based on its physiology. The species in Neaetha are hard to distinguish, leading to Barbara Patoleta and Marek Żabka suggesting that to understand the relationships between the different species it is required to study the genes of the spiders rather than their physical attributes. A DNA analysis study undertaken by Maddison and Hedin identified that the genus is most closely related to the genus Salticus. The genus had been placed in the subtribe Harmochirina in the tribe Plexippini by Maddison in 2015. It was allocated to the clade Saltafresia. The subtribe is divided into harmochirines and pellenines, and the genus is allocated to the latter group, which is characterised by the way that the spiders live on open sunny ground. In 2016, Jerzy Prószyński allocated the genus to the Harmochirines group of genera.

The genus Neaetha is named for two Greek words, néos, which means 'new', and théa, which can be translated 'aspect'. The species is named after the place where it was first found.

== Description ==
Neaetha bulawayoensis is a medium-sized spider. It has a body that is divided into two main parts: a cephalothorax and an abdomen. The male has a carapace, the hard upper part of the cephalothorax, that is between 2 and 2.7 mm (0.08 and 0.11 in) in length and between 1.7 and 2.2 mm (0.07 and 0.09 in) in width. It is a dark brown oval, moderately high, with stripes of white hairs near the back. In some instances the spider has a wide white band down the middle of its carapace. The black eye field is covered in white hairs, with brown bristles near the eyes themselves. The underside, or sternum, is blackish. There is a characteristic black and white pattern on the high clypeus, the area under its eyes. The chelicerae are black with distinctive rows of white hairs on them while rest of the mouthparts, the labium and maxillae, are blackish.

The male has an abdomen that ranges between 2.2 and 2.5 mm (0.10 in) in length and between 1.2 and 1.9 mm (0.05 and 0.07 in) in width. It is generally brownish with a pattern on top of two white streaks near the front, a scattering of triangular patches in the middle and round spots to the rear. The underside is paler and is marked with a large grey patch. The spider's rear spinnerets are darker than those to the front. Its front legs are black and both longer and wider than the other. The remainder are yellow.

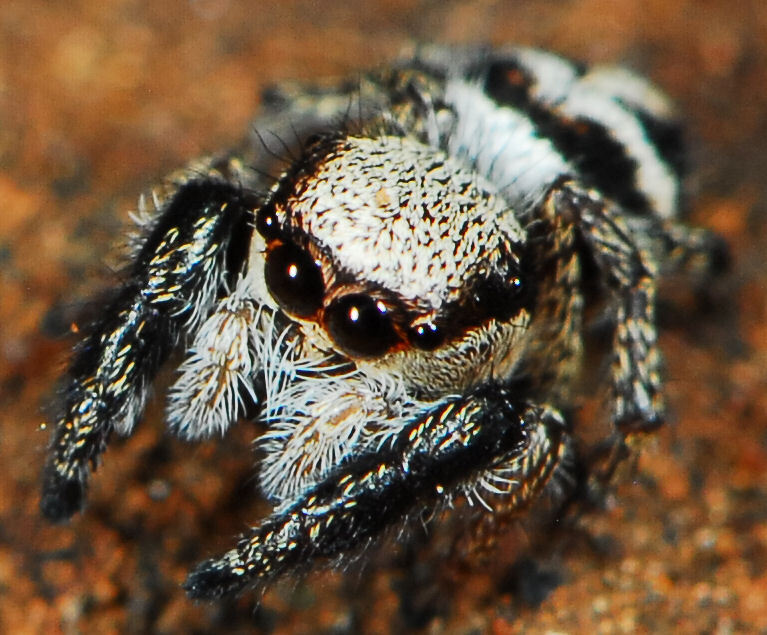
female

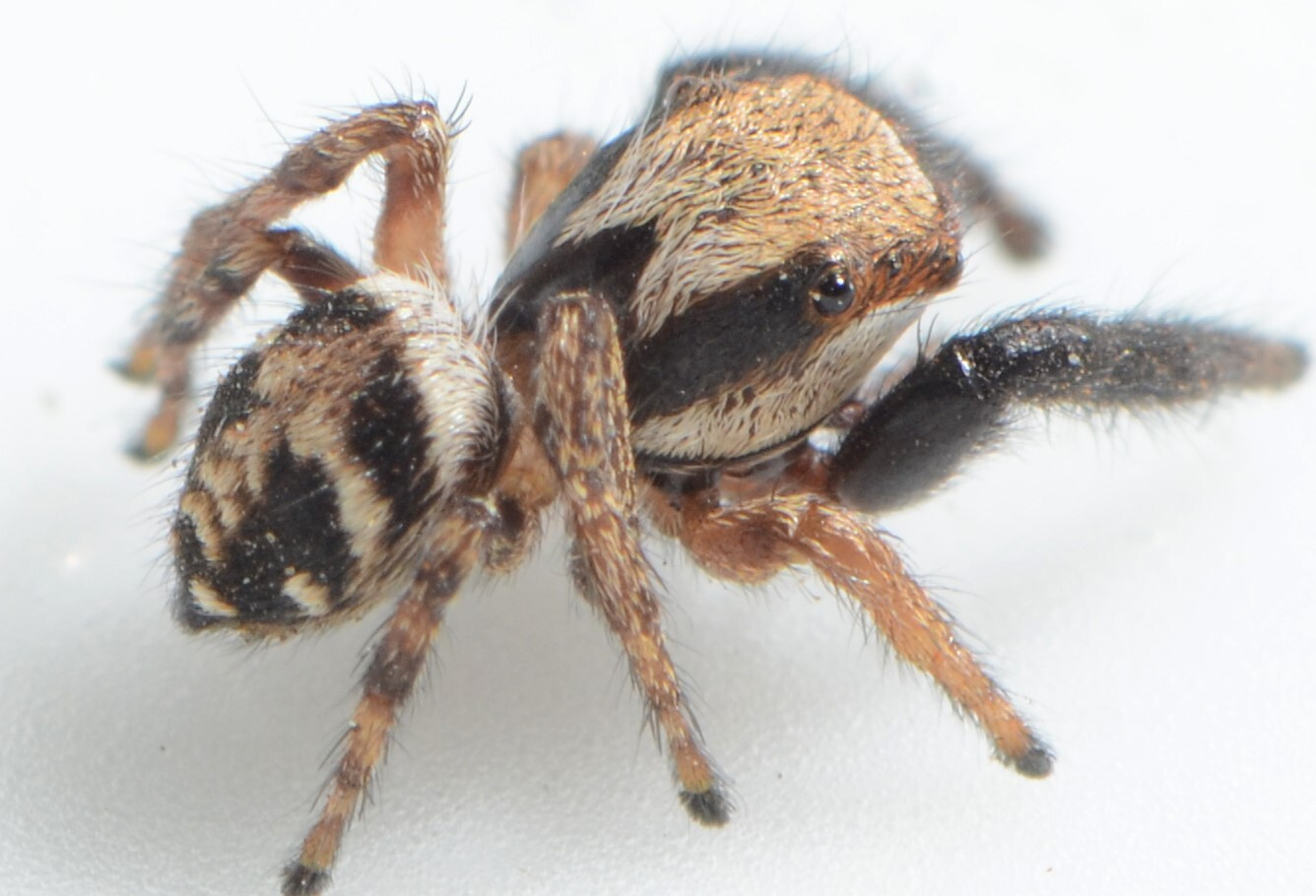
male

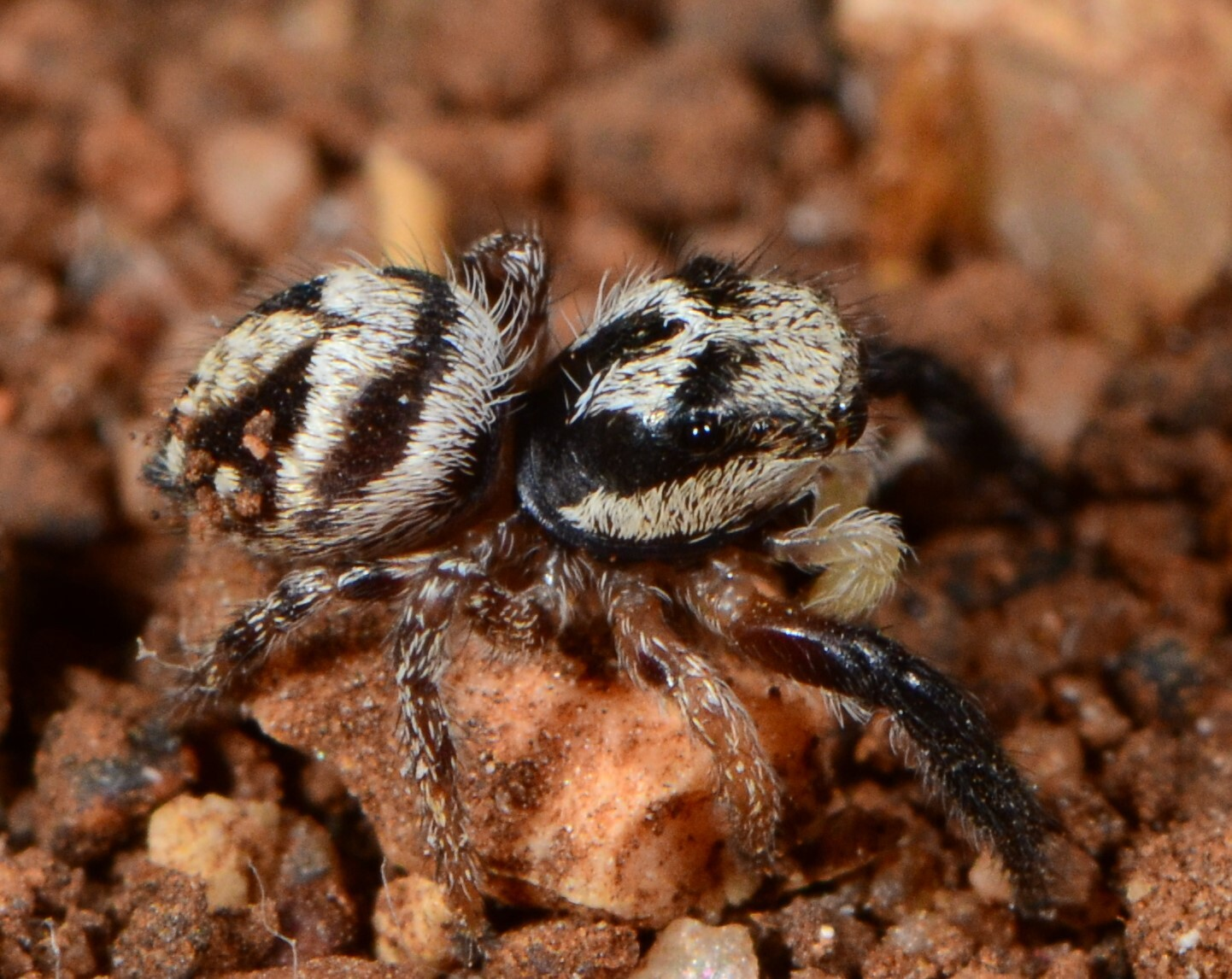
juvenile male

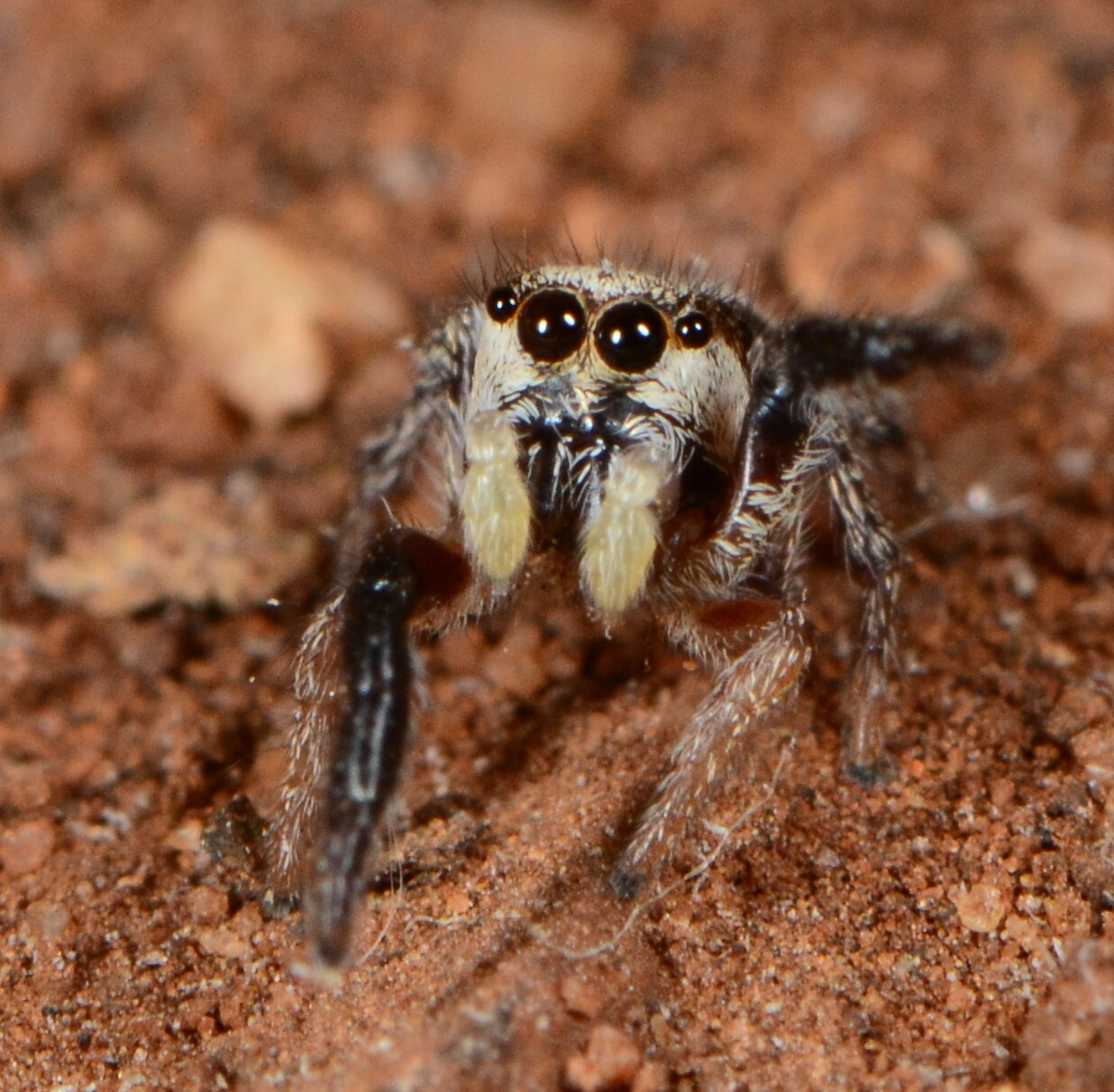
juvenile male

The spider's reproductive system is similar to others in the genus. It has pale pedipalps, sensual organs near the mouth, and a darker cymbium. The rounded palpal bulb has a narrow relatively short needle-like embolus projecting from it, which is accompanied by a thicker projection or apophysis that makes it look as if the spider has a double embolus. Both the embolus and apophysis curve, following the shape of the palpal bulb. The species has a large apophysis on the tibia that shows signs of sclerotization. It curves slightly to follow a groove in the cymbium. The shape of the palpal tibia is the main reason that the species was recognised as a member of Neaetha. The male is similar to Pellenes lucidus, differing in the way that the abdomen is marked with two rather than one stripe and the way that the embolus projects away from the palpal bulb.

The females of the genus are generally hard to distinguish. The female Neaetha bulawayoensis is larger than the male. It has a carapace and abdomen both typically 3 mm (0.12 in) long. Its carapace is wider than the male, measuring 2.5 mm in width, while its abdomen is typically 2.3 mm (0.09 in) wide. The carapace has a similar pattern on its top but the front is different. The sides of the carapace and the eye field are covered in white hairs and scales. White hairs are also present on the clypeus giving the impression that the whole spider has a distinctive white shade. This contrasts with the eyes, which are surrounded by black rings. The front leg is shorter than the male's and is mainly brown with black sections. The remaining legs are orange.

The female's copulatory organs are distinctive. The external copulatory organ, the epigyne is split into two by a small divide. There are two copulatory openings that lead into short insemination ducts. The ducts connect to multi-chambered spermathecae, or receptacles. There are also narrow accessory glands.

== Distribution and habitat ==
Neaetha bulawayoensis has been observed in Lesotho, South Africa, Uganda, and Zimbabwe. The first specimen were found in Zimbabwe. The holotype was a male discovered in Bulawayo in 1962. The first example to be found in Uganda was discovered near Kampala in 1996. The first example from Lesotho was found in 2003 in a Eucalyptus tree. In 2006, the spider of the species was seen in the Ndumo Game Reserve, South Africa living on a Vachellia xanthophloea tree. It has been subsequently found in other parts of South Africa and is recognised as one of the most common and most widespread ground-dwelling jumping spiders in central South Africa. As well as in the wild, the spider has also been seen in houses.
