= Abacoproeces molestus =

Scientific classification
- Kingdom: Animalia
- Phylum: Arthropoda
- Subphylum: Chelicerata
- Class: Arachnida
- Order: Araneae
- Infraorder: Araneomorphae
- Family: Linyphiidae
- Genus: Abacoproeces
- Species: A. molestus

Binomial name
- Abacoproeces molestus (Thaler, 1973)

Species of spider

Abacoproeces molestus is a species of spider belonging to the family Linyphiidae.

It is native to Austria.
