= Ptocasius fulvonitens =

Scientific classification
- Kingdom: Animalia
- Phylum: Arthropoda
- Subphylum: Chelicerata
- Class: Arachnida
- Order: Araneae
- Infraorder: Araneomorphae
- Family: Salticidae
- Genus: Ptocasius
- Species: P. fulvonitens

Binomial name
- Ptocasius fulvonitens Simon, 1902

Species of spider

Ptocasius fulvonitens is a species of spider of the genus Ptocasius. It is endemic to Sri Lanka.
