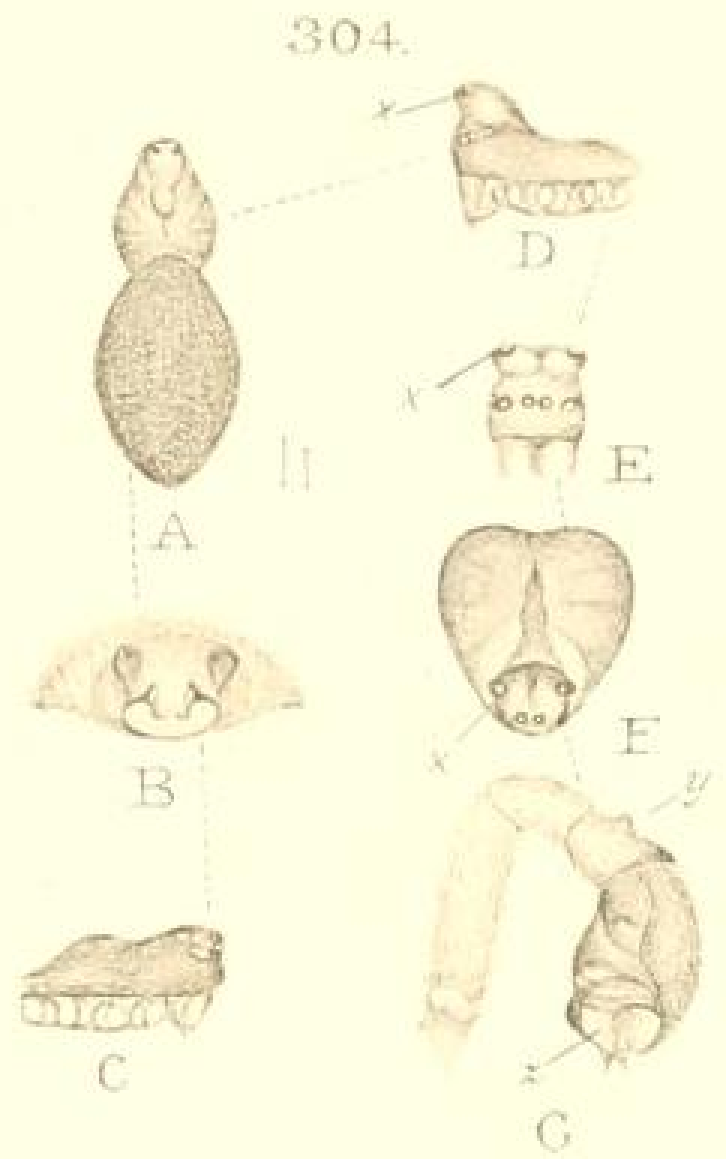
- Diagnostic drawings of A. saltuum

Scientific classification
- Kingdom: Animalia
- Phylum: Arthropoda
- Subphylum: Chelicerata
- Class: Arachnida
- Order: Araneae
- Infraorder: Araneomorphae
- Family: Linyphiidae
- Genus: Abacoproeces; Simon, 1884

Type species
- A. saltuum (L. Koch, 1872)

Species
- A. molestus Thaler, 1973 – Austria; A. saltuum (L. Koch, 1872) – Europe, Russia (Europe to South Siberia)

= Abacoproeces =

Genus of spiders

Abacoproeces is a genus of dwarf spiders that was first described by Eugène Louis Simon in 1884. As of May 2021 it contains two species: A. molestus and A. saltuum.
