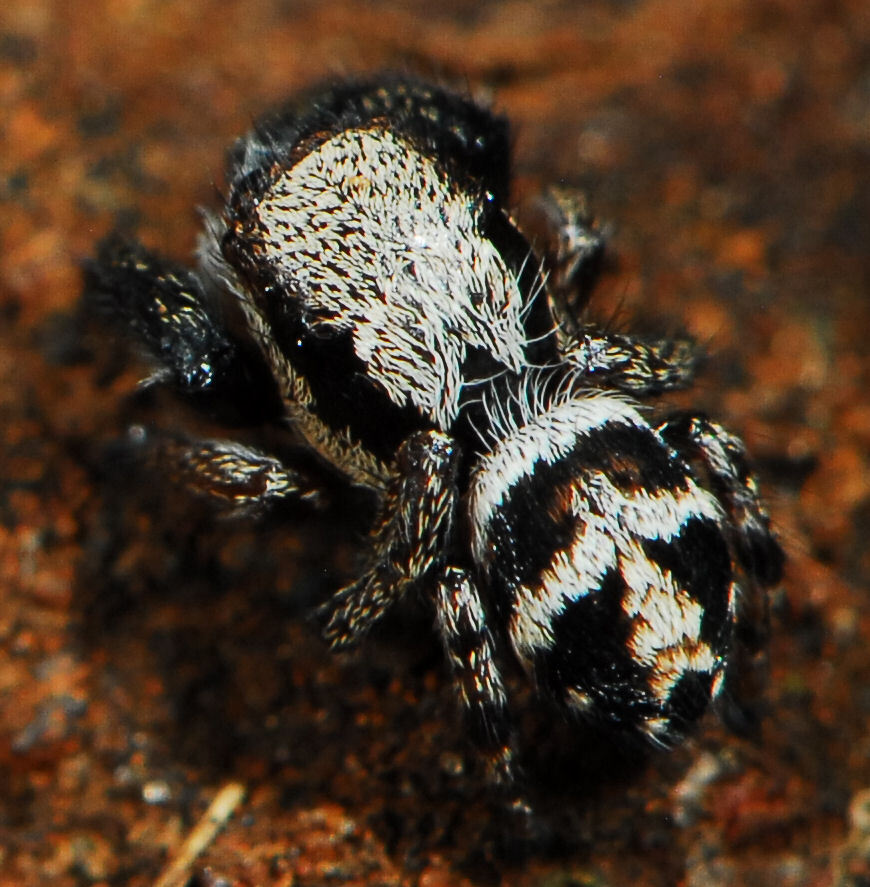
- female N. bulawayoensis
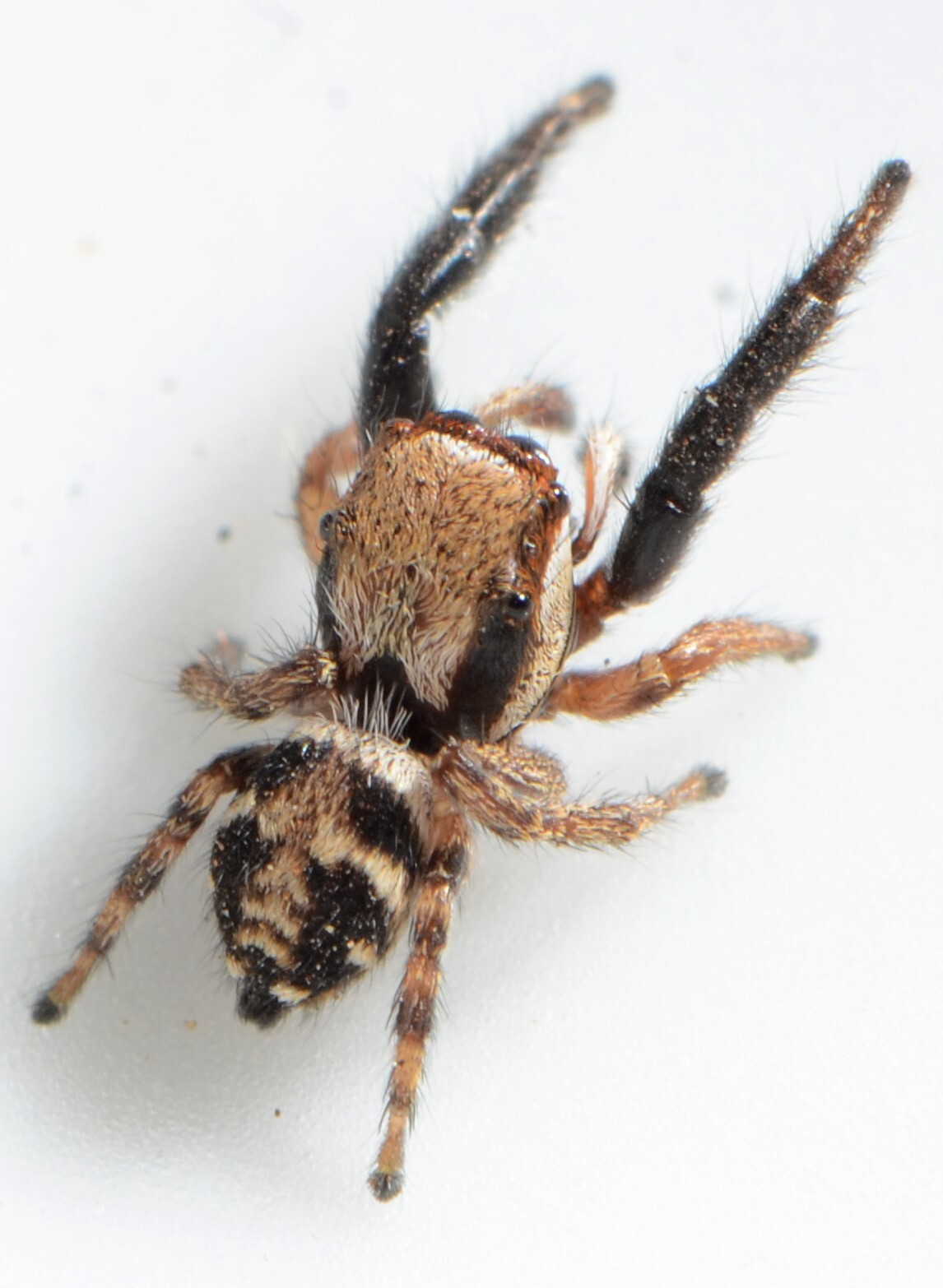
- male N. bulawayoensis

Scientific classification
- Kingdom: Animalia
- Phylum: Arthropoda
- Subphylum: Chelicerata
- Class: Arachnida
- Order: Araneae
- Infraorder: Araneomorphae
- Family: Salticidae
- Subfamily: Salticinae
- Genus: Neaetha; Simon, 1885

Type species
- N. membrosa (Simon, 1868)

Species
- 14, see text

= Neaetha =

Genus of spiders

Neaetha is a genus of jumping spiders that was first described by Eugène Louis Simon in 1885.

Neaetha are found in Asia, Europe, and Africa.

== Species ==
As of October 2025, this genus includes fourteen species:

- Neaetha absheronica Logunov & Guseinov, 2002 – Albania, North Macedonia, Greece, Turkey, Azerbaijan
- Neaetha alborufula Caporiacco, 1949 – Kenya
- Neaetha bulawayoensis (Wesołowska, 2000) – Uganda, Zimbabwe, South Africa, Lesotho
- Neaetha catula Simon, 1886 – East, Southern Africa
- Neaetha catulina Berland & Millot, 1941 – Mali
- Neaetha cerussata (Simon, 1868) – Italy (Sicily), Greece, Egypt, Syria
- Neaetha fulvopilosa (Lucas, 1846) – Algeria, Tunisia
- Neaetha irreperta Wesołowska & Russell-Smith, 2000 – Tanzania, Mozambique, South Africa
- Neaetha maxima Wesołowska & Russell-Smith, 2011 – Guinea, Ivory Coast, Nigeria, Uganda, Mozambique
- Neaetha membrosa (Simon, 1868) – Western Mediterranean to Germany (type species)
- Neaetha oculata (O. Pickard-Cambridge, 1876) – Botswana, Nigeria, Egypt, Israel, Saudi Arabia, Yemen, United Arab Emirates
- Neaetha ravoisiaei (Lucas, 1846) – Algeria, East Africa
- Neaetha tomkovichi Logunov, 2019 – India
- Neaetha wesolowskae Żabka & Patoleta, 2020 – Thailand
