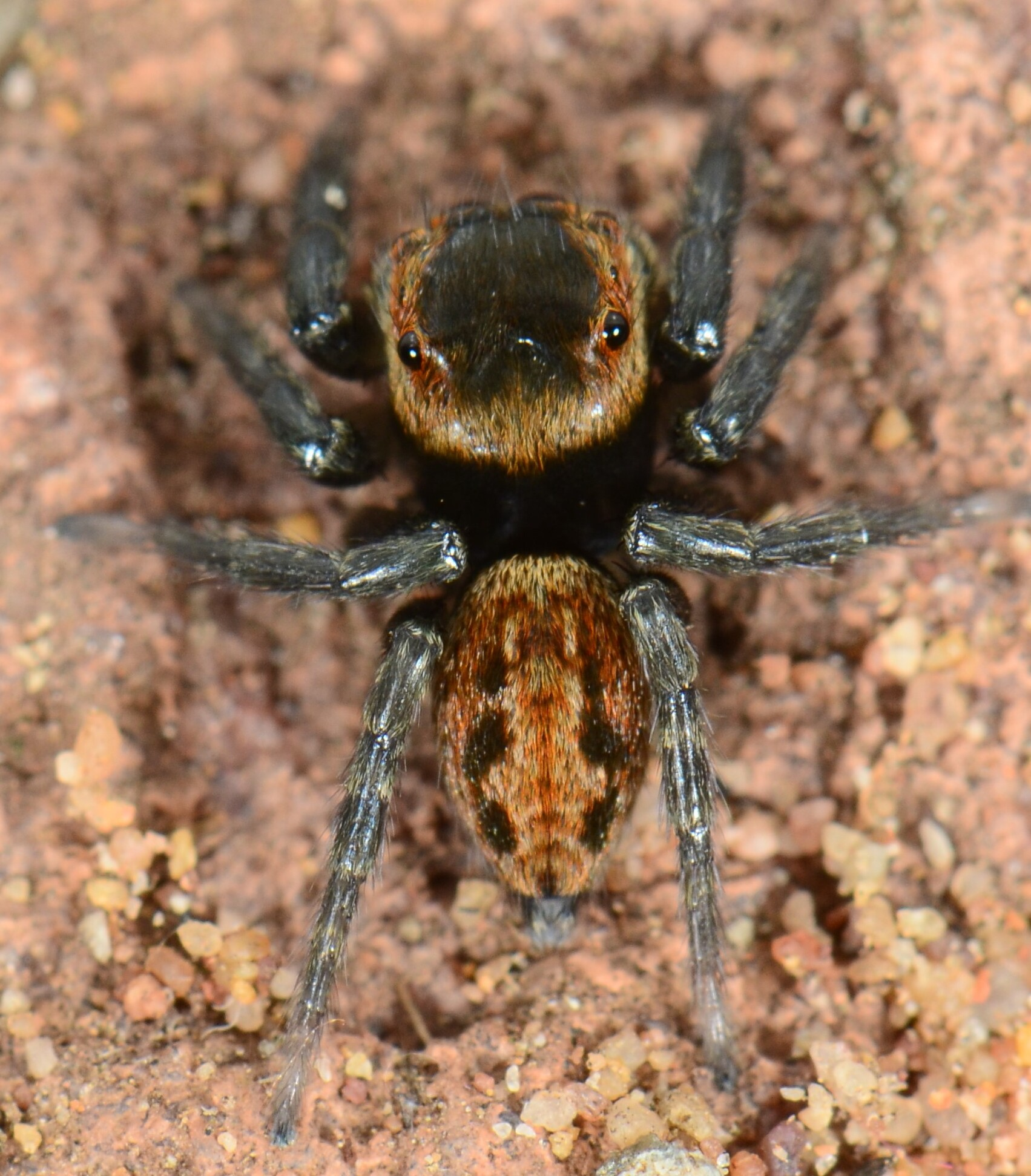
- female
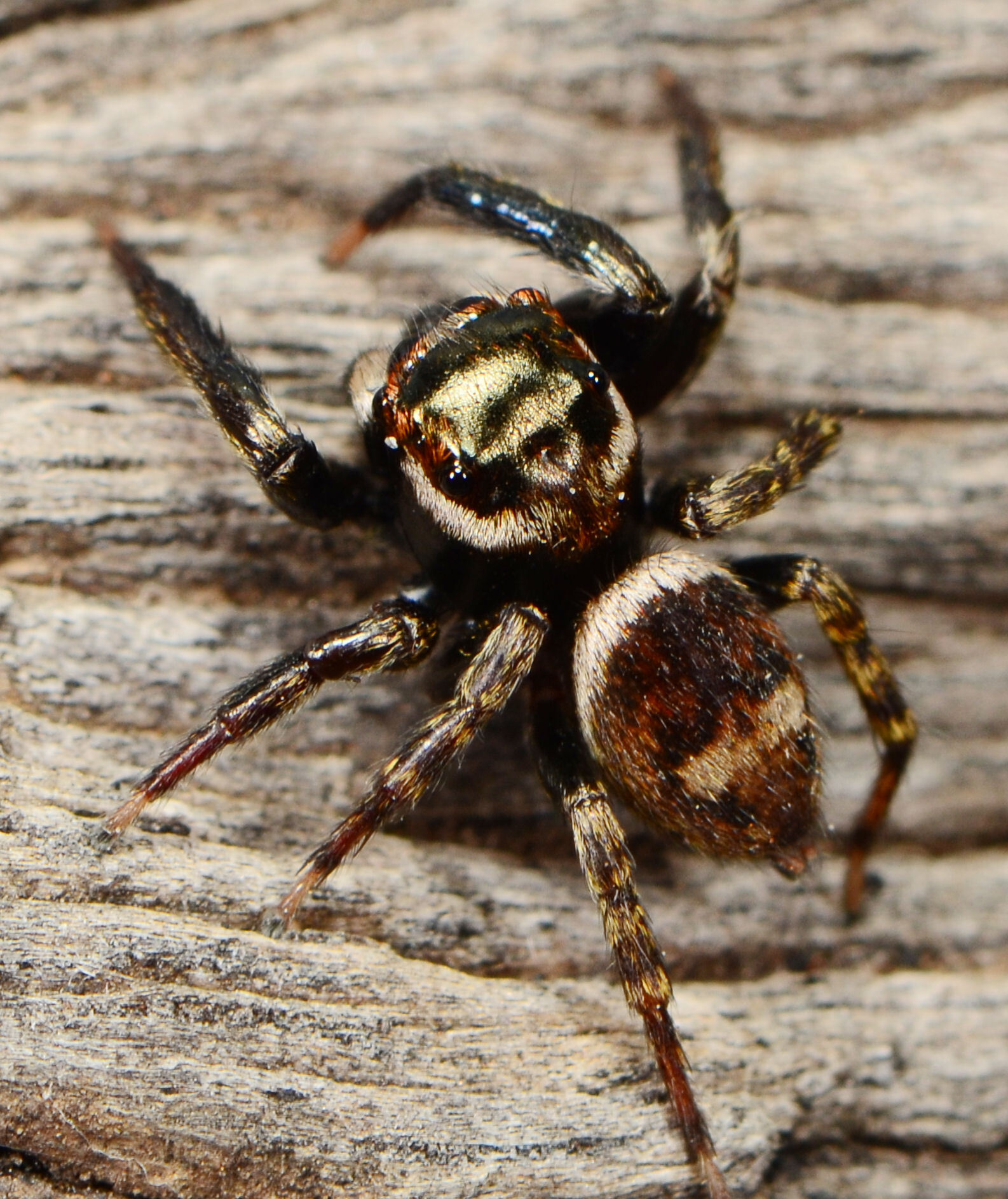
- male

Conservation status
- Least Concern (IUCN 3.1)

Scientific classification
- Kingdom: Animalia
- Phylum: Arthropoda
- Subphylum: Chelicerata
- Class: Arachnida
- Order: Araneae
- Infraorder: Araneomorphae
- Family: Salticidae
- Genus: Hasarius
- Species: H. adansoni

Binomial name
- Hasarius adansoni (Audouin, 1826)

Synonyms
- List of synonyms: Attus adansonii Audouin, 1826; Attus tardigradus Audouin, 1826; Attus forskaeli Walckenaer, 1837; Attus capito Lucas, 1838; Salticus oraniensis Lucas, 1846; Salticus striatus Lucas, 1853; Salticus ruficapillus Doleschall, 1859; Salticus citus O. Pickard-Cambridge, 1863; Plexippa nigrofusca Simon, 1864; Plexippus adansoni Simon, 1868; Eris niveipalpis Gerstaecker, 1873; Salticus scabellatus Butler, 1876; Plexippus ardelio Thorell, 1877; Hasarius citus O. Pickard-Cambridge, 1878; Euophrys nigriceps Taczanowski, 1878; Jotus albocircumdatus L. Koch, 1881; Hasarius garetti Keyserling, 1881; Ergane signata Keyserling, 1890; Hasarius adansonii Thorell, 1892; Cyrba picturata Karsch, in Lendl, 1898; Cyrene fusca F. O. Pickard-Cambridge, 1901; Hasarius albocircumdatus Simon, 1903; Sidusa borealis Banks, 1904; Evarcha longipalpis Bösenberg & Strand, 1906; Phiale fusca Petrunkevitch, 1911; Tachyskarthmos annamensis Hogg, 1922; Nebridia borealis Kaston, 1945; Jacobia brauni Schmidt, 1956; Vitia albipalpis Marples, 1957; Tachyscarthmus annamensis Bonnet, 1959; Habrocestum chikhaldarensis Rao, Bodkhe & Kanaujia, 2025

= Hasarius adansoni =

Species of spider

Hasarius adansoni, known commonly as Adanson's house jumper, is a species of jumping spider that is common in warm regions around the world, often associated with people.

== Distribution ==
H. adansoni is found in warmer climates around the world, for example Malta, India, Japan, Brazil, Taiwan, Tanzania, and Australia. It has also been introduced worldwide in greenhouses and similar places, for example in several German zoos. In China it is distributed in the provinces of Gansu, Guangxi, Guangdong and Yunnan.

== Behavior ==
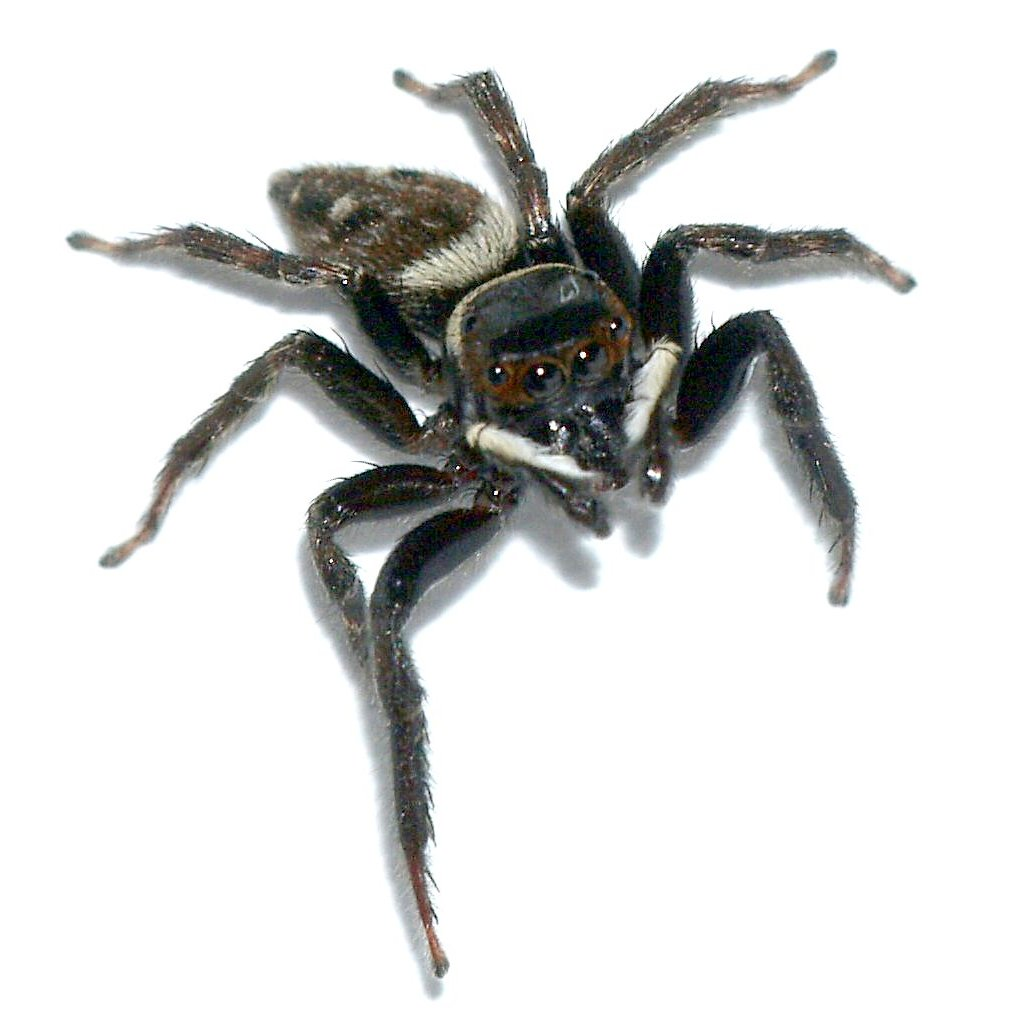
Male

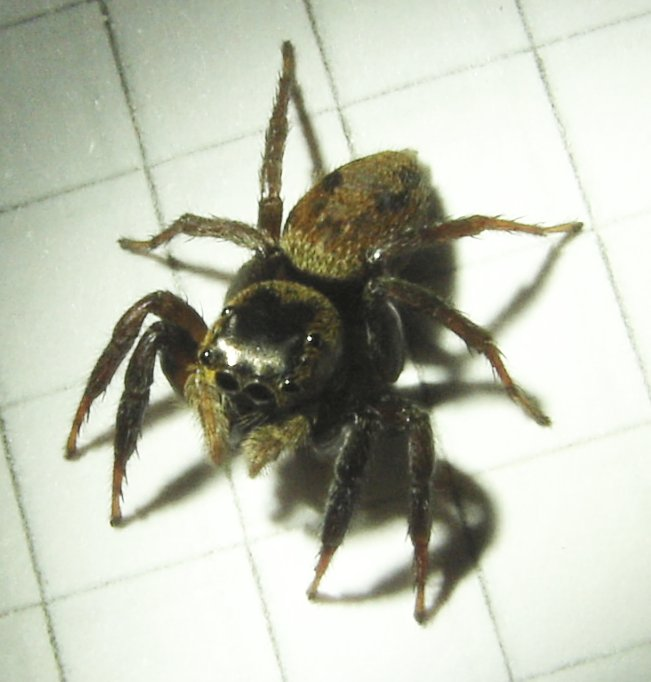
Female

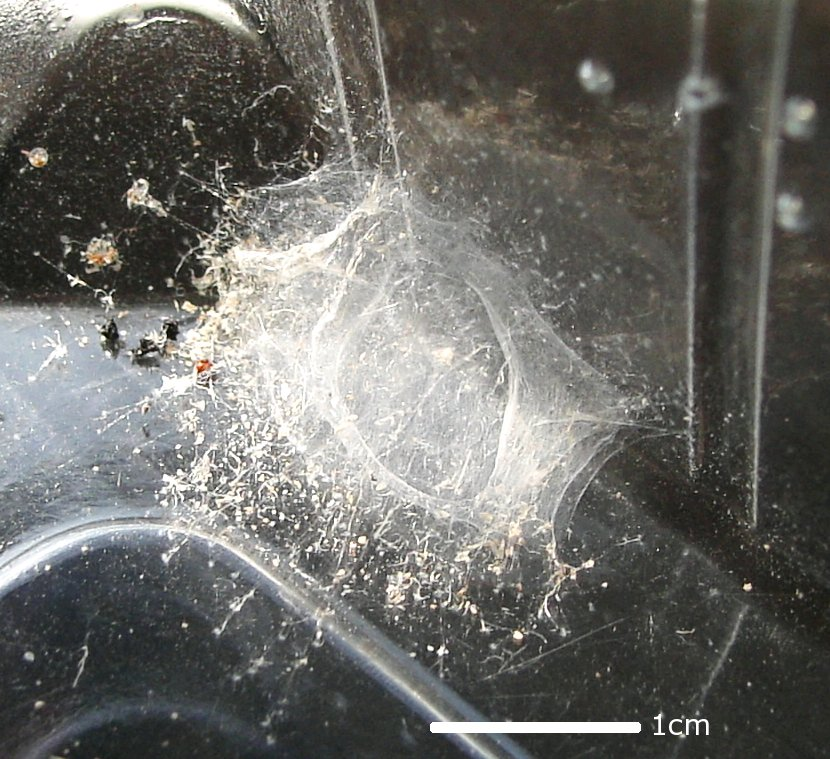
Retreat

These spiders build a silken retreat at night, which is about twice the length of the animal. Although the same retreat is sometimes reused, others are built in the vicinity.

Males have been seen to feed on immature females, although this may be by accident.

== Description ==
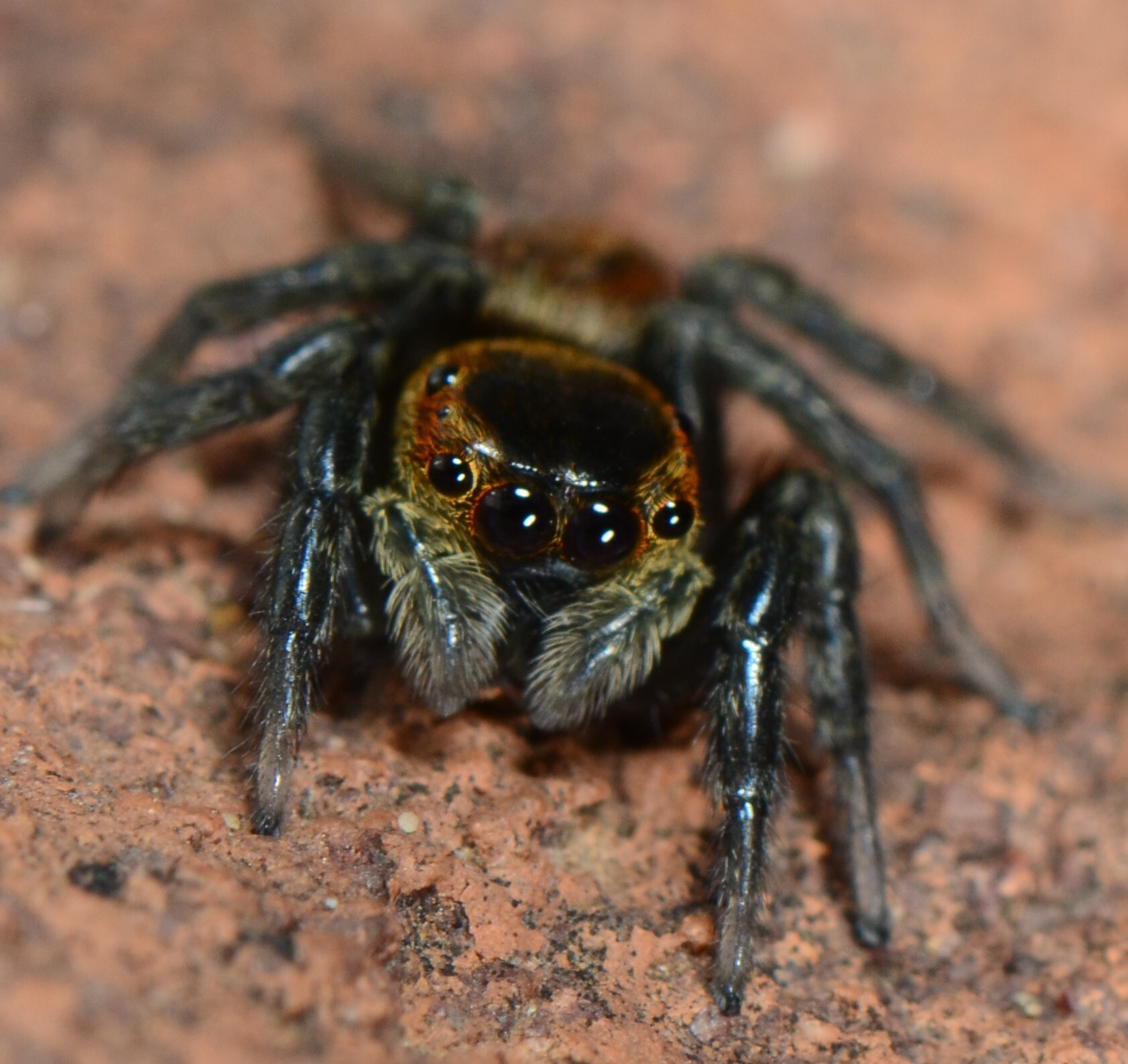
female

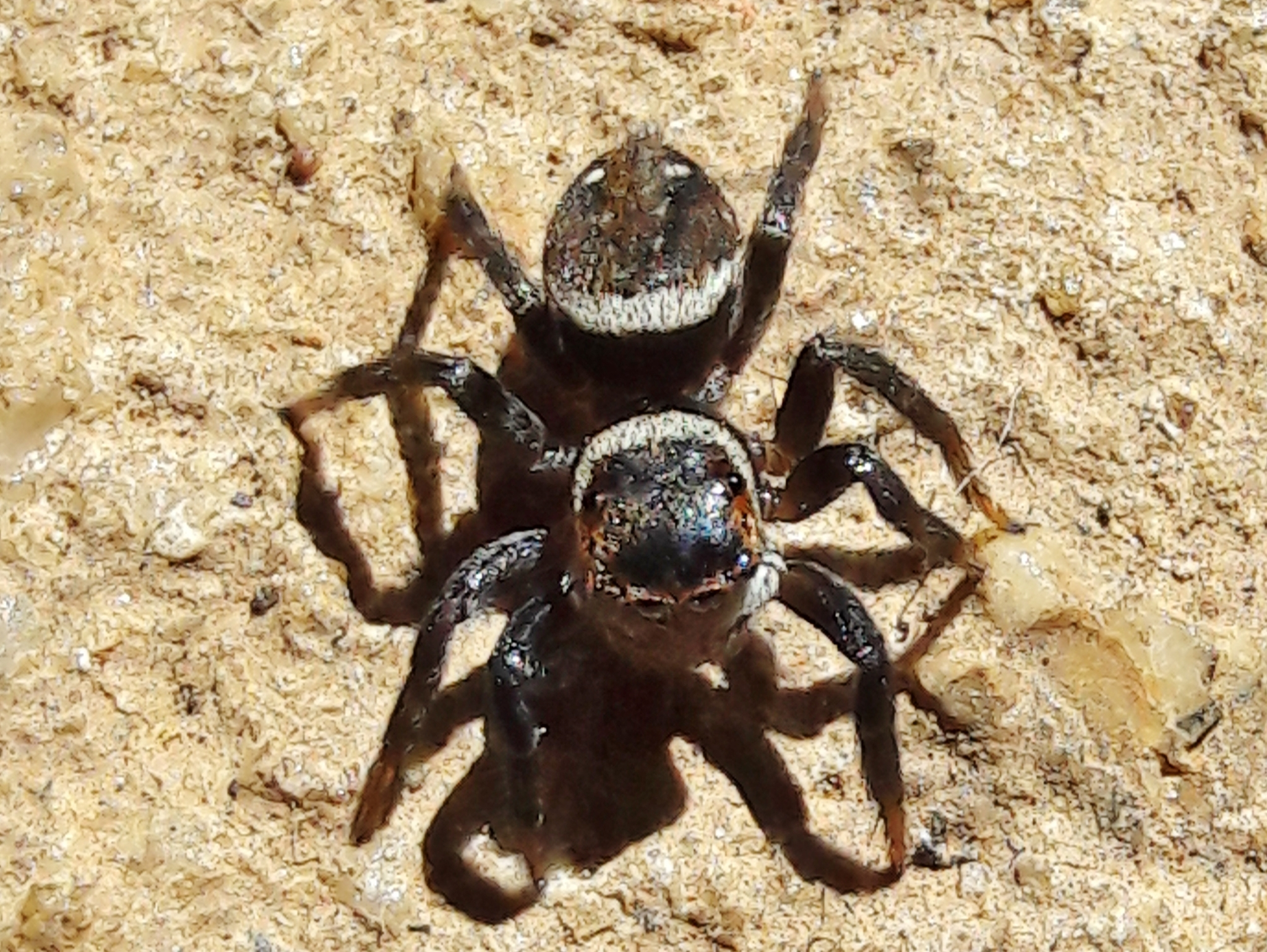
male

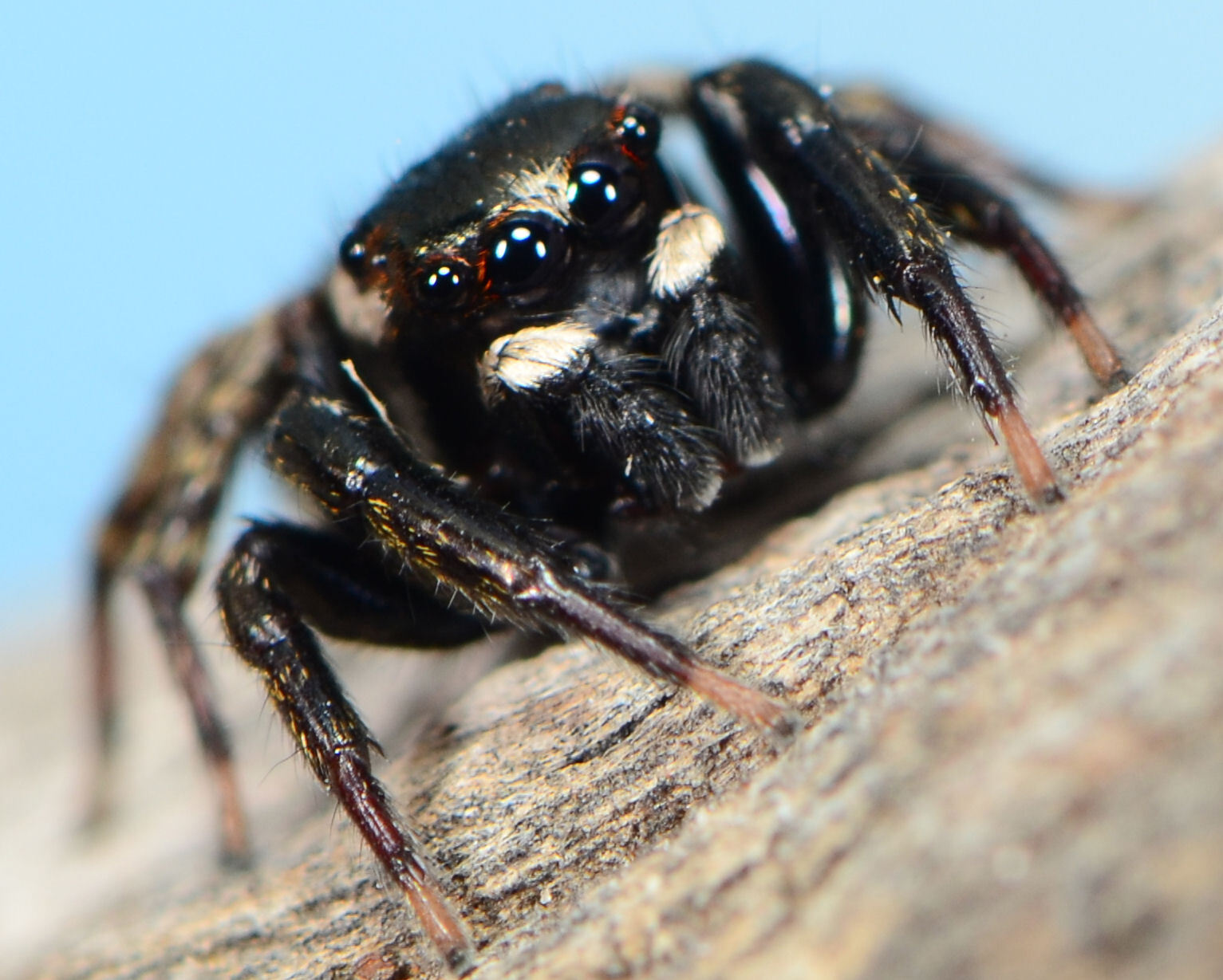
male

Females grow up to 8 millimeters in length, males up to 6 millimeters.

The males are mostly black, with a red "mask" and pedipalps that are partly white. A white crescent is present on the back part of the abdomen, and another one on the front part of the opisthosoma. There are two small white dots on the posterior back, and two even smaller ones towards the end. These white areas - especially on the pedipalps - have a nacre-like iridescence.

Females are dark brown, with a lighter and somewhat rufous opisthosoma.

== Nomenclature ==
This species was originally described as Attus adansonii by Audouin in 1826, then redescribed in officially recognised literature another 86 times by 2012, often being placed in other genera. The first placement into Hasarius was made by the French arachnologist Eugène Simon in 1871.

The species is named after the French naturalist Michel Adanson.
