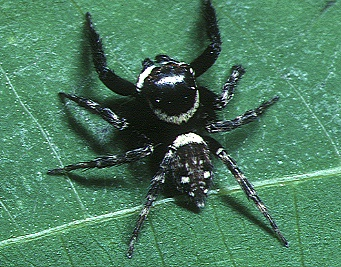
- Male Hasarius adansoni

Scientific classification
- Kingdom: Animalia
- Phylum: Arthropoda
- Subphylum: Chelicerata
- Class: Arachnida
- Order: Araneae
- Infraorder: Araneomorphae
- Family: Salticidae
- Subfamily: Salticinae
- Genus: Hasarius; Simon, 1871

Type species
- Attus adansoni Audouin, 1826

Species
- See text.

Diversity
- 32 species

= Hasarius =

Genus of spiders

Hasarius is a spider genus of the family Salticidae (jumping spiders).

== Species ==
As of October 2025, this genus includes 32 species:

- Hasarius adansoni (Audouin, 1826) – Africa, Middle East. Introduced to both Americas, St. Helena, Europe, India, Laos, Vietnam, China, Taiwan, Japan, Australia, Pacific Islands (type species)
- Hasarius bellicosus G. W. Peckham & E. G. Peckham, 1896 – Guatemala
- Hasarius cheliceroides Borowiec & Wesołowska, 2002 – Cameroon
- Hasarius dalatensis Logunov, 2024 – Vietnam
- Hasarius egaenus Thorell, 1895 – Myanmar
- Hasarius elisabethae Thorell, 1890 – Indonesia (Sumatra)
- Hasarius firmus Wiśniewski & Wesołowska, 2013 – Cameroon
- Hasarius glaucus Hogg, 1915 – New Guinea
- Hasarius inhebes Karsch, 1879 – Angola
- Hasarius inhonestus Keyserling, 1881 – Australia (New South Wales)
- Hasarius insignis Simon, 1886 – Comoros
- Hasarius insularis Wesołowska & van Harten, 2002 – Yemen (Socotra)
- Hasarius kjellerupi Thorell, 1891 – India (Nicobar Is.)
- Hasarius kulczynskii Żabka, 1985 – Vietnam
- Hasarius kweilinensis (Prószyński, 1992) – China
- Hasarius lisei Bauab-Vianna & Soares, 1982 – Brazil
- Hasarius mahensis Wanless, 1984 – Seychelles
- Hasarius mulciber Keyserling, 1881 – Australia (Queensland)
- Hasarius mumbai Joshi & Tripathi, 2023 – India
- Hasarius obscurus Keyserling, 1881 – Australia (New South Wales)
- Hasarius orientalis (Żabka, 1985) – Vietnam
- Hasarius pauciaculeis Caporiacco, 1941 – Ethiopia
- Hasarius peckhami Petrunkevitch, 1914 – Dominican Rep.
- Hasarius raychaudhurii Biswas, 2017 – Bangladesh
- Hasarius rufociliatus Simon, 1898 – Seychelles
- Hasarius rusticus Thorell, 1887 – Myanmar
- Hasarius scylax Thorell, 1892 – Indonesia (Sumatra)
- Hasarius sulfuratus Thorell, 1891 – Indonesia (Sumatra)
- Hasarius testaceus (Thorell, 1877) – Indonesia (Sulawesi)
- Hasarius trivialis (Thorell, 1877) – Indonesia (Sulawesi)
- Hasarius tropicus Jastrzebski, 2010 – Bhutan
- Hasarius workmani Thorell, 1892 – Indonesia (Sumatra)

H. neocaledonicus was removed from Hasarius in 2008 and put in its own genus, Rhondes.
