= Hyllus (disambiguation) =

Hyllus is the son of Heracles and Deianira in Greek mythology

Hyllus may also refer to:

- Hyllus (mythology), other figures in Greek mythology
- Hyllus (river), a river in Asia minor
- Hyllus (spider), a genus of spiders
