= Hyllos =

Hyllos may refer to:

- Hyllus (river), a river in Asia Minor
- Hyllus (spider), a genus of jumping spiders
- In Greek mythology, Hyllus (Ὕλλος), the son of Heracles and Deianira, husband of Iole
