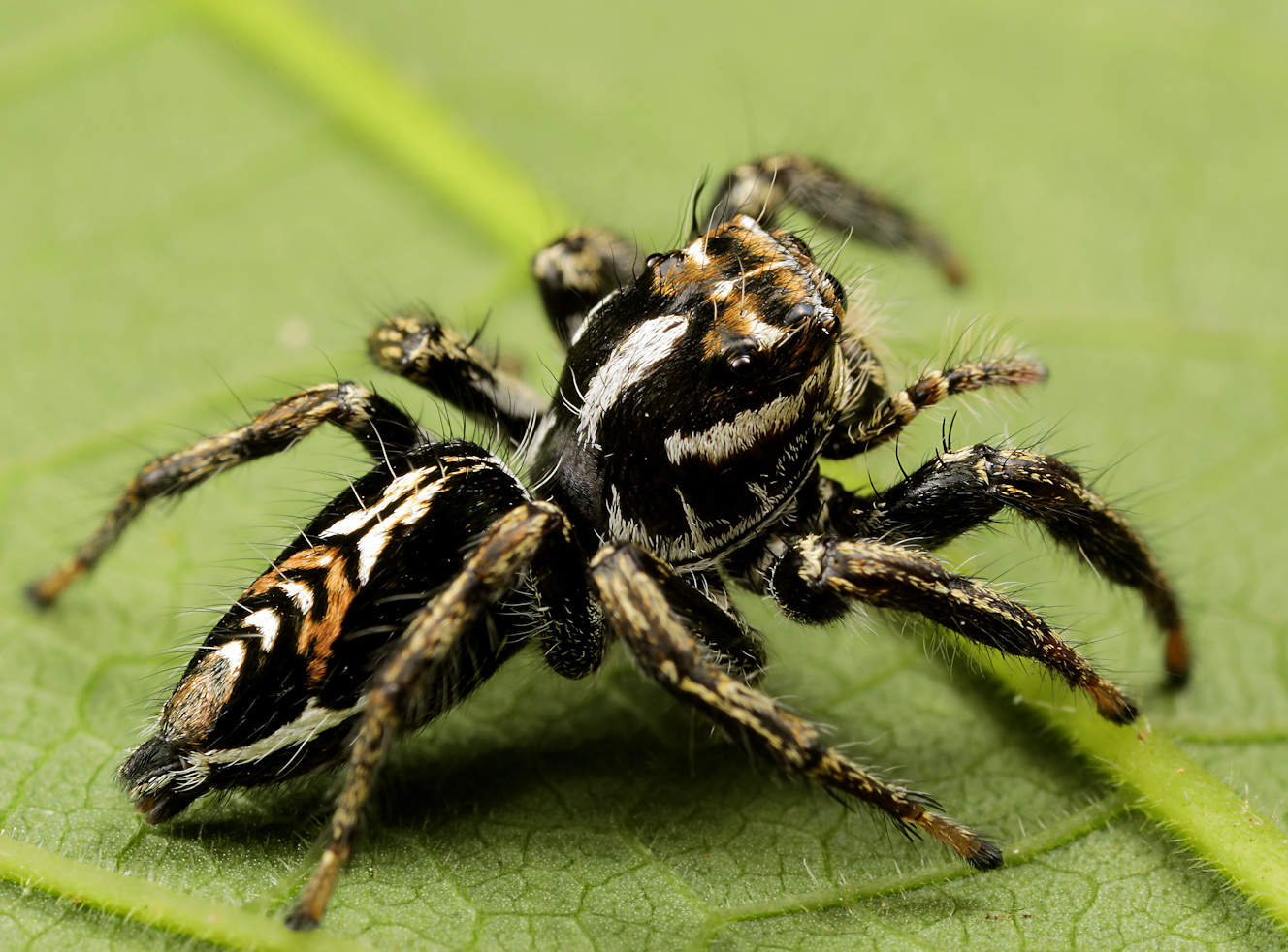
- A related species, Hyllus argyrotoxus

Scientific classification
- Kingdom: Animalia
- Phylum: Arthropoda
- Subphylum: Chelicerata
- Class: Arachnida
- Order: Araneae
- Infraorder: Araneomorphae
- Family: Salticidae
- Genus: Hyllus
- Species: H. ramadanii

Binomial name
- Hyllus ramadanii Wesołowska & Russell-Smith, 2000

= Hyllus ramadanii =

Species of spider

Hyllus ramadanii is a species of jumping spider in the genus Hyllus that is endemic to Tanzania. It lives in rocky environments. The spider was first described in 2000 by Wanda Wesołowska and Anthony Russell-Smith. The spider is medium-sized, with a brown carapace between 3.1 and 3.2 mm (0.12 and 0.13 in) long and an abdomen 3.2 and 5.0 mm (0.13 and 0.20 in) long. The female is larger than the male. It can be differentiated from other species in the genus by its coloration and copulatory organs. The male has a pattern of three white patches on its carapace and a horseshoe shape on its abdomen. The female has three irregular orange streaks on its carapace and a yellow pattern that looks like a tree on its abdomen.

== Taxonomy ==
Hyllus ramadanii is a jumping spider that was first described by Wanda Wesołowska and Anthony Russell-Smith in 2000. It is one of over 500 species identified by the Polish arachnologist Wesołowska. The species is named in honour of the Tanzanian zoologist Ramadani Makusi. It was allocated to the genus Hyllus, first circumscribed by Carl Ludwig Koch in 1846, on the basis of its coloration, although Wesołowska and Russell-Smith noted that there is a wide diversity amongst Hyllus species and their diagnosis was not conclusive. The genus is similar to Evarcha, differing in size. Molecular analysis confirms that they are related but the precise relationship between the genera is unknown and species from one genus are sometimes misidentified as members of the other. The genus is found throughout Africa and contains one of the largest jumping spiders discovered.

In Wayne Maddison's 2015 study of spider phylogenetic classification, the genus Hyllus was placed in the clade Saltafresia. He considered that it a member of the subtribe Plexippina in the tribe Plexippini. Two years later, in 2017, Jerzy Prószyński grouped the genus with nine other genera of jumping spiders under the name Hyllines, which was named after the genus. He used the shape of the embolus as a distinguishing sign for the group. Hyllines was itself tentatively placed within a supergroup named Hylloida, again named after the genus.

== Description ==
The spider is medium-sized and can be differentiated from others in the genus by its coloration and the structure of the copulatory organs. The male has a round brown carapace that is typically 3.1 mm (0.12 in) long and 2.3 mm (0.091 in) wide. It is covered in brown hairs apart from three pale white patches that have white hairs. There are also white arch-like stripes along the sides. The clypeus also has a covering of white hairs. The eye field is black. The chelicerae are brown, with two teeth visible at the front and one to the rear. The labium and maxillae are brown with yellowish margins. The abdomen is also brown and typically 3.2 mm (0.13 in) long and 1.7 mm (0.067 in) wide. It is also more elongated in shape, covered in long thin hairs and has a white horseshoe-shaped pattern on its back. The underside is light yellow. The legs are light brown, and have long brown hairs. The spinnerets are beige. The pedipalps are brown, with the base covered in white hairs. The embolus is long and thin and the tibial apophysis is short, wide and stumpy.

The female is larger than the male, with a carapace that is typically 3.2 mm (0.13 in) long and 2.5 mm (0.098 in) wide and a much larger abdomen typically 5.0 mm (0.20 in) long and 2.8 mm (0.11 in) wide. The female has a brown thorax with a pattern of three irregular orange streaks and a dark brown eye field. The clypeus is low and brown. The abdomen is fawn on top with a yellowish pattern reminiscent of a Christmas tree and light underneath with a design made of three brown lines across it. The spinnerets are beige and legs orange. The palpal bulb is light. The spider has a large round epigyne that has two large oval depressions and a wide pocket near the epigastric furrow. It has relatively long seminal ducts that lead to spermathecae that are composed of two spherical chambers.

== Distribution and habitat ==
The species is endemic to Tanzania. The holotype was found in the Mkomazi National Park in 1996. It thrives in rocky environments.
