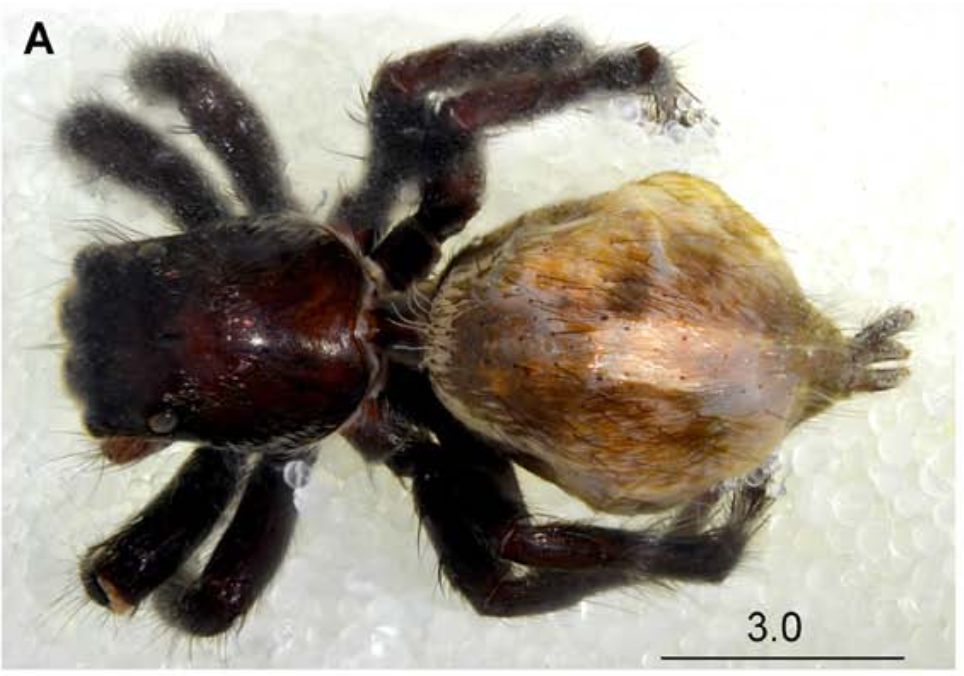
- Adult female from Ivory Coast

Scientific classification
- Kingdom: Animalia
- Phylum: Arthropoda
- Subphylum: Chelicerata
- Class: Arachnida
- Order: Araneae
- Infraorder: Araneomorphae
- Family: Salticidae
- Genus: Hyllus
- Species: H. ignotus

Binomial name
- Hyllus ignotus Wesołowska & Russell-Smith, 2022

= Hyllus ignotus =

Species of jumping spider

Hyllus ignotus is a species of jumping spider in the genus Hyllus that is endemic to Ivory Coast. The female of the species was first described in 2022 by Wanda Wesołowska and Anthony Russell-Smith. The male has not been identified. It is large, with a carapace typically 3.7 mm (0.15 in) long and an abdomen 5.3 mm (0.21 in) long. The spider is brown and with a white pattern on the back of the abdomen. Its epigyne has two pockets that stretch down the middle of its length and copulatory openings that are close together.

== Taxonomy ==
Hyllus ignotus is a jumping spider, a member of the family Salticidae, that was first described by the arachnologists Wanda Wesołowska and Anthony Russell-Smith in 2022. It is one of over 500 species identified by Wesołowska. The species name is a Latin word that means unknown. It was allocated to the genus Hyllus, first raised by Carl Ludwig Koch in 1846. The genus is similar to Evarcha, differing in size. Molecular analysis confirms that they are related but the precise relationship between the genera is unknown and species from one genus are sometimes misidentified as members of the other. The genus is found throughout Africa and contains one of the largest jumping spiders discovered.

In Wayne Maddison's 2015 study of spider phylogenetic classification, the genus Hyllus was placed in the clade Saltafresia. He considered that it a member of the subtribe Plexippina in the tribe Plexippini. Two years later, in 2017, Jerzy Prószyński grouped the genus with nine other genera of jumping spiders under the name Hyllines, which was named after the genus. He used the shape of the embolus as a distinguishing sign for the group. Hyllines was itself tentatively placed within a supergroup named Hylloida, again named after the genus.

== Description ==
The spider is large. The female has a round brown cephalothorax that is typically 3.7 mm (0.15 in) long and 3.0 mm (0.12 in) wide. It has a large dark brown carapace that has long brown bristles alongside the eyes and two thin white lines beneath the eyes. The chelicerae are brown. The abdomen is more swollen in shape and lighter brown, typically 5.3 mm (0.21 in) long and 3.0 mm (0.12 in) wide. It has a white streak in the middle on the top and bristles around the edges. The underside is dark brown. The legs are black and hairy. The spinnerets are blackish. The epigyne has two pockets that stretch down the middle of its length. The copulatory openings are close together and lead to simple spermathecae. The male has not been described.

== Distribution ==
Hyllus ignotus is endemic to Ivory Coast. The male holotype was found in Lamto in Bandama Forest in 1975.
