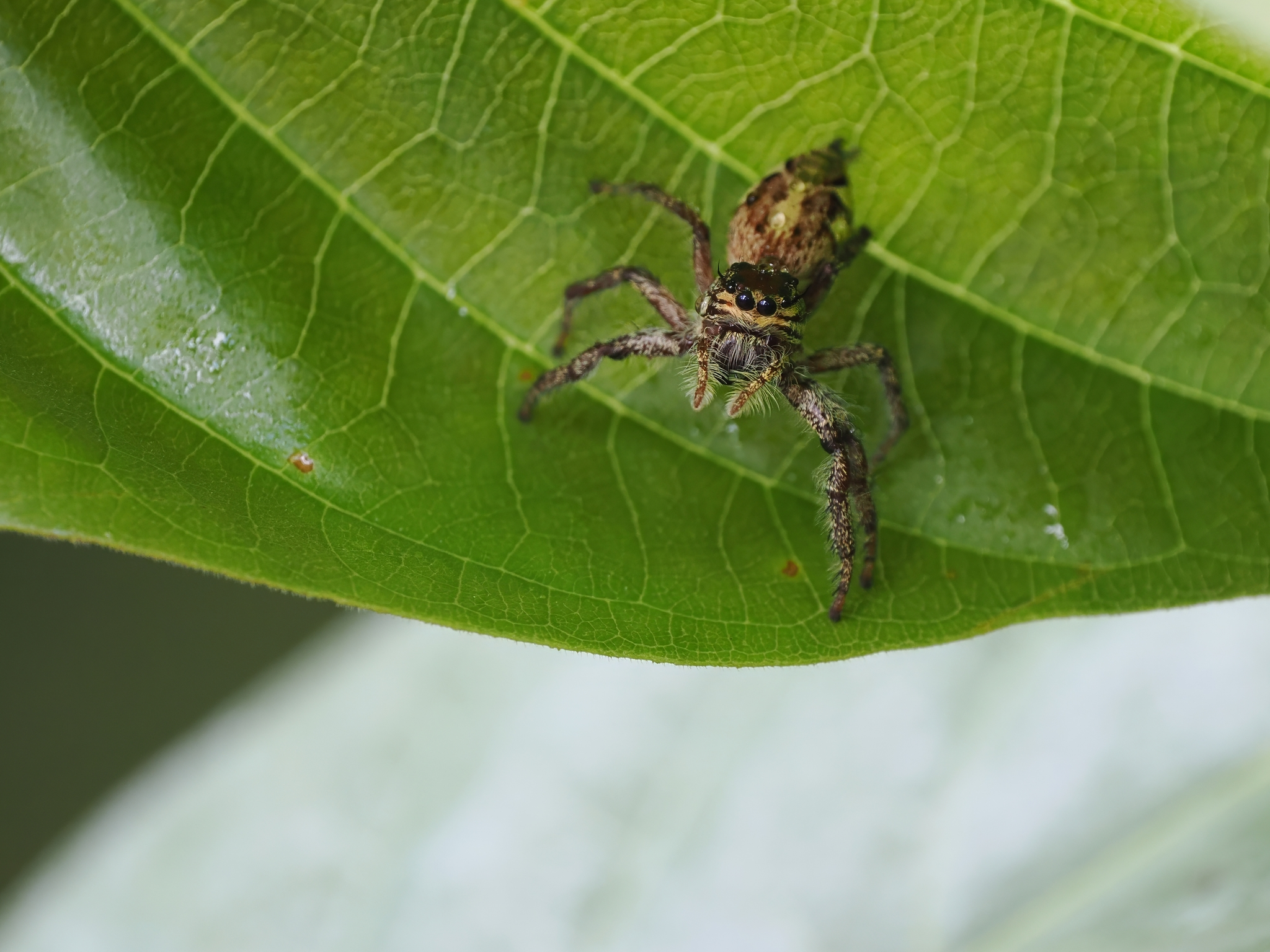
- female from Indonesia
- Drawing of Male by CL Koch 1846

Scientific classification
- Kingdom: Animalia
- Phylum: Arthropoda
- Subphylum: Chelicerata
- Class: Arachnida
- Order: Araneae
- Infraorder: Araneomorphae
- Family: Salticidae
- Genus: Hyllus
- Species: H. giganteus

Binomial name
- Hyllus giganteus Koch, 1846

= Hyllus giganteus =

Giant Jumping Spider

Species of spider

Hyllus giganteus, commonly referred to as the giant jumping spider, is a jumping spider found throughout Southeast Asia. This species is recognized as one of the largest jumping spiders known to science, ranging from 1.8–2.5 centimetres (0.71–0.98 in) in length.

== Discovery ==
The giant jumping spider was first discovered in 1846 by German arachnologist Carl Ludwig Koch and was first mentioned in his cowritten book The arachnids: Depicted and described true to nature.

== Description ==
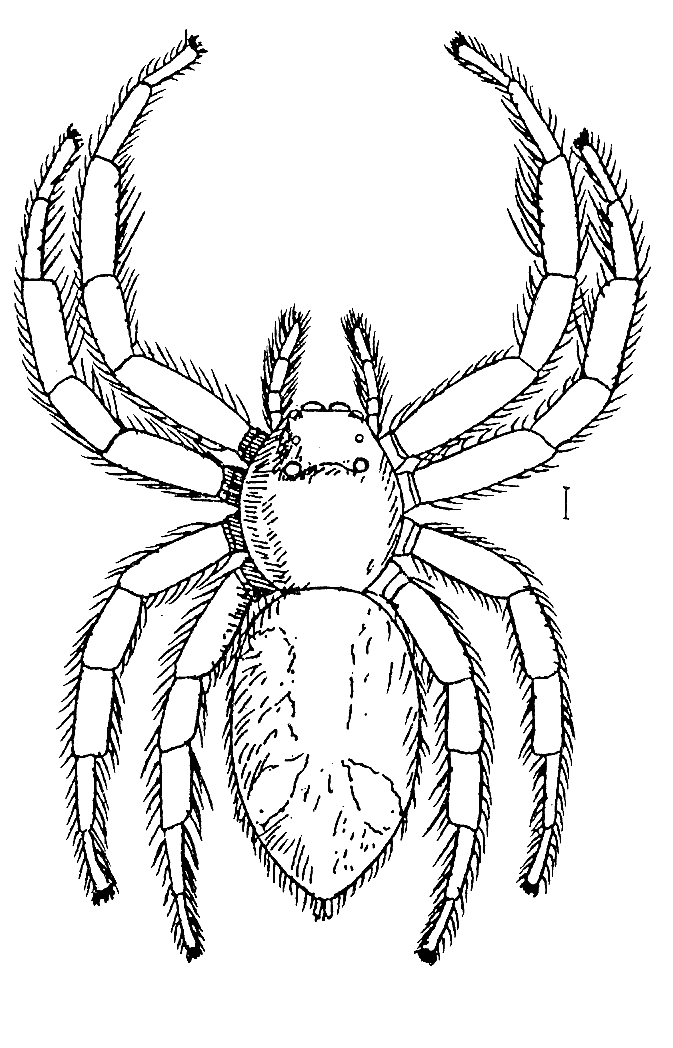
Male from Workman, 1896. Specimen from Sulawesi.

Hyllus giganteus is often confused for other species, especially Hyllus diardi.Females can be distinguished by their distinctive stripes at the front around their “face”, and black band across the carapace. They also have a mottled abdomen, with different shades of brown and beige. Males mature darker in colour, with less setae and longer appendages. The males also have long chelicerae which point in opposite directions, similar to that of Hyllus walckenaeri.

== Venom ==
Like most spiders, Hyllus giganteus has venom, but is not harmful to people.
