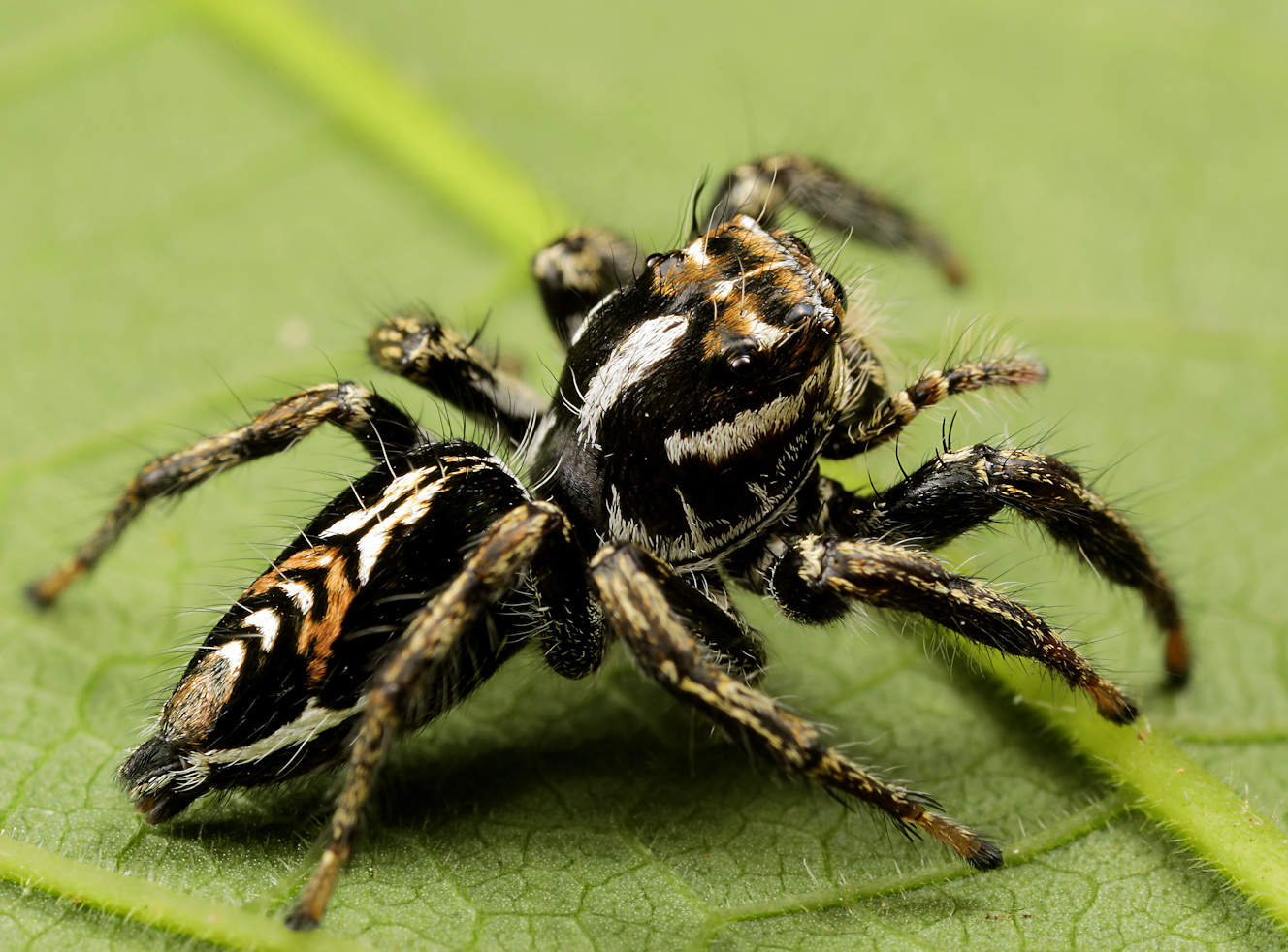
- A related species, Hyllus argyrotoxus

Scientific classification
- Kingdom: Animalia
- Phylum: Arthropoda
- Subphylum: Chelicerata
- Class: Arachnida
- Order: Araneae
- Infraorder: Araneomorphae
- Family: Salticidae
- Genus: Hyllus
- Species: H. rotundithorax

Binomial name
- Hyllus rotundithorax Wesołowska & Russell-Smith, 2000

= Hyllus rotundithorax =

Species of spider

Hyllus rotundithorax is a species of jumping spider in the genus Hyllus that is endemic to Tanzania. It lives near rivers. The spider was first described in 2000 by Wanda Wesołowska and Anthony Russell-Smith. The spider is large, with a brown carapace 5.8 mm (0.23 in) long and an abdomen 6.8 mm (0.27 in) long. The species has a distinctive rounded thorax, after which it is named, and a long thin embolus. Only the male has been identified.

== Taxonomy ==
Hyllus rotundithorax is a jumping spider that was first described by Wanda Wesołowska and Anthony Russell-Smith in 2000. It is one of over 500 species identified by the Polish arachnologist Wesołowska. The species name is derived from two Latin words that describe the shape of the spider. It was the allocated to the genus Hyllus, which had been first raised by Carl Ludwig Koch in 1846. The genus is similar to Evarcha, differing in size. The precise relationship between the genera is unknown but molecular analysis confirms that they are closely related and species from one genus are sometimes misidentified as members of the other. The genus is found throughout Africa and contains one of the largest jumping spiders discovered.

In Wayne Maddison's 2015 study of spider phylogenetic classification, the genus Hyllus was placed in the clade Saltafresia. He considered it a member of the subtribe Plexippina in the tribe Plexippini. Two years later, in 2017, Jerzy Prószyński grouped the genus with nine other genera of jumping spiders under the name Hyllines, which was named after the genus. He used the shape of the embolus as a distinguishing sign for the group. Hyllines was itself tentatively placed within a supergroup named Hylloida, again named after the genus.

== Description ==
The spider is large. The male has a round dark brown carapace that is typically 5.8 mm (0.23 in) long and 5.1 mm (0.20 in) wide. It is covered in short grey-russet hairs and has dark lines that radiate from the fovea. The clypeus is low and has a covering of white hairs. The chelicerae are dark brown, with two teeth visible at the front and one to the rear. The maxillae are dark brown and have two processes on the outside edge. The abdomen is lighter than the carapace with a reddish tinge, and typically 6.8 mm (0.27 in) long and 3.9 mm (0.15 in) wide. It is also more elongated in shape, covered in light hairs and has a trapezium pattern formed of four hollow dots. The underside is dark brown. The legs are also dark brown, and have dense grey or brown hairs. The spinnerets are dark as are the small pedipalps. The embolus is long and thin. The tibial apophysis is distinctive in having an additional tooth at its base and serrated tip. The female has not been described.

The spider can be differentiated by the rounded shape of the carapace, recalled in the species name, and the structure of the copulatory organs. It mostly closely resembles Hyllus semicupreus, although this species has a shorter embolus.

== Distribution and habitat ==
The species is endemic to Tanzania. The holotype was found near the Umba River in the Mkomazi National Park in 1995. It thrives in environments near rivers.
