= Hyllus nigeriensis =

Scientific classification
- Kingdom: Animalia
- Phylum: Arthropoda
- Subphylum: Chelicerata
- Class: Arachnida
- Order: Araneae
- Infraorder: Araneomorphae
- Family: Salticidae
- Genus: Hyllus
- Species: H. nigeriensis

Binomial name
- Hyllus nigeriensis (Wesołowska & Edwards, 2012)

Species of spider

Hyllus nigeriensis is a species of jumping spider in the genus Hyllus that is endemic to Nigeria. It lives in rainforest. The spider was first described in 2012 by Wanda Wesołowska and G. B. Edwards. A medium-sized spider, it typically has a cephalothorax 4.1 mm (0.16 in) long and an abdomen 4.0 mm (0.16 in) long. The abdomen is reddish-brown and narrower than the light brown carapace. Originally tentatively allocated to the genus Brancus, the species was allocated to Hyllus in 2022. Only the female has been described.

== Taxonomy ==
Hyllus nigeriensis is a jumping spider that was first described by Wanda Wesołowska and Glavis B. Edwards in 2012. It is one of over 500 species identified by the Polish arachnologist Wesołowska. They originally tentatively allocated it to the genus Brancus based on its body shape. The genus had been first circumscribed by Eugène Simon in 1902, and contained spiders that had a distinctive body shape, with a slightly pear-shaped carapace and an elongated narrow abdomen. In their comprehensive revision of the genus in 2022, Wesołowska and Anthony Russell-Smith transferred the species to Hyllus. The genus, first raised by Carl Ludwig Koch in 1846, is similar to Evarcha, differing in size. Molecular analysis confirms that they are related but the precise relationship between the genera is unknown and species from one genus are sometimes misidentified as members of the other.

The genus Hyllus is found throughout Africa and contains one of the largest jumping spiders discovered. In Wayne Maddison's 2015 study of spider phylogenetic classification, the genus Hyllus was placed in the clade Saltafresia. He considered that it a member of the subtribe Plexippina in the tribe Plexippini. Two years later, in 2017, Jerzy Prószyński grouped the genus with nine other genera of jumping spiders under the name Hyllines, which was named after the genus. He used the shape of the embolus as a distinguishing sign for the group. Hyllines was itself tentatively placed within a supergroup named Hylloida, again named after the genus. The species is named for the country where it was first discovered.

== Description ==
The spider is medium-sized. The female has a cephalothorax that is typically 4.1 mm (0.16 in) long and 2.7 mm (0.11 in) wide. It has an oval light brown carapace that is slightly flattened and has a scattering of short brown hairs. The eye field is short and black, with transparent hairs and long brown bristles evident near the eyes themselves. The clypeus is very low. The chelicerae are light brown, with a single tooth visible at the front. The sternum and mouthparts are orange. The abdomen is narrower than the carapace, typically 4.0 mm (0.16 in) long and 2.0 mm (0.079 in) wide. It is red brownish apart from a light serrated stripe down the middle and is covered in colourless hairs interspersed with some longer brown bristles. The underside is yellow with three blackish bands that converge at the dark grey spinnerets. The legs are yellowish-orange with brown hairs, the foremost pair being shorter than the others. The spider has an epigyne that has two oval depressions divided by a ridge and a shallow notch at the edge of the very rear. The internal structure of the epigyne is simple. It has relatively short seminal ducts that lead to thick-walled spermathecae and two widely spaced pockets. The male has not been identified.

== Distribution and habitat ==
The species is endemic to Nigeria. The holotype was found in the Cross Rivers State in 1980. It lives in rainforest.
