= Hyllus flavescens =

Natal Hyllus Jumping Spider

Scientific classification
- Kingdom: Animalia
- Phylum: Arthropoda
- Subphylum: Chelicerata
- Class: Arachnida
- Order: Araneae
- Infraorder: Araneomorphae
- Family: Salticidae
- Genus: Hyllus
- Species: H. flavescens

Binomial name
- Hyllus flavescens Simon, 1902

Species of spider

Hyllus flavescens is a species of spider in the family Salticidae. It is endemic to South Africa and is commonly known as the Natal Hyllus jumping spider.

== Distribution ==
Hyllus flavescens is known only from a male found in "Natal" (now the South African province KwaZulu-Natal).

== Habitat and ecology ==
The habitat and ecology of this species are unknown.

== Conservation ==
Hyllus flavescens is listed as Data Deficient by the South African National Biodiversity Institute. The status of the species remains obscure and more sampling is needed to collect the species and determine its range.

== Taxonomy ==
Hyllus flavescens was described by Eugène Simon in 1902. The species is known only from the male and has never been redescribed or illustrated.
