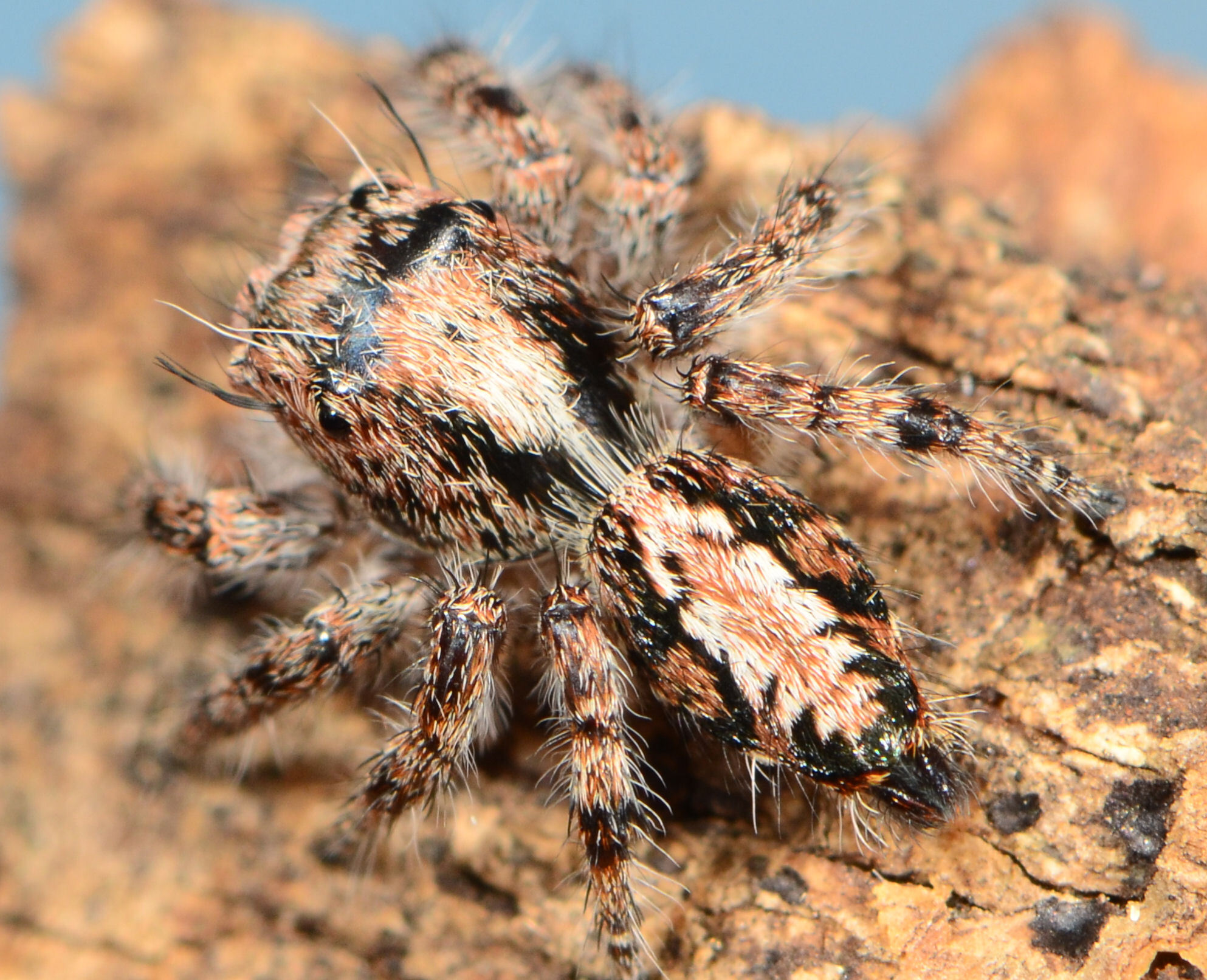
- female
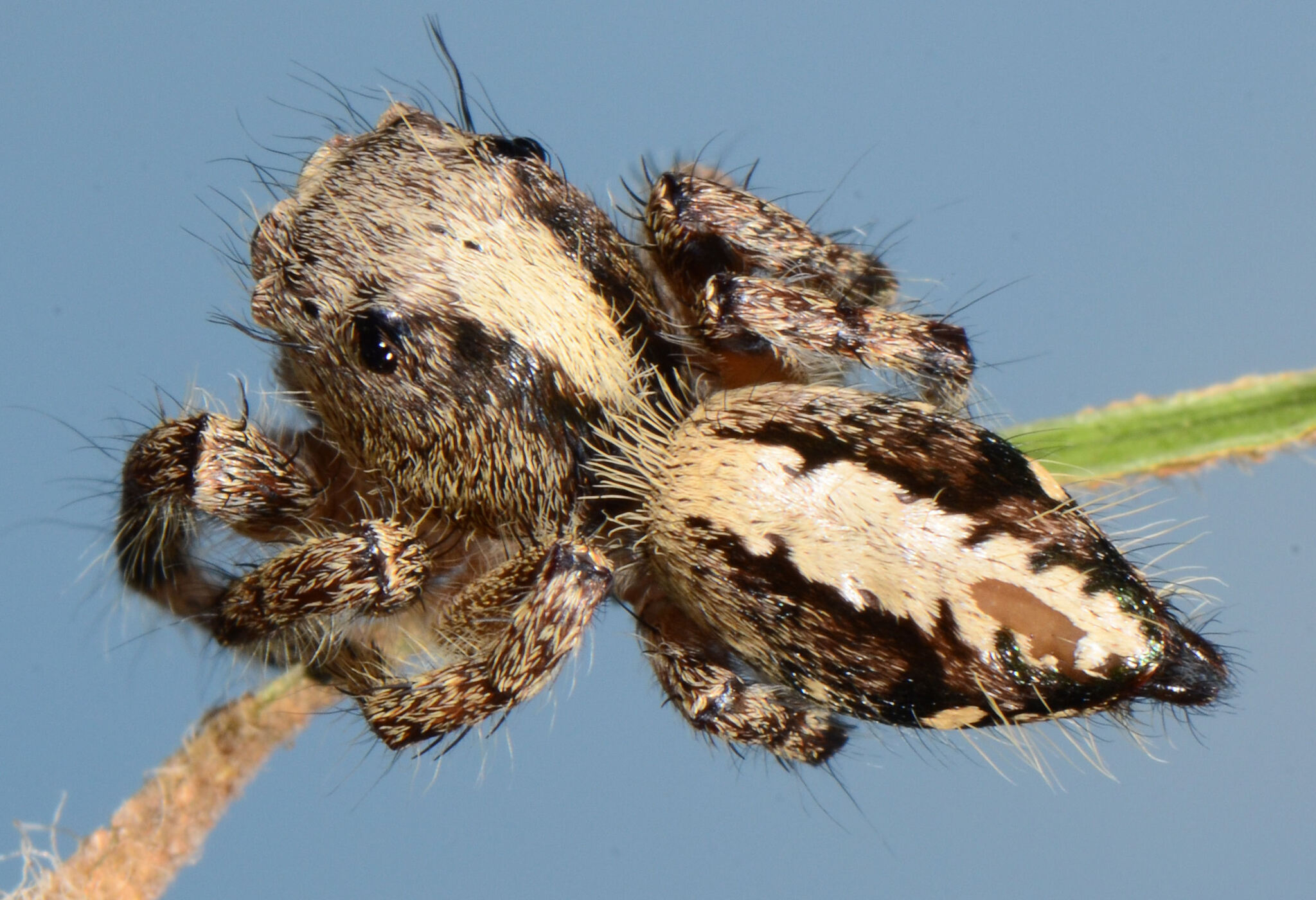
- juvenile male

Scientific classification
- Kingdom: Animalia
- Phylum: Arthropoda
- Subphylum: Chelicerata
- Class: Arachnida
- Order: Araneae
- Infraorder: Araneomorphae
- Family: Salticidae
- Genus: Hyllus
- Species: H. brevitarsis

Binomial name
- Hyllus brevitarsis Simon, 1902

Synonyms
- Hyllus natalii Peckham & Peckham, 1903; Hyllus rubrotinctus Strand, 1906; Hyllus natali Lessert, 1925; Hyllus natalensis Bonnet, 1957

= Hyllus brevitarsis =

Brown Hyllus Jumping Spider

Species of spider

Hyllus brevitarsis is a species of spider in the family Salticidae. It is found in Africa and is commonly known as the brown Hyllus jumping spider.

== Distribution ==
Hyllus brevitarsis is distributed across multiple African countries including Botswana, Ethiopia, Ivory Coast, Mozambique, Namibia, Somalia, South Africa, Tanzania and Zimbabwe.

In South Africa, the species has been recorded from Eastern Cape, Gauteng, KwaZulu-Natal, Limpopo, Mpumalanga and North West.

== Habitat and ecology ==
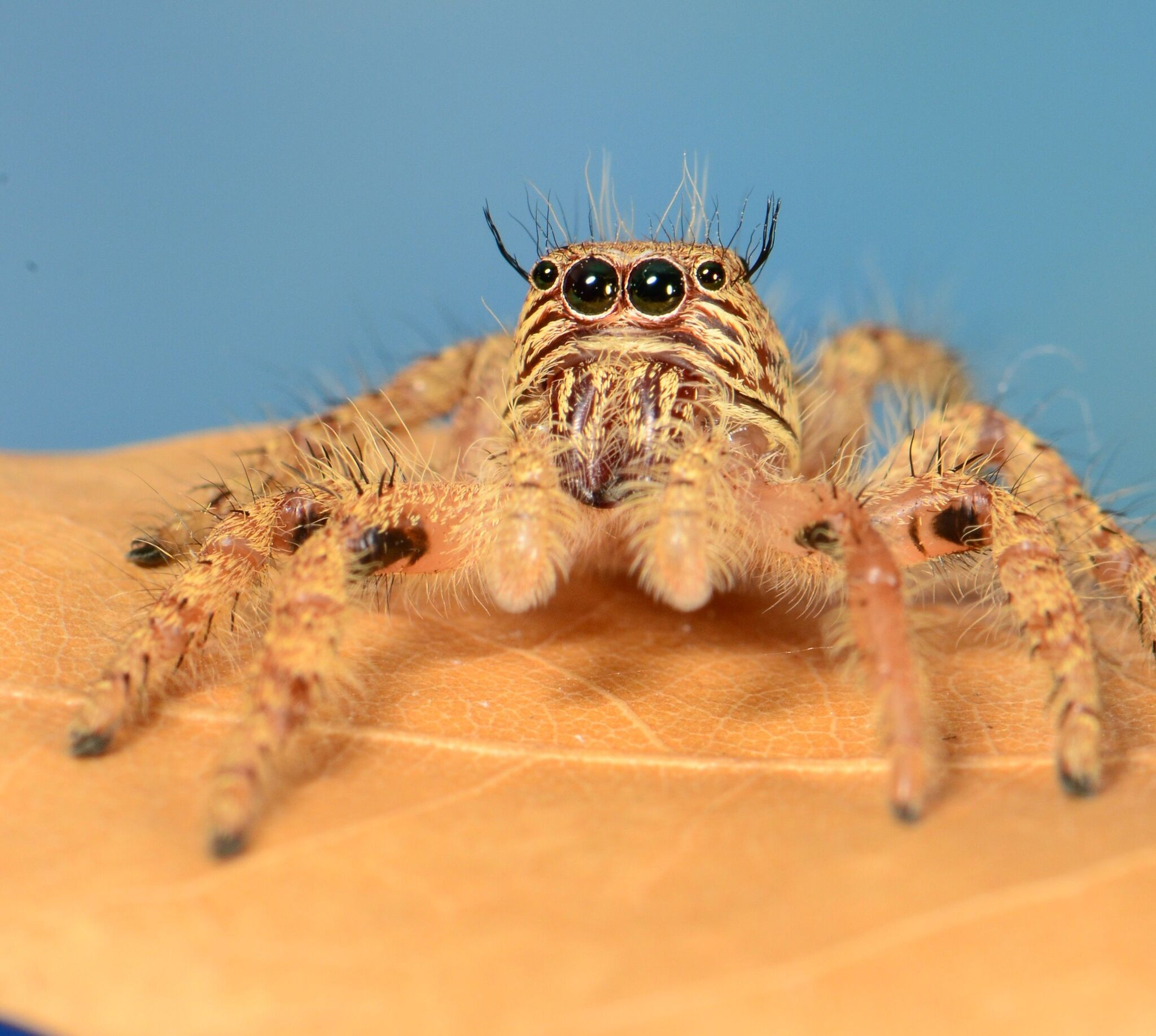
female

H. brevitarsis sits still and pressed against the substrate, resembling a honey bee both in size and in its striped orange and black abdomen. It has only been collected in late spring and summer.

In South Africa, Hyllus brevitarsis has been sampled from multiple biomes including Fynbos, Forest, Grassland, Indian Ocean Coastal Belt, Savanna and Thicket, at altitudes ranging from 7 to 1303 m. The species has also been sampled from avocado, lemon and macadamia orchards.

This medium-sized spider is occasionally collected by beating foliage of shrubs and trees in various savannah and floodplain habitats. Some specimens have been extracted from retreats constructed on the ventral side of leaves of Sansevieria hyacinthoides plants. One female was extracted from a silk retreat constructed in a grass inflorescence.

== Description ==
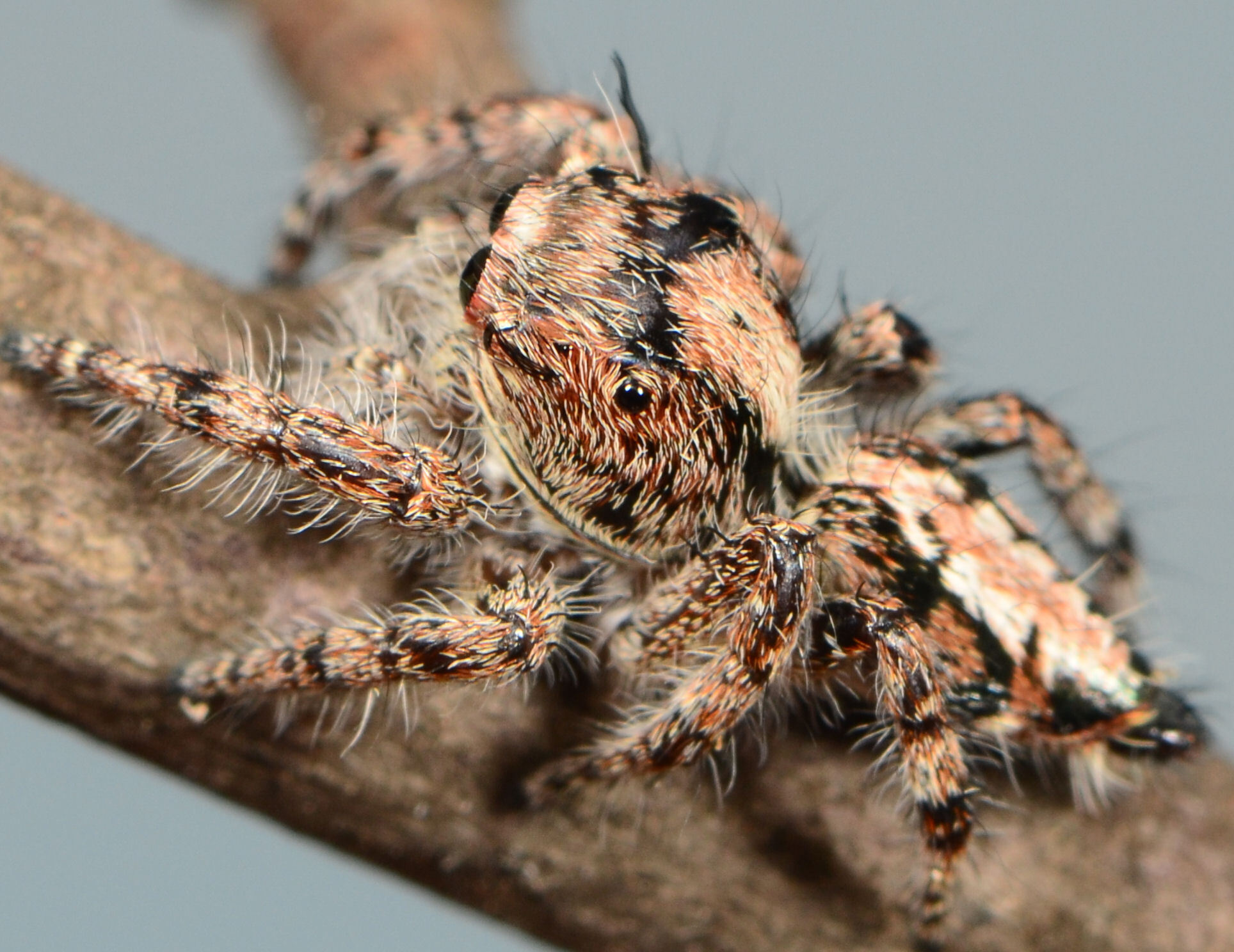
female

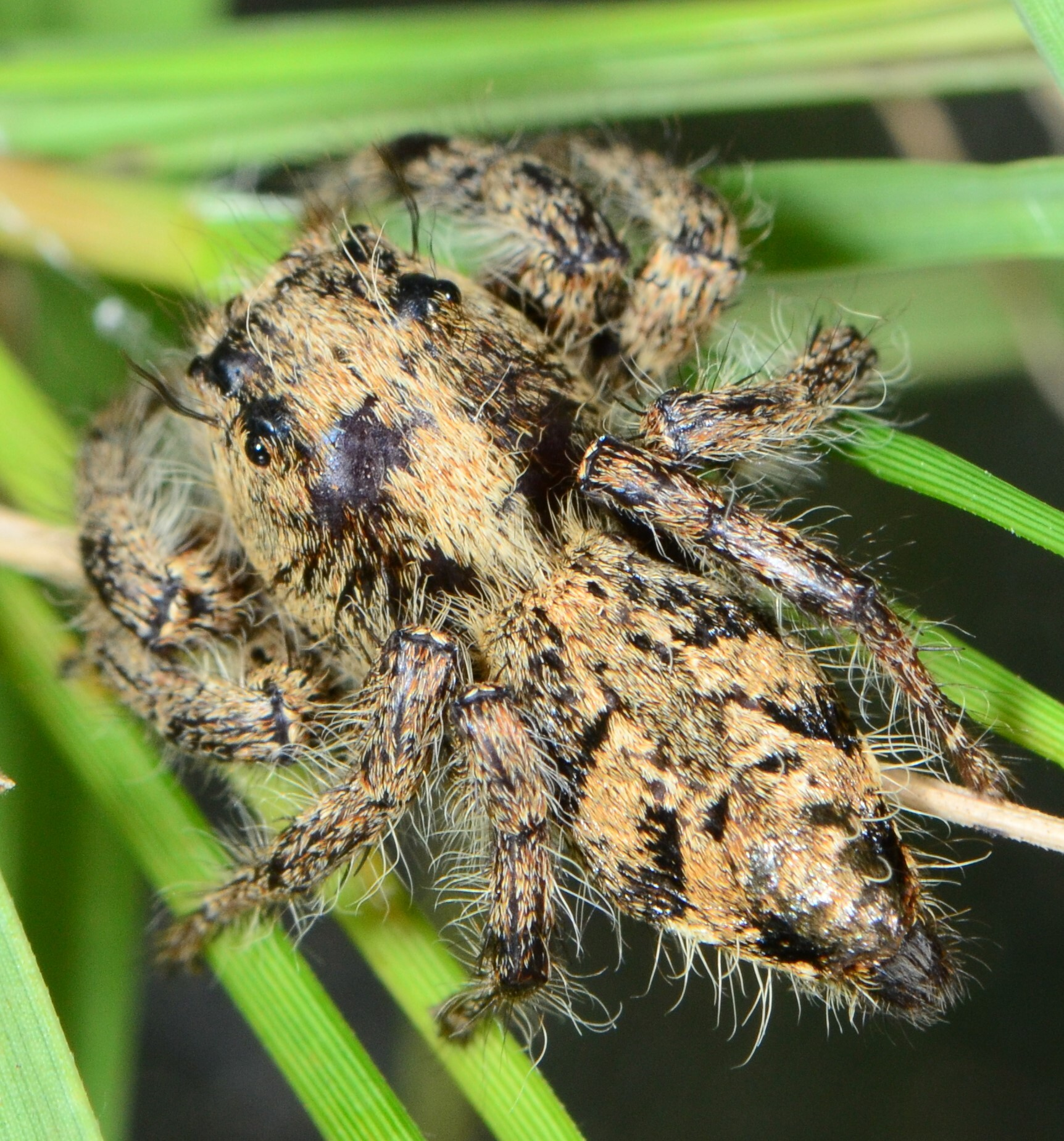
female

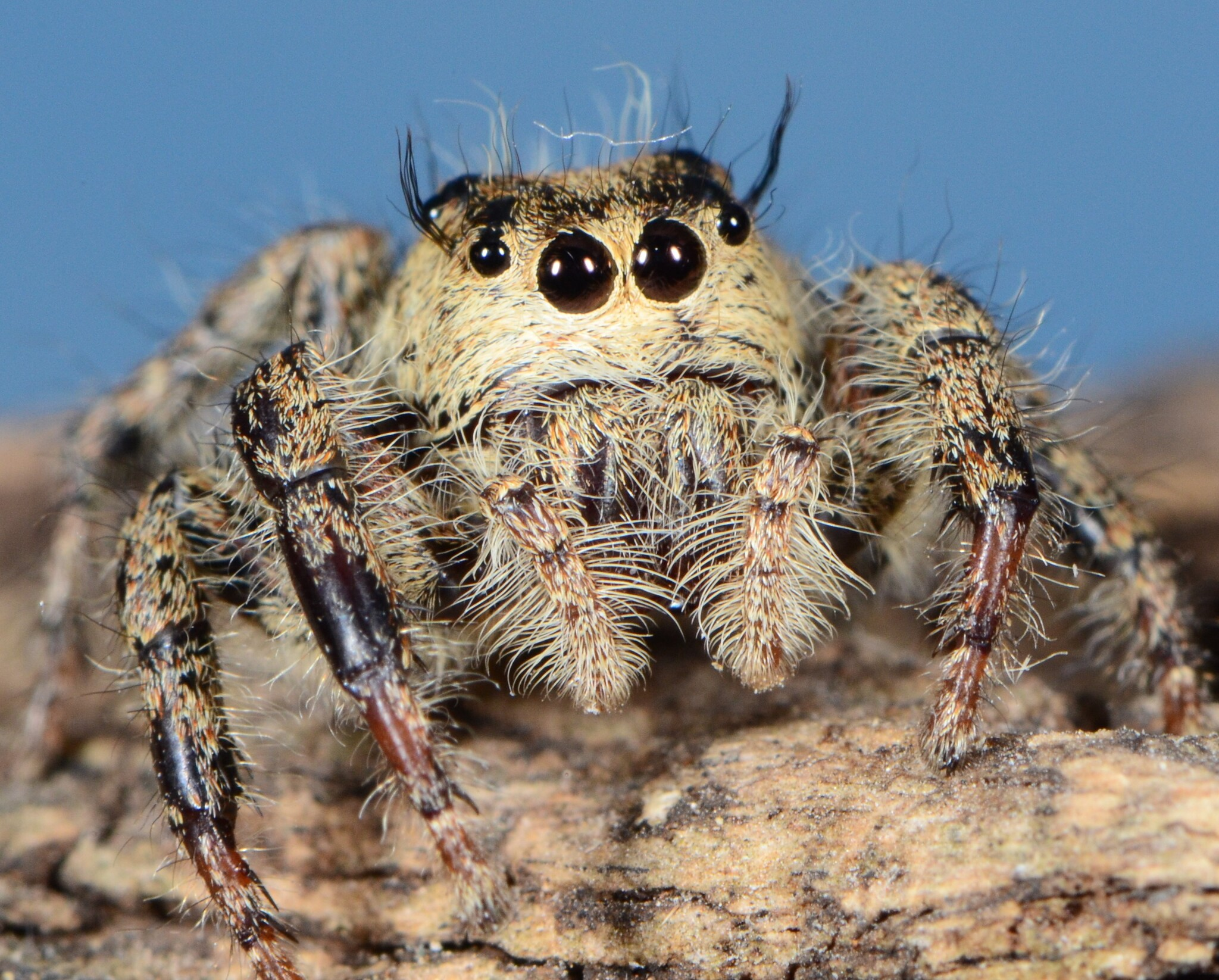
female

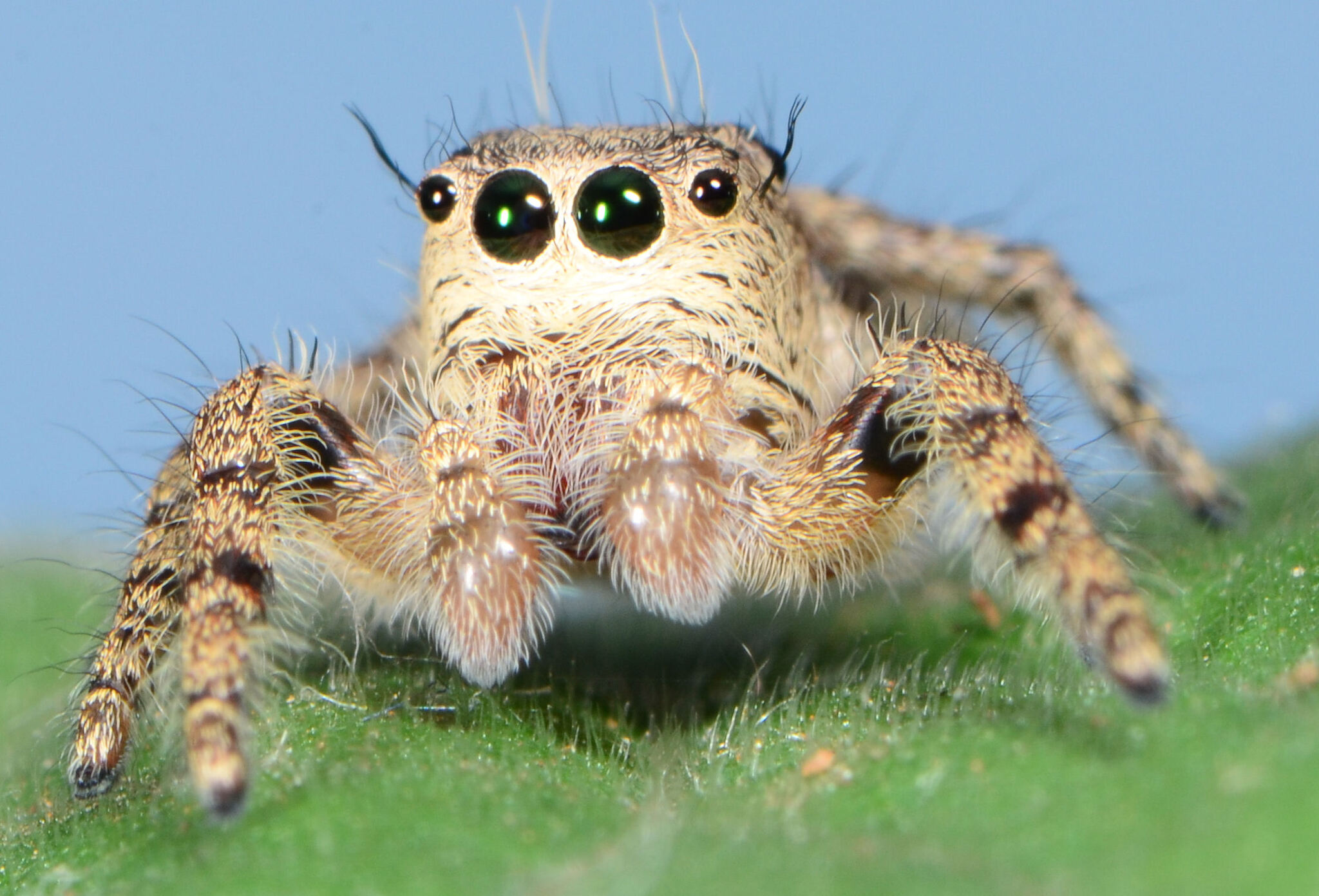
juvenile male

== Conservation ==
Hyllus brevitarsis is listed as Least Concern due to its wide geographical range across South Africa. It is protected in more than ten protected areas.

== Taxonomy ==
Hyllus brevitarsis was originally described by Eugène Simon in 1902 from South Africa, with the type locality given only as "Cape of Good Hope". The species was redescribed by Wesołowska in 2008.
