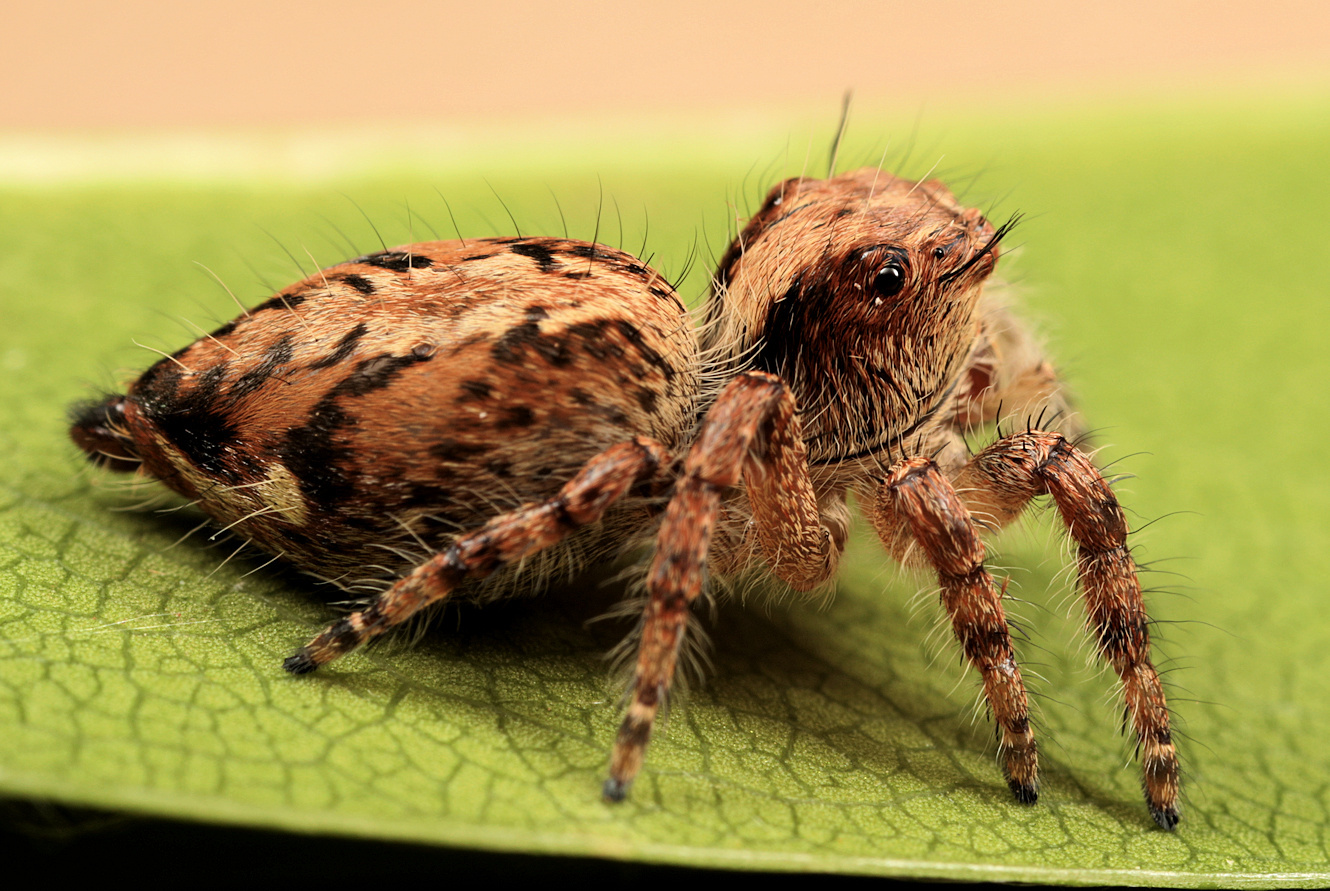
- female
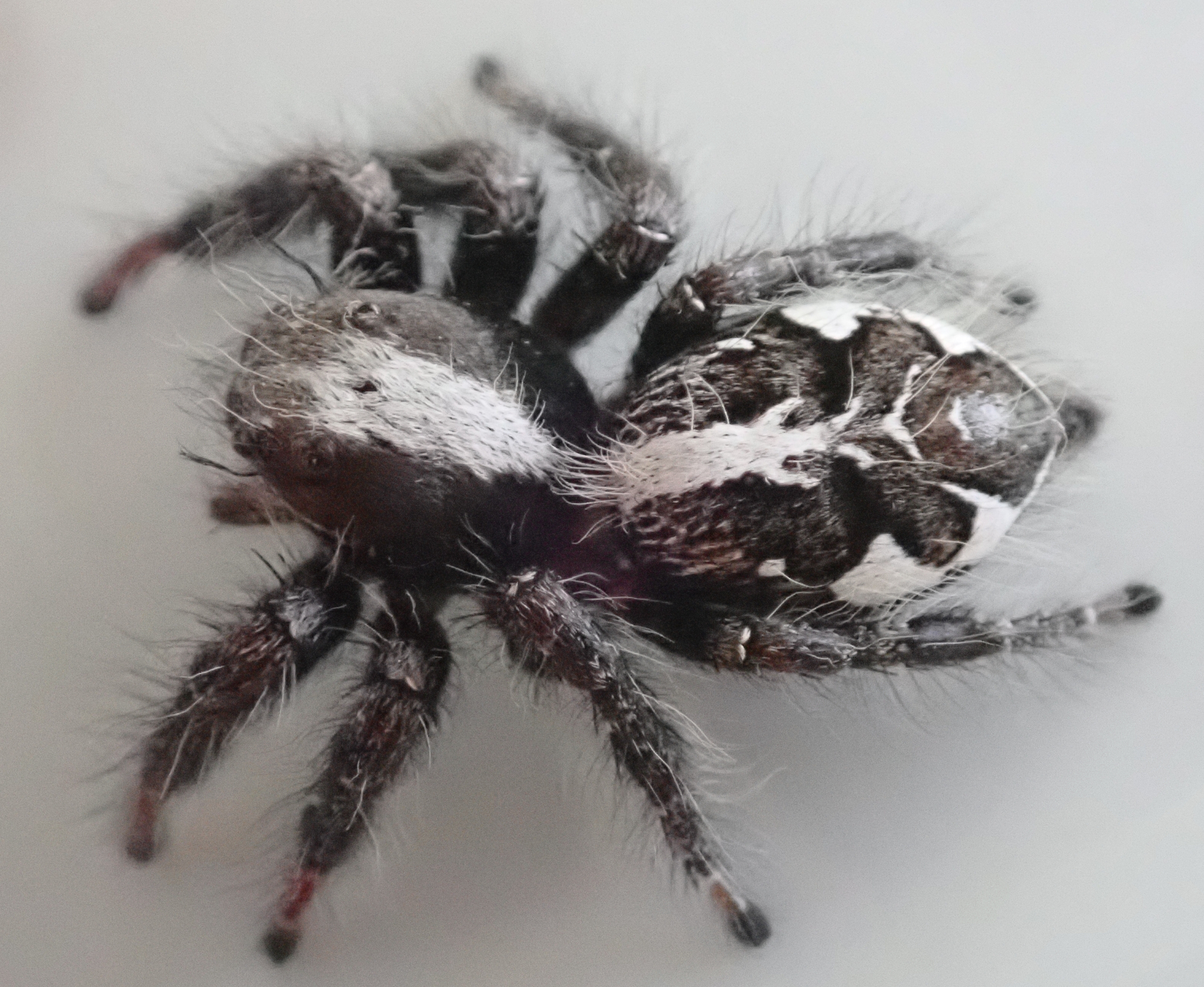
- male

Scientific classification
- Kingdom: Animalia
- Phylum: Arthropoda
- Subphylum: Chelicerata
- Class: Arachnida
- Order: Araneae
- Infraorder: Araneomorphae
- Family: Salticidae
- Genus: Hyllus
- Species: H. treleaveni

Binomial name
- Hyllus treleaveni Peckham & Peckham, 1902

Synonyms
- Hyllus treleavenii Peckham & Peckham, 1902; Hyllus moestus Peckham & Peckham, 1903; Hyllus bevisi Lessert, 1925; Hyllus marleyi Lessert, 1925; Hyllus normanae Wanless & Clark, 1975

= Hyllus treleaveni =

Treleaven's Hyllus Jumping Spider

Species of spider

Hyllus treleaveni is a species of spider in the family Salticidae. It is found in Africa and is commonly known as Treleaven's Hyllus jumping spider.

== Distribution ==
Hyllus treleaveni is distributed across Angola, Botswana, DR Congo, Guinea, Ivory Coast, Kenya, Mozambique, Namibia, South Africa, Tanzania, Zambia and Zimbabwe.

In South Africa, the species is known from seven provinces: Eastern Cape, Free State, KwaZulu-Natal, Limpopo, Mpumalanga, North West and Western Cape

== Habitat and ecology ==
H. treleaveni is commonly collected from foliage such as broadleaved shrubs in various savannah and floodplain habitats.

In South Africa, it has been recorded from multiple biomes including Fynbos, Forest, Grassland, Indian Ocean Coastal Belt, Savanna and Thicket, at altitudes ranging from 10 to 1558 m.

== Description ==
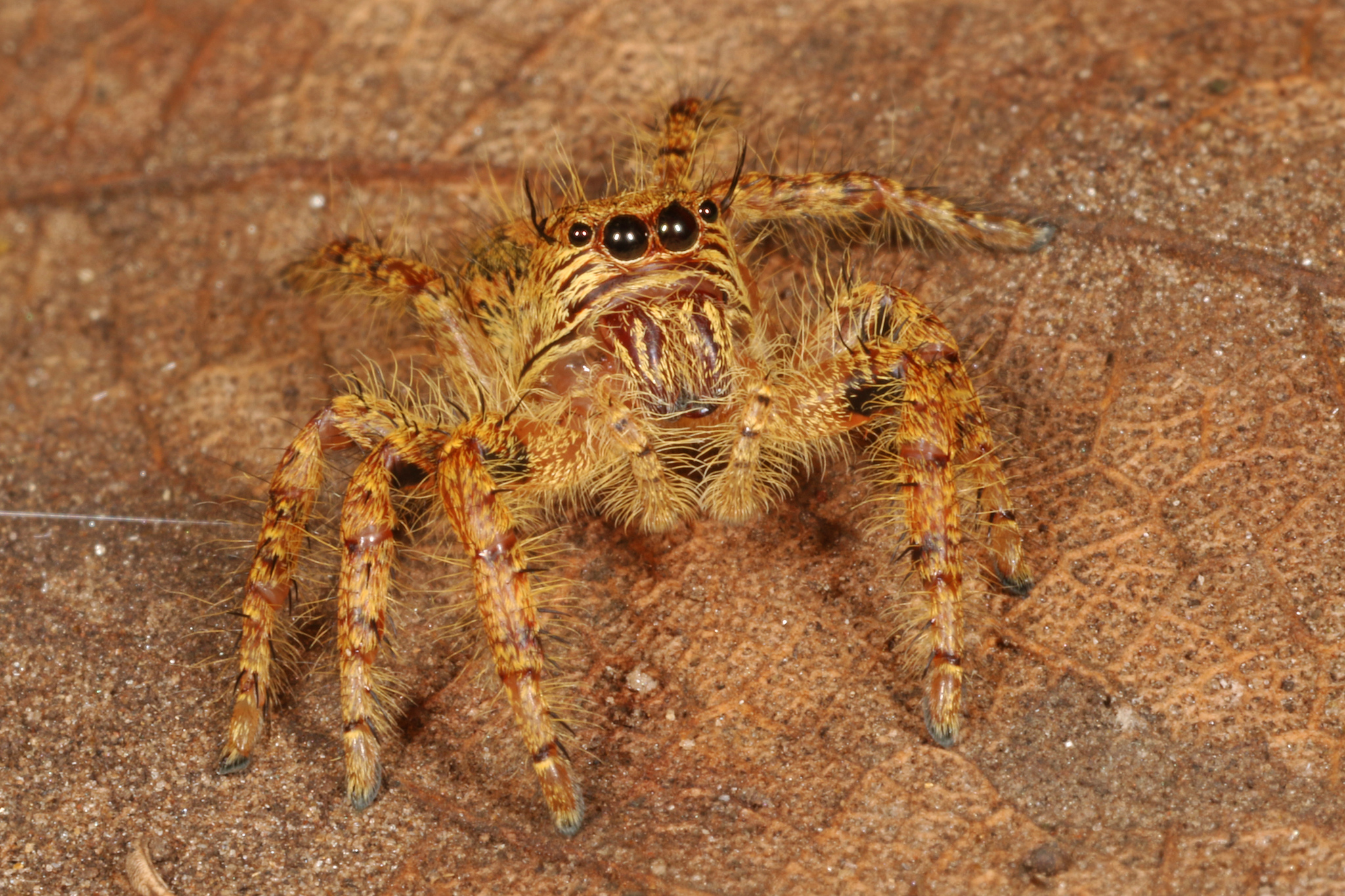
female

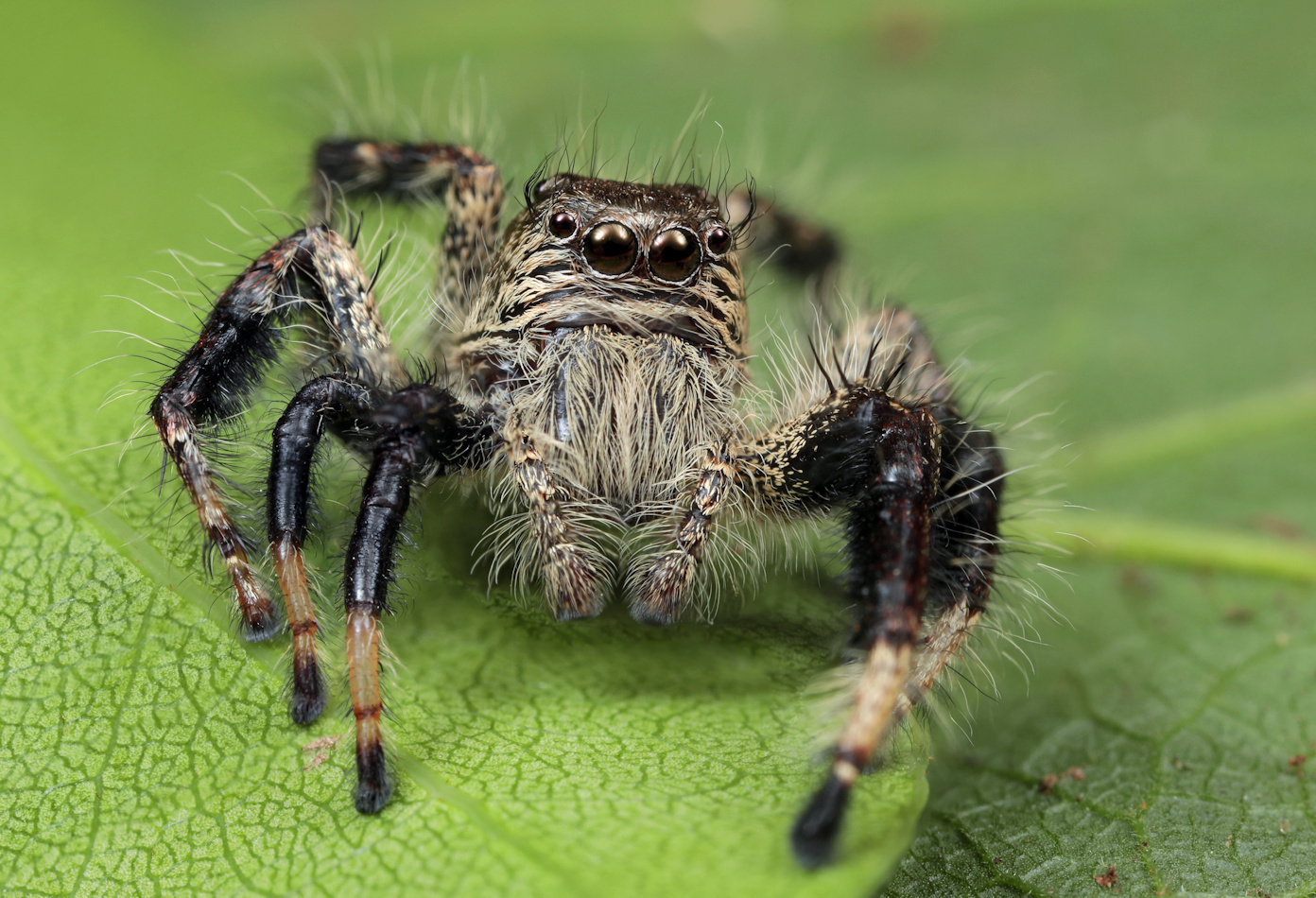
male

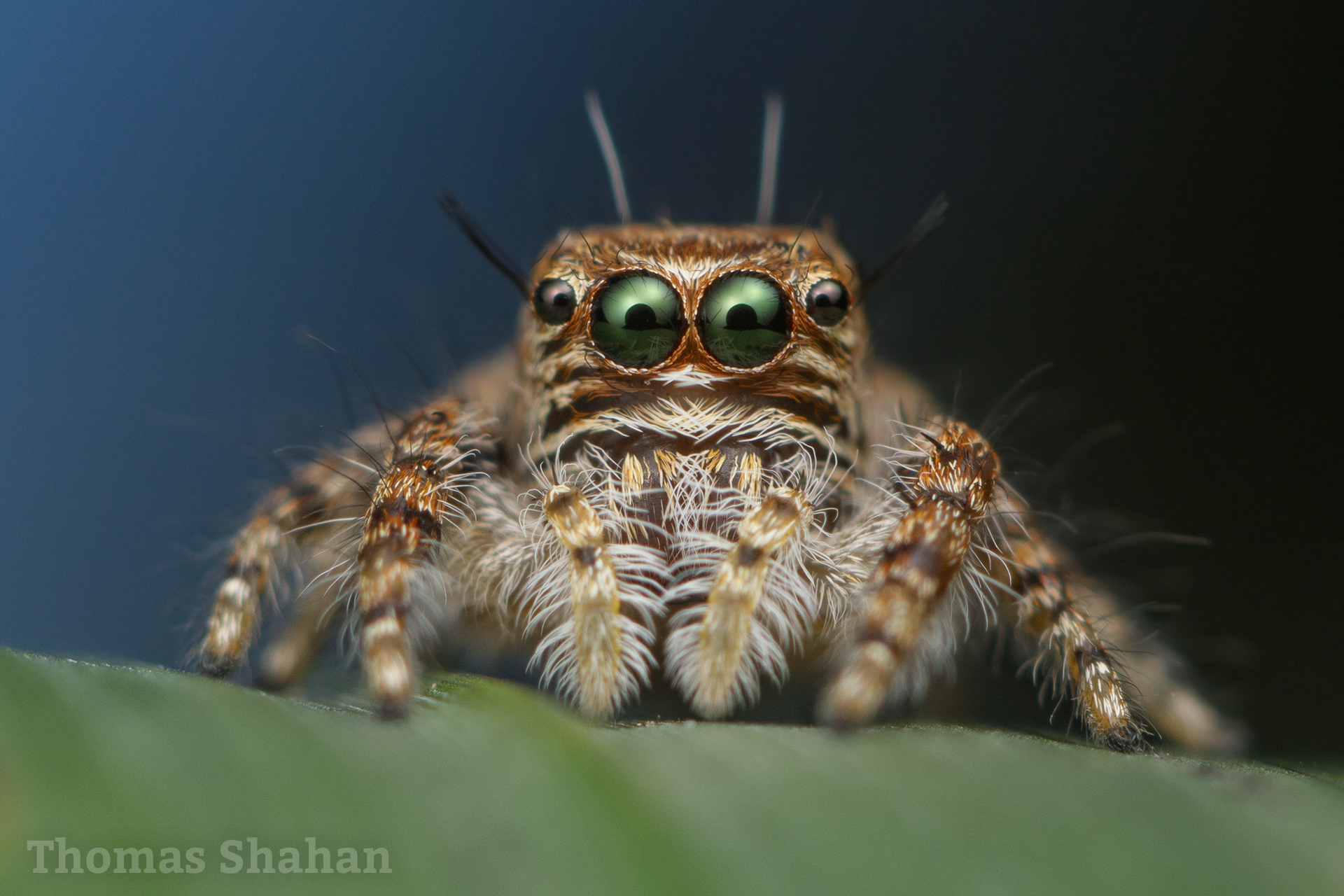
juvenile

This species is Africa's largest jumping spider.

== Conservation ==
Hyllus treleaveni is listed as Least Concern due to its wide geographical range. It is protected in more than ten protected areas in South Africa.

== Taxonomy ==
Hyllus treleaveni was originally described in 1902 from Zimbabwe. The species was redescribed by Wesołowska and Cumming in 2004.
