= Hyllus remotus =

Scientific classification
- Kingdom: Animalia
- Phylum: Arthropoda
- Subphylum: Chelicerata
- Class: Arachnida
- Order: Araneae
- Infraorder: Araneomorphae
- Family: Salticidae
- Genus: Hyllus
- Species: H. remotus

Binomial name
- Hyllus remotus Wesołowska & Russell-Smith, 2011

Species of spider

Hyllus remotus is a species of jumping spider in the genus Hyllus that is endemic to Nigeria. It lives near rivers. The female of the species was first described in 2011 by Wanda Wesołowska and Anthony Russell-Smith. The male has not been identified, which means that the species is only tentatively included in the genus. It is large, with a brown carapace typically 2.9 mm (0.11 in) long and an abdomen 4.2 mm (0.17 in) long. The spider is brown and brownish-grey with a white pattern on its back. It is similar to Hyllus plexippoides, except for its longer seminal ducts and the way that the gonopores are positioned.

== Taxonomy ==
Hyllus remotus is a jumping spider that was first described by Wanda Wesołowska and Anthony Russell-Smith in 2011. It is one of over 500 species identified by the Polish arachnologist Wesołowska. The species name is a Latin word that recalls the distinctiveness of the species. It was allocated to the genus Hyllus, first raised by Carl Ludwig Koch in 1846, although Wesołowska and Russell-Smith noted that there is uncertainty as the male has not been identified. The genus is similar to Evarcha, differing in size. Molecular analysis confirms that they are related but the precise relationship between the genera is unknown and species from one genus are sometimes misidentified as members of the other. The genus is found throughout Africa and contains one of the largest jumping spiders discovered.

In Wayne Maddison's 2015 study of spider phylogenetic classification, the genus Hyllus was placed in the clade Saltafresia. He considered that it a member of the subtribe Plexippina in the tribe Plexippini. Two years later, in 2017, Jerzy Prószyński grouped the genus with nine other genera of jumping spiders under the name Hyllines, which was named after the genus. He used the shape of the embolus as a distinguishing sign for the group. Hyllines was itself tentatively placed within a supergroup named Hylloida, again named after the genus.

== Description ==
The spider is large. The female has a round brown cephalothorax that is typically 2.9 mm (0.11 in) long and 2.2 mm (0.087 in) wide. It has a large light brown oval carapace that is covered in brown hairs and has a large white patch the stretches from the fovea to the back of the carapace and light streaks on its sides. There are black rings around its eyes. The clypeus is low and yellow. The chelicerae are light brown. The labium and maxillae are yellow. The abdomen is a slightly elongated oval, typically 4.2 mm (0.17 in) long and 2.5 mm (0.098 in) wide. It brownish-grey and has a pattern of three white streaks on the top and a thin band down the middle of the underside. The legs are light brown, and have brown hairs. The spinnerets are brownish. The spider has a triangular epigyne that has a single shallow depression and simple spermathecae. The species is similar to Hyllus plexippoides, although it has longer seminal ducts and the gonopores are positioned differently. The male has not been described.

== Distribution and habitat ==
The species is endemic to Nigeria. The holotype was found in the Borgu Game Reserve in Kwara State in 1973. It thrives in wet environments near rivers.
