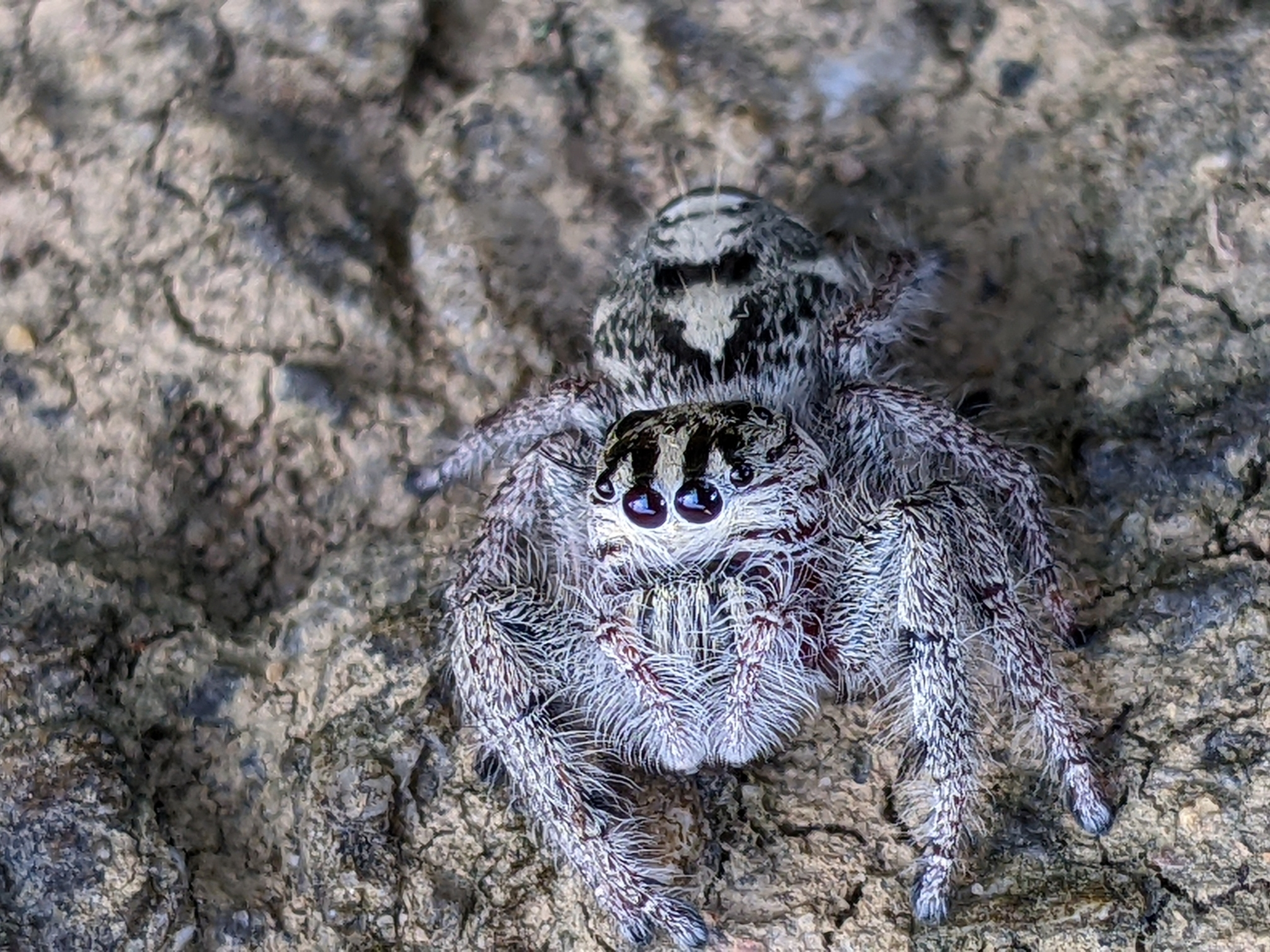
- female from Singapore
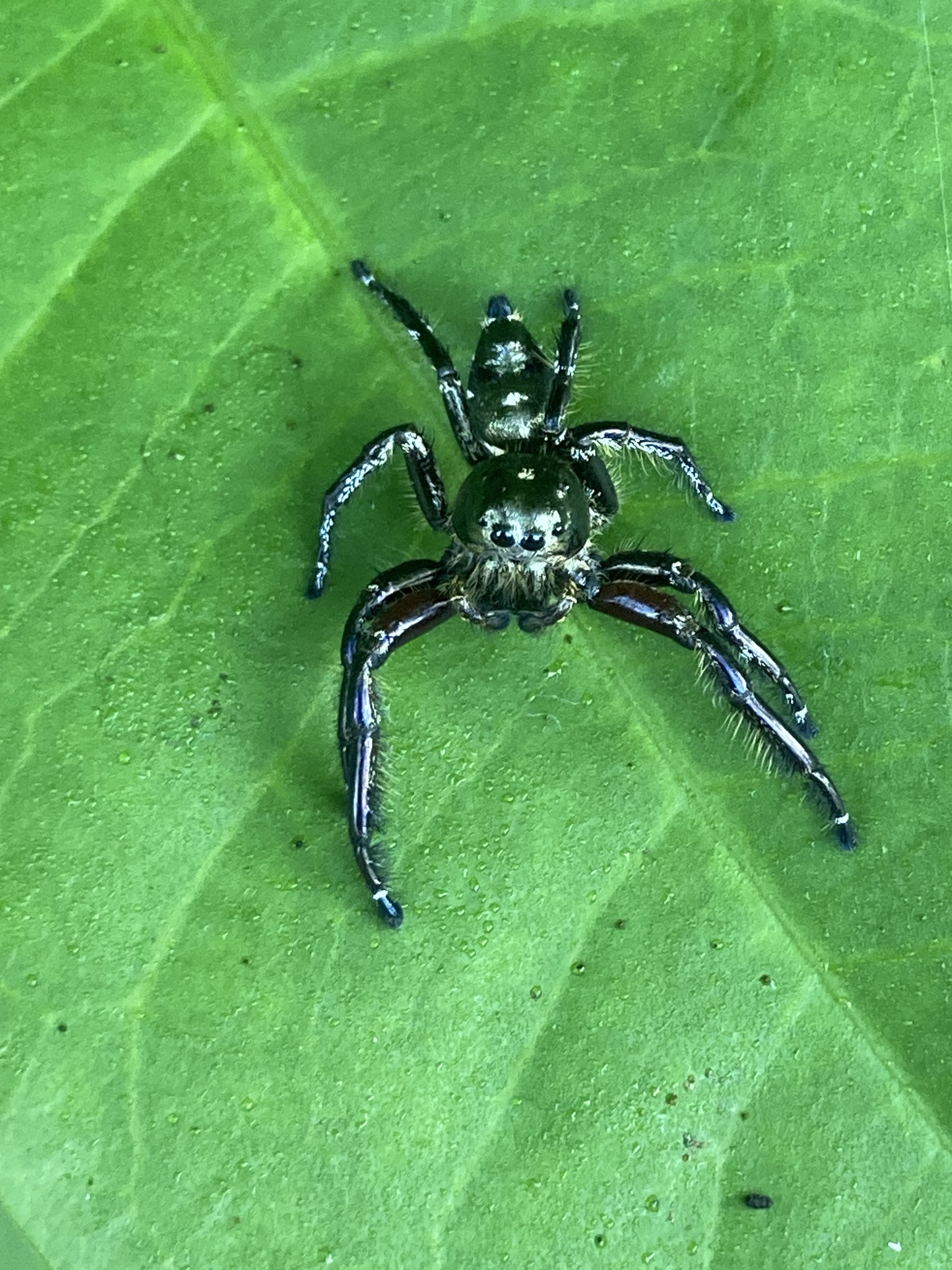
- male from Singapore

Scientific classification
- Kingdom: Animalia
- Phylum: Arthropoda
- Subphylum: Chelicerata
- Class: Arachnida
- Order: Araneae
- Infraorder: Araneomorphae
- Family: Salticidae
- Genus: Hyllus
- Species: H. diardi

Binomial name
- Hyllus diardi (Walckenaer, 1837)

Synonyms
- Attus diardi Walckenaer, 1837; Plexippus mutillarius C.L. Koch, 1846; Plexippus janthinus C.L. Koch, 1846; Plexippus succinctus C.L. Koch, 1846; Plexippus lacertosus C.L. Koch, 1846; Hyllus maskaranus Barrion & Litsinger, 1995

= Hyllus diardi =

Heavy Jumper

Species of jumping spider

Hyllus diardi is a species of jumping spider in the family Salticidae. It was first described by French arachnologist Charles Athanase Walckenaer in 1837.

== Distribution ==
H. diardi is widely distributed across Southeast Asia and southwestern China. The species has been recorded from China, Myanmar, Thailand, Laos, Vietnam, Malaysia, Philippines, and Indonesia.

== Habitat ==
This jumping spider inhabits various environments across its range in tropical and subtropical Asia.

== Description ==
Variations from CL Koch (1846)

male

female

male

juvenile

male

male

Hyllus diardi is a relatively large jumping spider. Males have a total body length of approximately 12 mm, with the carapace measuring about 5.8 mm in length. The male carapace is dark brown and sparsely covered with iridescent metallic yellow setae, featuring a central line of white setae. The abdomen is yellowish brown with iridescent metallic yellow setae and a line of dense white setae.

Females are slightly larger, reaching about 12.3 mm in total length with a carapace length of 4.8 mm. The female carapace is reddish-brown with short yellow setae and bears two distinctive tufts of long dark setae below the posterior median eyes that resemble "horns". The abdomen is yellow with grey setae and decorated with inverted chevron patterns.

Males can be distinguished from closely related species by their short tibia (about as long as wide), which is approximately half the length of the cymbium, and by the flat, wide tip of the retrolateral tibial apophysis that is directed dorsally. Females are characterized by very large, egg-shaped copulatory openings that are longer than wide and significantly wider than the median septum.

== Taxonomy ==
The taxonomic history of H. diardi is complex, with several species names now considered synonymous. The species was originally described as Attus diardi by Walckenaer in 1837 based on a female specimen. Subsequently, C.L. Koch described several related forms in 1846 that are now recognized as the same species.

Recent taxonomic work has clarified the synonymy, with Hyllus maskaranus Barrion & Litsinger, 1995 from the Philippines confirmed as a junior synonym. However, some previous synonymies have been questioned, and Phidippus tirapensis Biswas & Biswas, 2006 has been removed from synonymy with H. diardi and transferred to Hyllus as H. tirapensis.
