= Hyllus (mythology) =

Various characters from Greek mythology

In Greek mythology, Hyllus (/ˈhɪləs/; Ancient Greek: Ὕλλος) was the name of the following characters:

- Hyllus, a Lydian son of Gaia after whom a river was named. After this stream, Heracles named his son, Hyllus.
- Hyllus, son of Heracles and Deianira.
