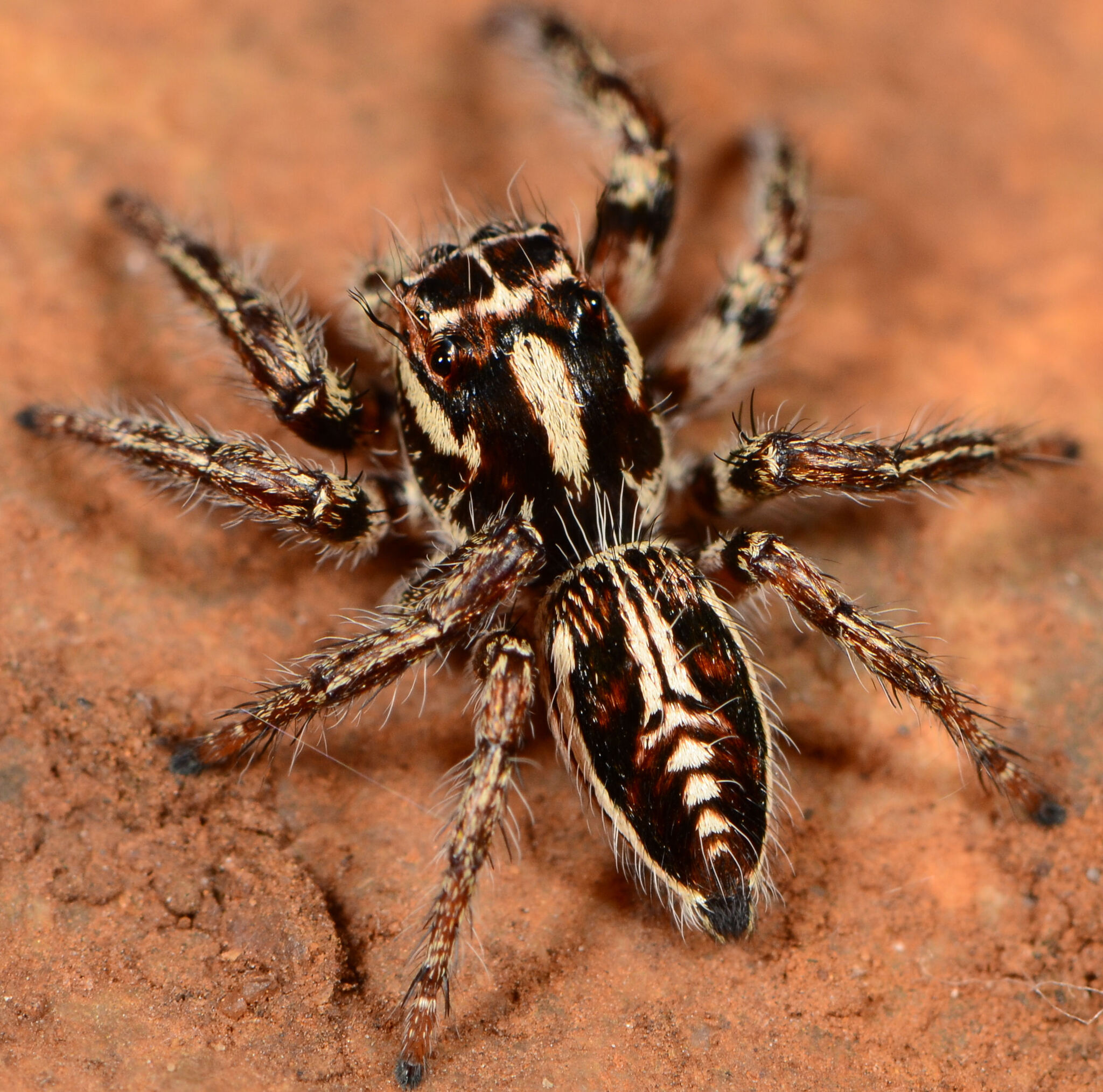
- female
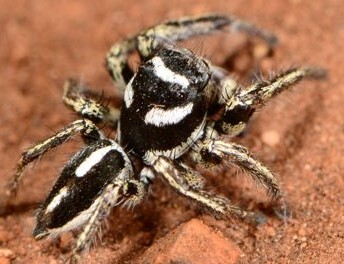
- male

Scientific classification
- Kingdom: Animalia
- Phylum: Arthropoda
- Subphylum: Chelicerata
- Class: Arachnida
- Order: Araneae
- Infraorder: Araneomorphae
- Family: Salticidae
- Genus: Hyllus
- Species: H. argyrotoxus

Binomial name
- Hyllus argyrotoxus Simon, 1902

Synonyms
- Hyllus perspicuus Peckham & Peckham, 1903

= Hyllus argyrotoxus =

Black and white Hyllus jumping spider

Species of spider

Hyllus argyrotoxus is a species of jumping spider in the family Salticidae. It is found in Africa and is commonly known as the black and white Hyllus jumping spider. Like other members of the genus Hyllus, it is a robust, visually oriented predator adapted to hunting on vegetation.

== Distribution ==
Hyllus argyrotoxus is distributed across a wide area in Africa, being found in Botswana, Eswatini, Ivory Coast, Kenya, Mozambique, Namibia, South Africa, Tanzania, Uganda and Zimbabwe.

In South Africa, the species has a wide distribution and is known from the provinces Eastern Cape, Gauteng, KwaZulu-Natal, Limpopo, Mpumalanga, North West and Western Cape.

== Habitat and ecology ==
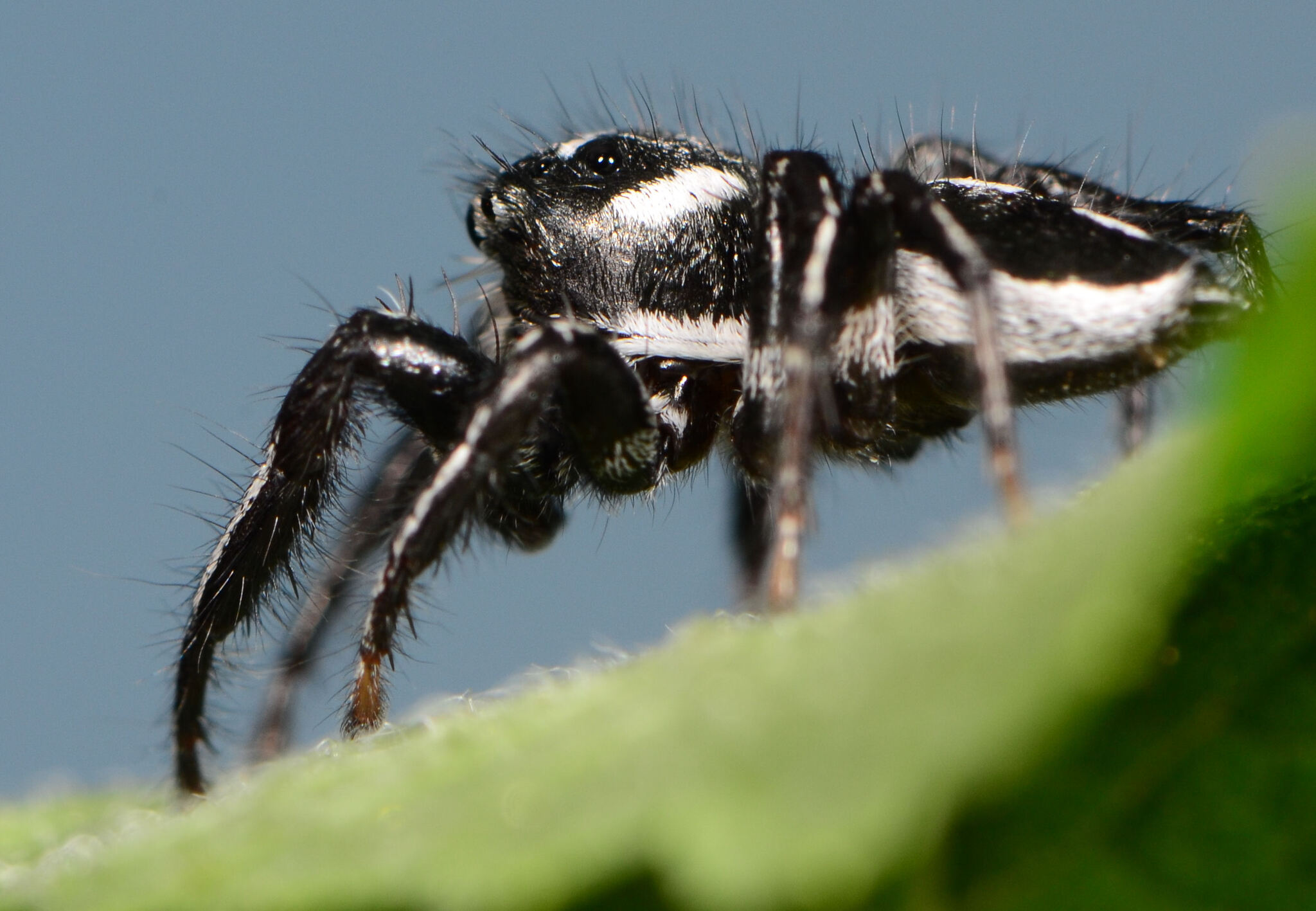
male

This species is a highly mobile, plant-dwelling spider that moves boldly through low vegetation and shrubs. It is most frequently collected from bushes and trees rather than from the ground layer. Females construct silken retreats on the underside of leaves, folding the leaf into a broad tube in which the egg sac is deposited and guarded.

In South Africa, Hyllus argyrotoxus inhabits a wide range of biomes including Fynbos, forest, grassland, Indian Ocean coastal belt, savanna and thicket, at altitudes ranging from approximately 17 to 1558 m above sea level. The species has also been recorded in agricultural ecosystems such as avocado, citrus, cotton and macadamia orchards, indicating a tolerance for modified habitats.

== Behavior ==
Hyllus argyrotoxus is diurnal and actively hunts prey using vision rather than webs, a characteristic trait of jumping spiders. It stalks and captures small arthropods by means of short, rapid leaps. Although specific courtship behavior has not been described in detail for this species, members of the family Salticidae are known for complex visual courtship displays involving leg movements and body posturing.

== Description ==
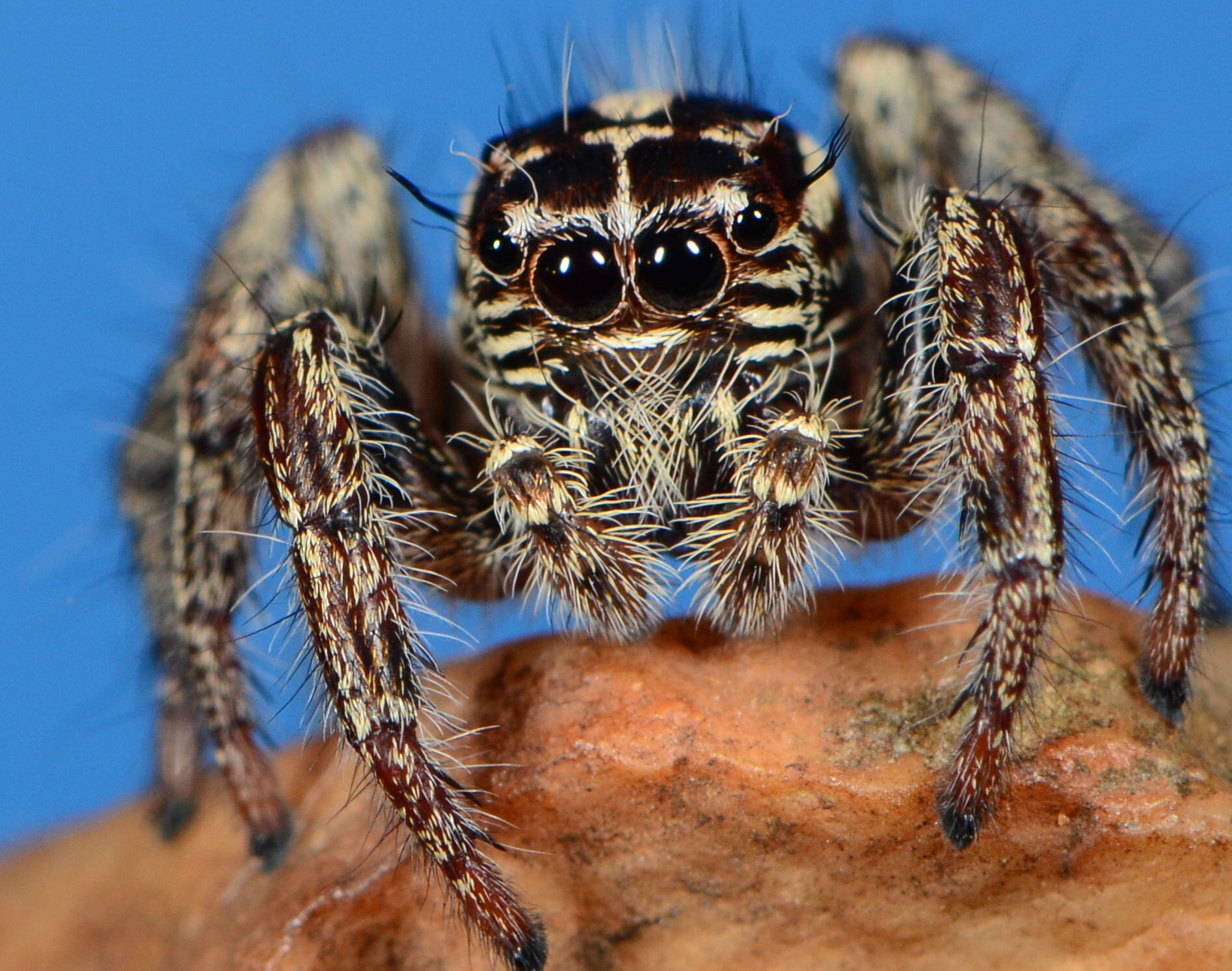
female

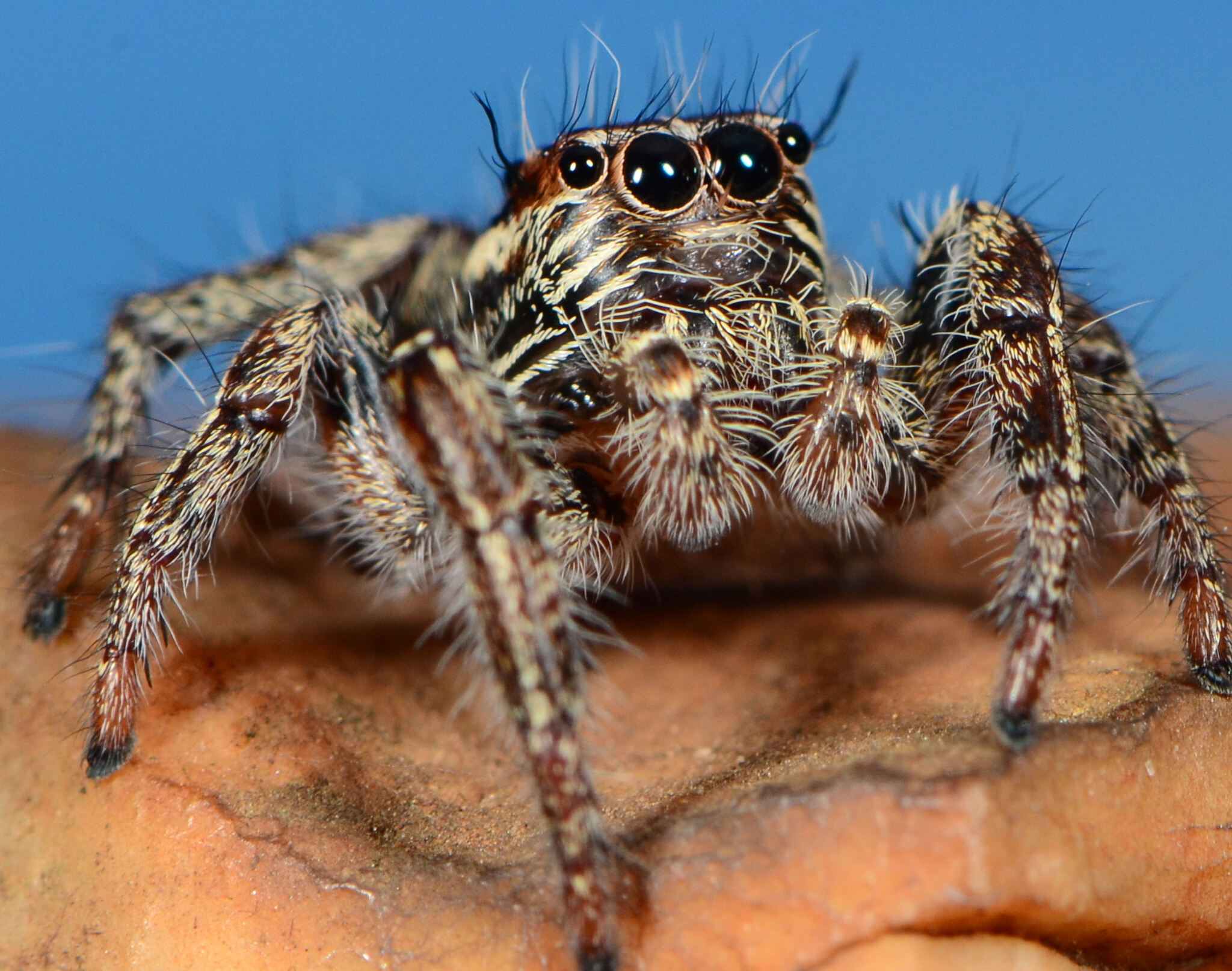
female

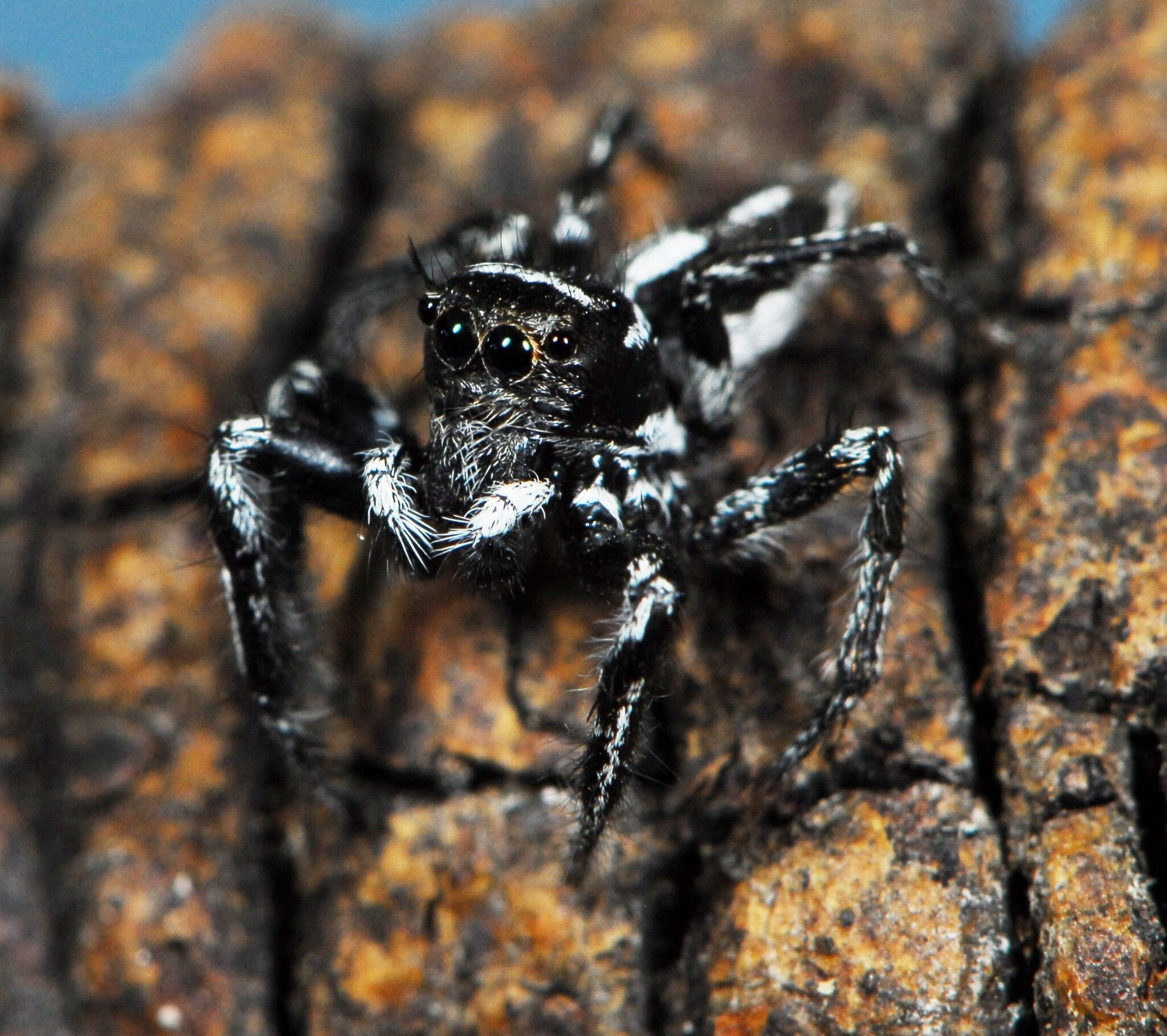
male

Hyllus argyrotoxus is a medium to large-sized salticid with a robust body and relatively long legs. The species exhibits sexual dimorphism, with females generally larger and more heavily built than males. Both sexes possess large anterior median eyes that provide acute binocular vision. The coloration is typically contrasting black, dark brown and white or silvery markings, which are more distinct in males. Diagnostic characters of the male palp and female epigyne have been illustrated and described in taxonomic literature.

== Conservation ==
Hyllus argyrotoxus is listed as Least Concern due to its wide geographical range and occurrence across multiple habitats in South Africa. It has been recorded from more than ten protected areas, including Addo Elephant National Park, Kruger National Park and Hluhluwe-iMfolozi Park. No major threats to the species have been identified.

== Taxonomy ==
Hyllus argyrotoxus was originally described by Eugène Simon in 1902 from South Africa, with the type locality given only as "Zululand". The species was later redescribed by Wesołowska and Russell-Smith in 2000 as part of a revision of African salticids. Hyllus perspicuus Peckham & Peckham, 1903 was subsequently placed in synonymy with H. argyrotoxus following examination of type material.
