= Hyllus (river) =

River of Asia Minor or its ancient name

Hyllus or Hyllos (Greek: Ὕλλος) was the ancient name of a river of Asia Minor. It is a tributary of the river Hermus, in Lydia, flowing into Hermus from the north. In the time of Strabo, the river was called Phrygius. Today's Turkish name is Kum Çayı.
