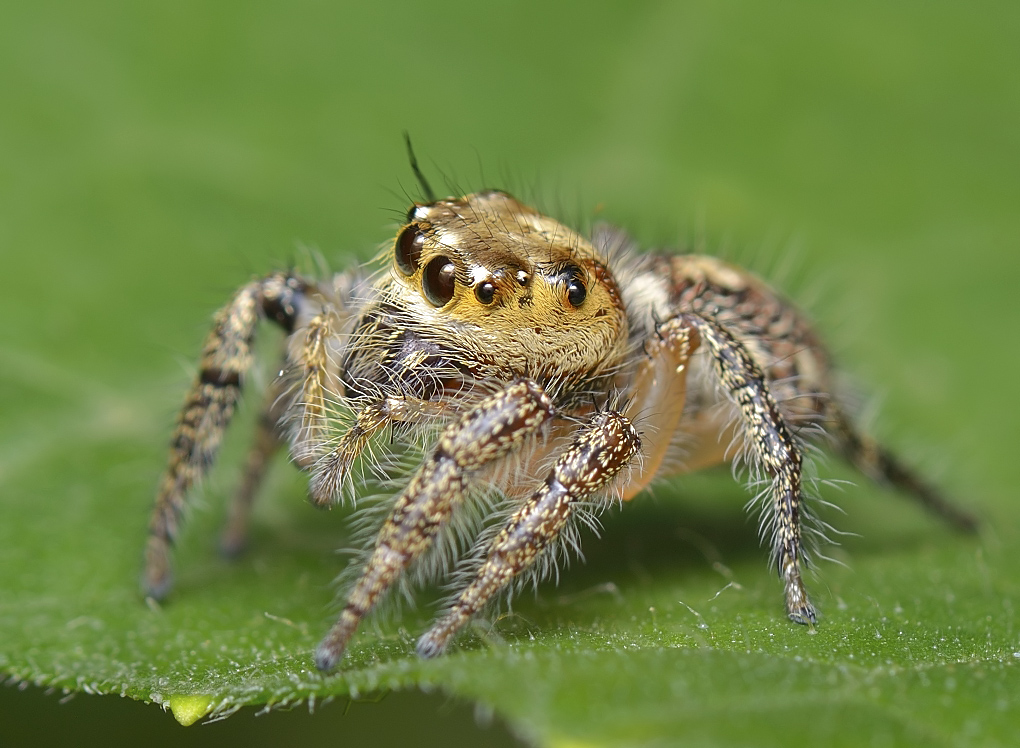
- Hyllus semicupreus
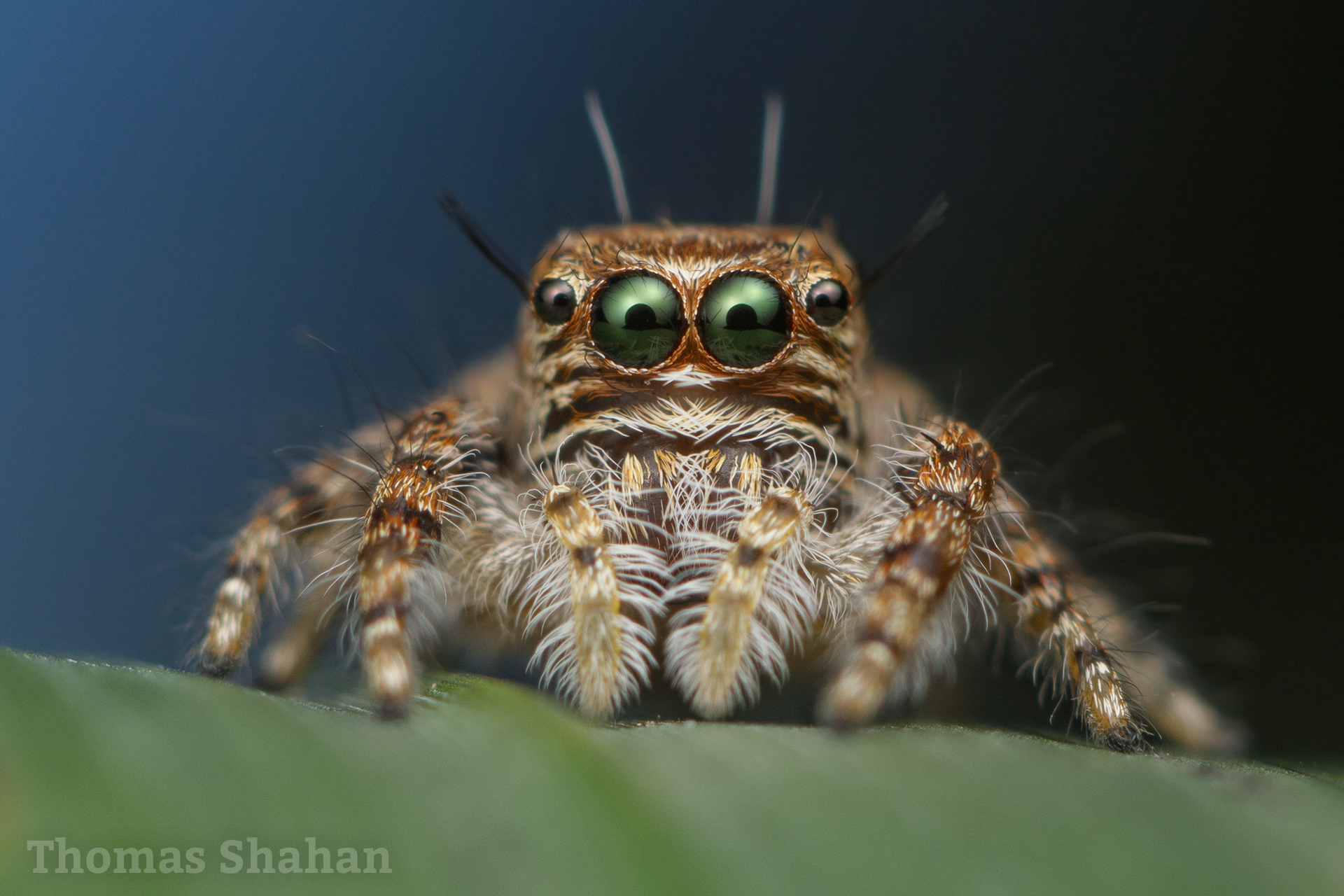
- juvenile H. treleaveni

Scientific classification
- Kingdom: Animalia
- Phylum: Arthropoda
- Subphylum: Chelicerata
- Class: Arachnida
- Order: Araneae
- Infraorder: Araneomorphae
- Family: Salticidae
- Subfamily: Salticinae
- Genus: Hyllus; C. L. Koch, 1846

Type species
- Hyllus giganteus C. L. Koch, 1846

Species
- 74, see text

= Hyllus (spider) =

Genus of spiders

Hyllus is a genus of the spider family Salticidae (jumping spiders). Most species occur in Africa and Madagascar, with many in Australasia and north to India.

== Description ==
Hyllus are medium to large spiders, commonly mistaken for those in the genus Evarcha. They are usually stout, hairy and dully colored, with horns at the top of the median eyes formed by long bristles. They have a rounded carapace, which is larger than the eye field. Spiders in the genus Evarcha are usually smaller and their carapace is thinner.

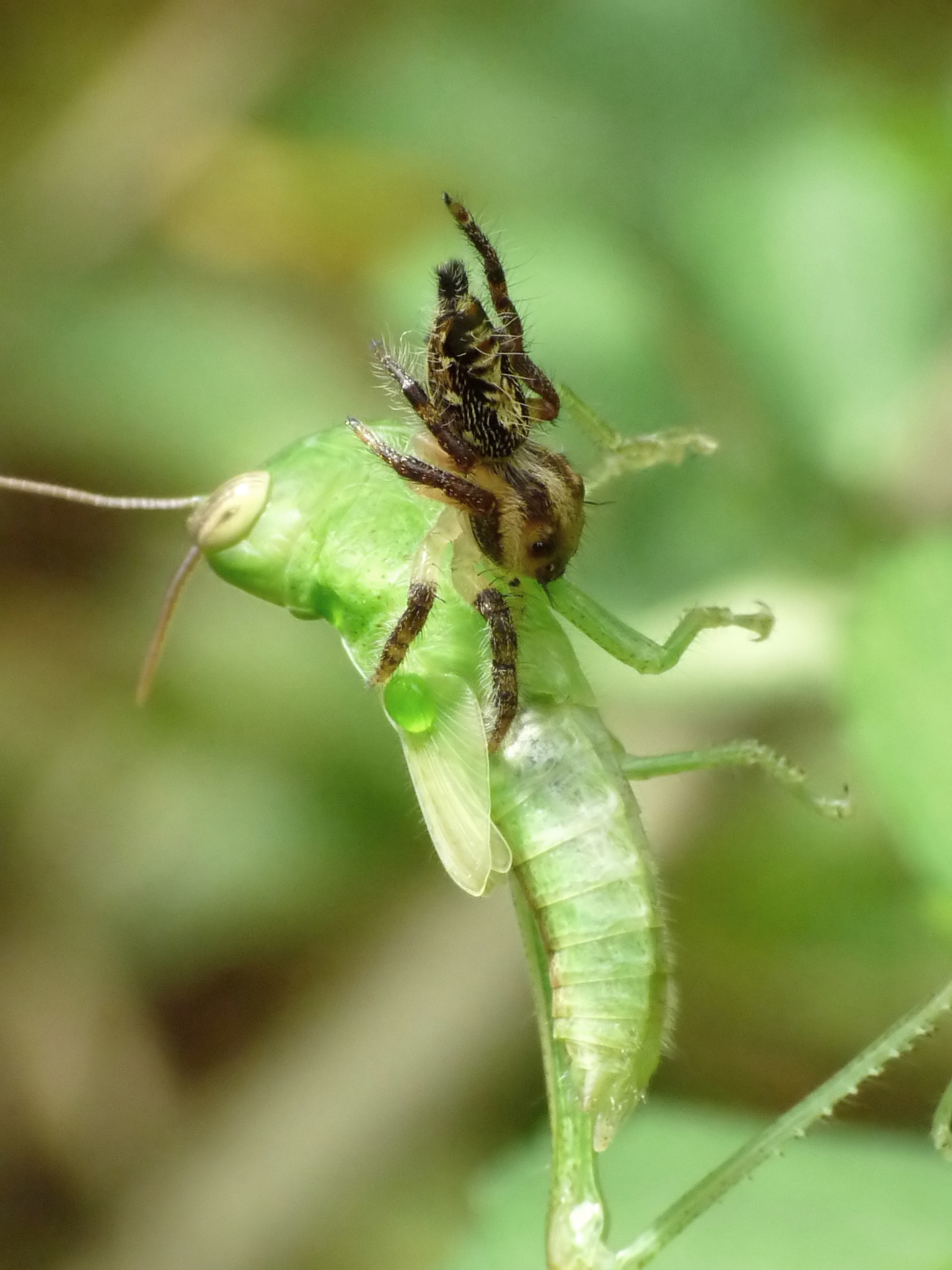
Hyllus semicupreus hunting a grasshopper

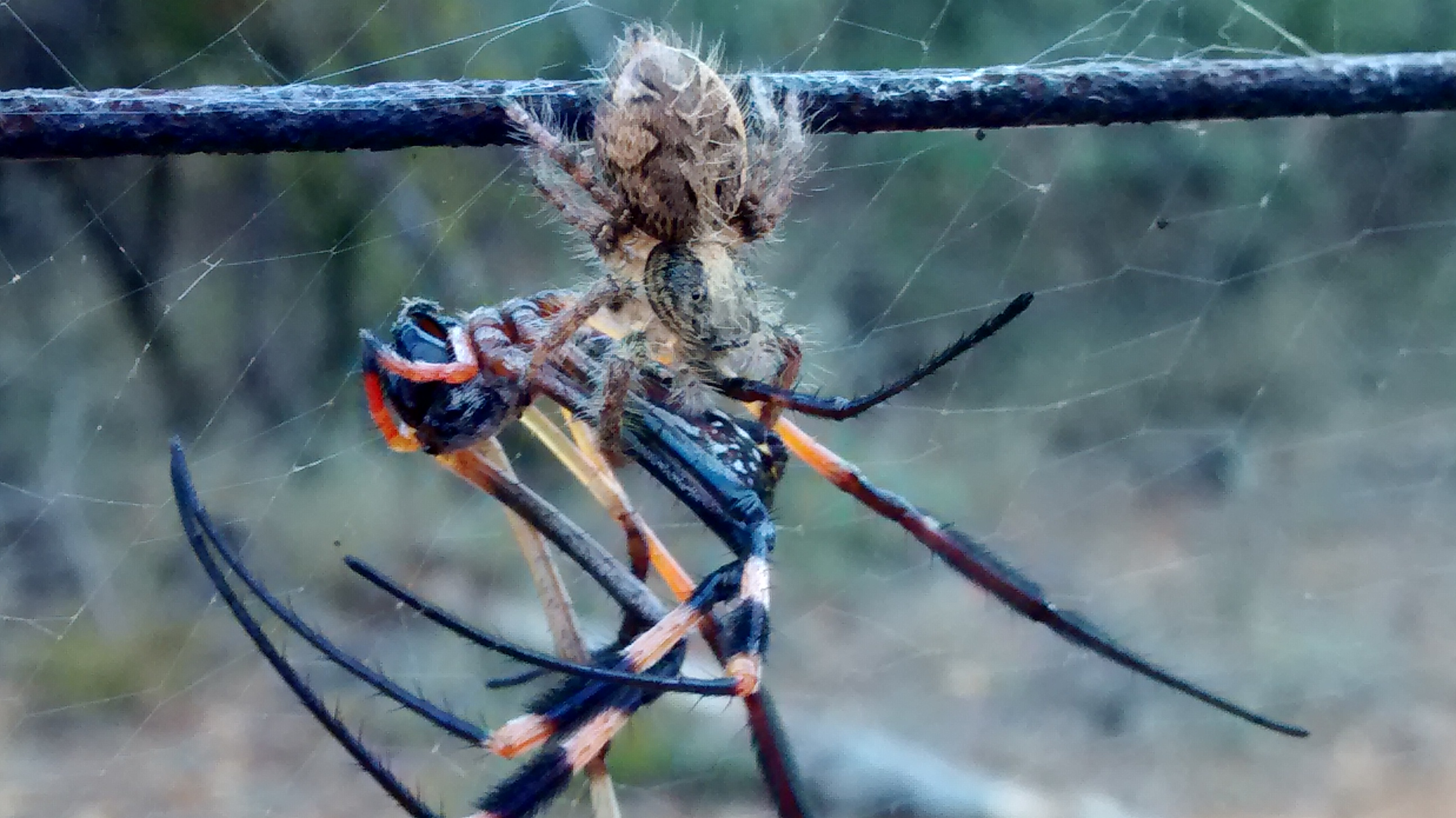
An adult female Hyllus brevitarsus feeds on a subadult female Nephila senegalensis.

== Name ==
Hyllus was the son of Heracles and Deianira in Greek mythology.

== Species ==
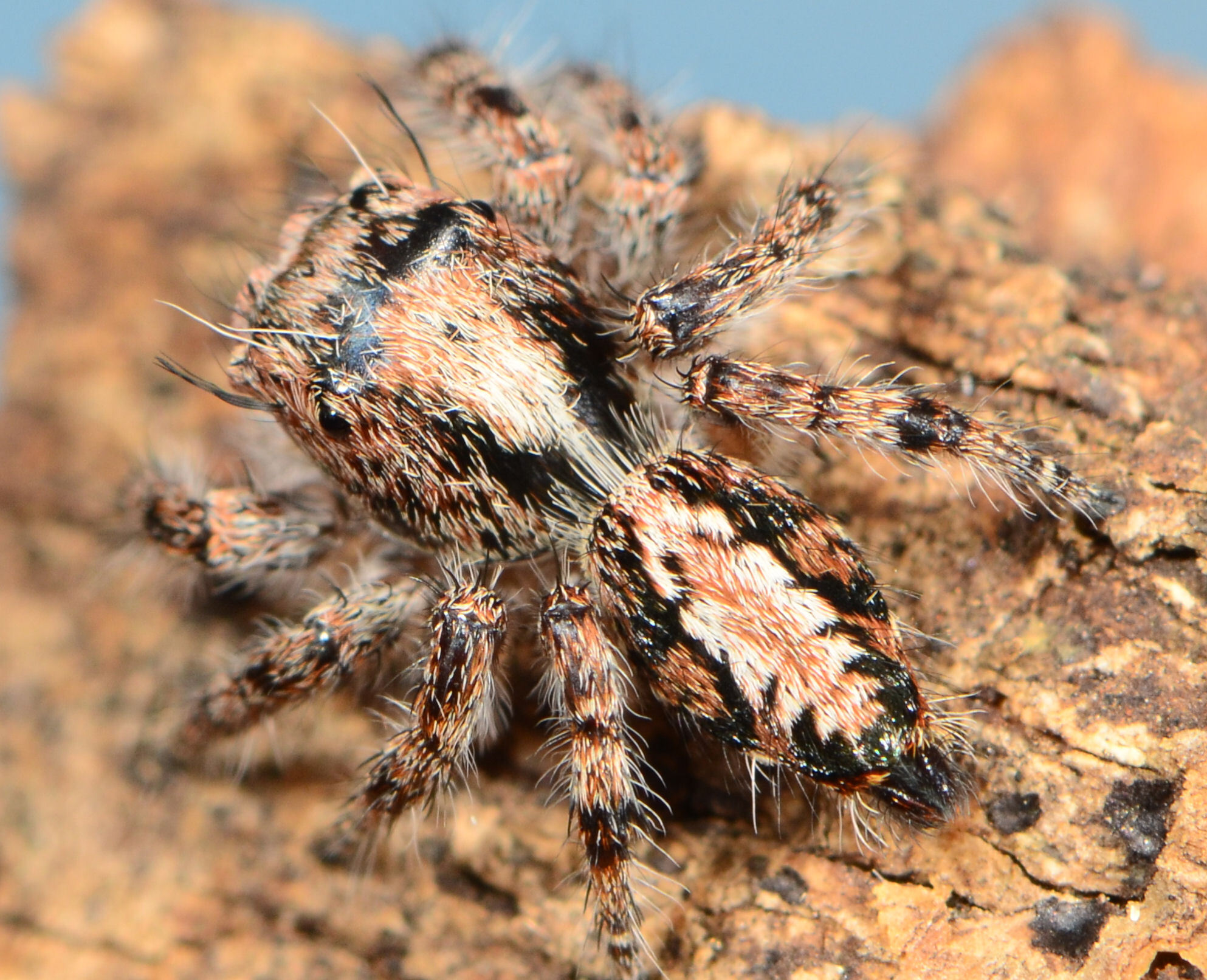
female H. brevitarsus

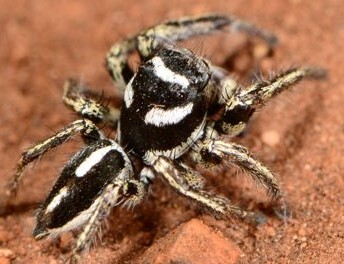
male H. argyrotoxus

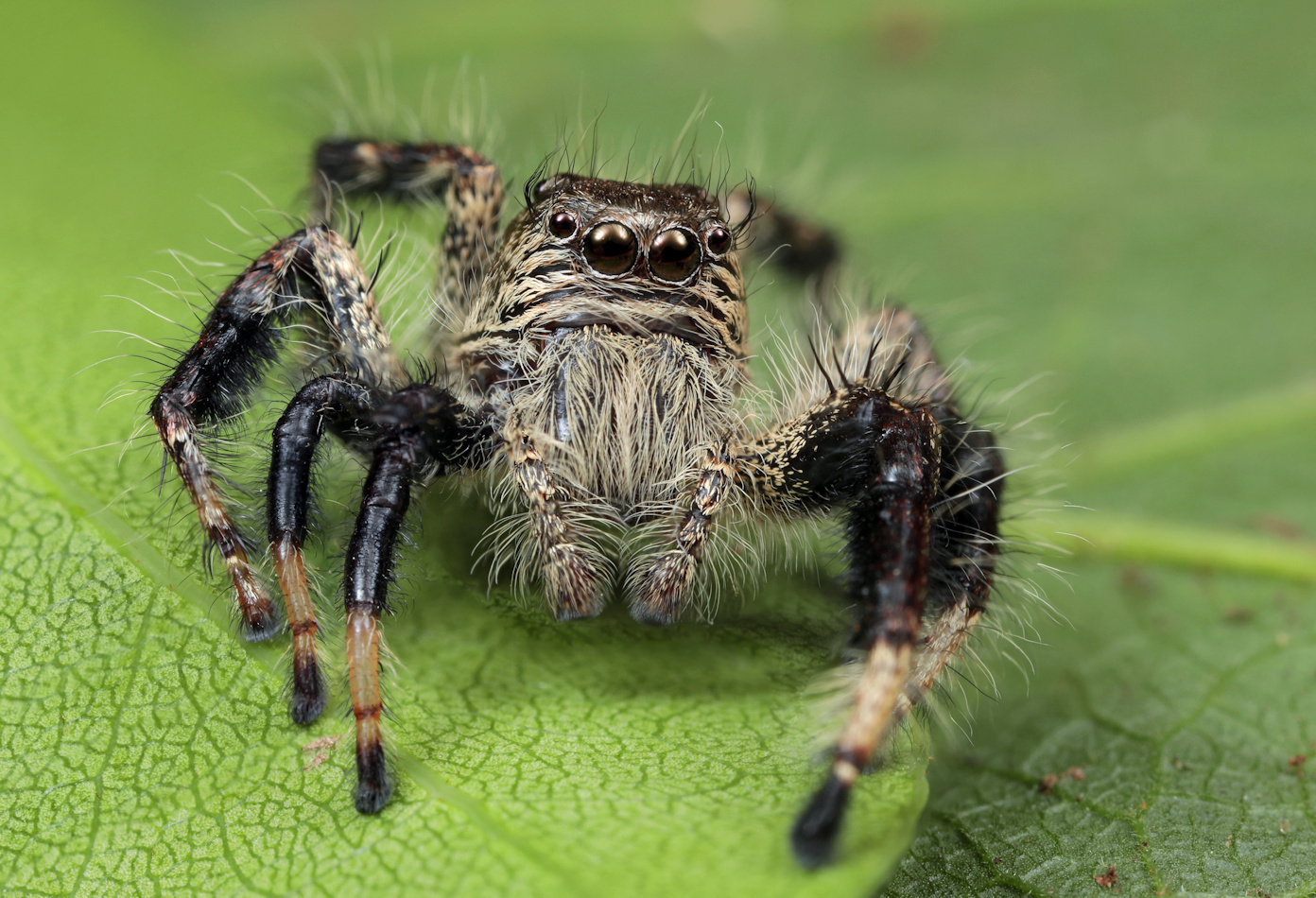
male H. treleaveni

As of October 2025, this genus includes 74 species and two subspecies:

- Hyllus acutus (Blackwall, 1877) – Comoros, Seychelles
- Hyllus aegyptiacus (Denis, 1947) – Egypt
- Hyllus africanus Lessert, 1927 – Guinea, Ghana, Nigeria, DR Congo, Tanzania, Zimbabwe, Mozambique
- Hyllus albofasciatus Thorell, 1899 – Cameroon
- Hyllus albomarginatus (Lenz, 1886) – Madagascar
- Hyllus albooculatus (Vinson, 1863) – Madagascar
- Hyllus alboplagiatus Thorell, 1899 – Cameroon
- Hyllus angustivulvus Caporiacco, 1940 – Ethiopia
- Hyllus argyrotoxus Simon, 1902 – Ivory Coast, Uganda, Kenya, Tanzania, Namibia, Botswana, Zimbabwe, Mozambique, South Africa, Eswatini
- Hyllus atroniveus Caporiacco, 1940 – Ethiopia
- Hyllus aubryi (Lucas, 1858) – Gabon
- Hyllus bifasciatus Ono, 1993 – Madagascar
- Hyllus bisulcus Haddad, Wiśniewski & Wesołowska, 2024 – Tanzania, Mozambique
- Hyllus bos (Sundevall, 1833) – India
- Hyllus brevitarsis Simon, 1902 – Ivory Coast, Ethiopia, Somalia, Uganda, Tanzania, Namibia, Botswana, Zimbabwe, Mozambique, South Africa
- Hyllus congoensis Lessert, 1927 – Guinea, Sierra Leone, Ivory Coast, Cameroon, DR Congo, Uganda, Mozambique
- Hyllus cornutus (Blackwall, 1866) – Senegal, south-east equatorial Africa
- Hyllus decellei Wanless & Clark, 1975 – Ivory Coast
- Hyllus decoratus Thorell, 1887 – Myanmar
- Hyllus deyrollei (Lucas, 1858) – Gabon, Ivory Coast, Nigeria, Mozambique
- Hyllus diardi (Walckenaer, 1837) – China, Myanmar, Thailand, Laos, Vietnam, Malaysia, Philippines, Indonesia
  - H. d. borneensis (Thorell, 1892) – Borneo (no details)
- Hyllus dotatus (G. W. Peckham & E. G. Peckham, 1903) – Sudan, Ivory Coast, Ghana, Ethiopia, DR Congo, Uganda, Kenya, Tanzania, Zambia, Namibia, Botswana, Zimbabwe, Mozambique, South Africa, Yemen
- Hyllus duplicidentatus Caporiacco, 1941 – Ethiopia
- Hyllus flavescens Simon, 1902 – South Africa
- Hyllus formosus Wiśniewski & Wesołowska, 2024 – Uganda
- Hyllus ghanensis Wawer & Wesołowska, 2025 – Ghana
- Hyllus giganteus C. L. Koch, 1846 – Indonesia, (Sumatra) (type species)
  - H. g. whitei Thorell, 1877 – Indonesia (Sulawesi)
- Hyllus grandis (Wesołowska & Russell-Smith, 2011) – Ivory Coast, Ghana, Nigeria
- Hyllus gulosus (Simon, 1877) – Philippines
- Hyllus holochalceus Simon, 1909 – Equatorial Guinea (Bioko)
- Hyllus interrogationis (Strand, 1907) – Madagascar
- Hyllus jallae Pavesi, 1897 – Zambia, Botswana, Zimbabwe
- Hyllus juanensis Strand, 1907 – Madagascar
- Hyllus keratodes (van Hasselt, 1882) – Indonesia (Sumatra)
- Hyllus leucomelas (Lucas, 1858) – Senegal, Guinea-Bissau, Guinea, Ivory Coast, Cameroon, Gabon, DR Congo, Uganda
- Hyllus longiusculus (Thorell, 1899) – Cameroon
- Hyllus lwoffi Berland & Millot, 1941 – Guinea, Ivory Coast, Ghana, Mozambique
- Hyllus madagascariensis (Vinson, 1863) – Madagascar
- Hyllus minahassae Merian, 1911 – Indonesia (Sulawesi)
- Hyllus mniszechi (Lucas, 1858) – Gabon
- Hyllus multiaculeatus Caporiacco, 1949 – Kenya
- Hyllus nebulosus G. W. Peckham & E. G. Peckham, 1907 – Malaysia (Borneo)
- Hyllus nigeriensis (Wesołowska & Edwards, 2012) – Nigeria
- Hyllus nummularis (Gerstaecker, 1873) – Tanzania (Zanzibar)
- Hyllus ornatus Haddad, Wiśniewski & Wesołowska, 2024 – Mozambique
- Hyllus peckhamorum Berland & Millot, 1941 – Ivory Coast, Ghana
- Hyllus plexippoides Simon, 1906 – Guinea to Sudan, DR Congo, Kenya, Zambia
- Hyllus pudicus Thorell, 1895 – India, Myanmar
- Hyllus pulcherrimus G. W. Peckham & E. G. Peckham, 1907 – Malaysia (Borneo)
- Hyllus qishuoi Xiong, Liu & Zhang, 2017 – China
- Hyllus ramadanii Wesołowska & Russell-Smith, 2000 – Kenya, Tanzania
- Hyllus remotus Wesołowska & Russell-Smith, 2011 – Nigeria
- Hyllus robinsoni Hogg, 1919 – Indonesia (Sumatra)
- Hyllus rotundithorax Wesołowska & Russell-Smith, 2000 – Tanzania
- Hyllus sansibaricus Roewer, 1951 – Tanzania (Zanzibar)
- Hyllus semicupreus (Simon, 1885) – India, Sri Lanka, Nepal
- Hyllus senegalensis (C. L. Koch, 1846) – Senegal
- Hyllus shanhonghani Lin & Li, 2022 – China
- Hyllus simplex Haddad, Wiśniewski & Wesołowska, 2024 – Mozambique
- Hyllus solus Wesołowska & Russell-Smith, 2022 – Ivory Coast
- Hyllus stigmatias (L. Koch, 1875) – Ethiopia
- Hyllus suillus Thorell, 1899 – Cameroon
- Hyllus taysonensis Hoang, 2025 – Vietnam
- Hyllus tetensis Haddad, Wiśniewski & Wesołowska, 2024 – Mozambique
- Hyllus thoracicus (Thorell, 1899) – Cameroon
- Hyllus tirapensis (B. Biswas & K. Biswas, 2006) – India
- Hyllus treleaveni G. W. Peckham & E. G. Peckham, 1902 – Guinea, Ivory Coast, DR Congo, Kenya, Tanzania, Angola, Zambia, Namibia, Botswana, Zimbabwe, Mozambique, South Africa
- Hyllus tuberculatus Wanless & Clark, 1975 – Guinea, Ivory Coast, Uganda
- Hyllus unicolor Wesołowska & Russell-Smith, 2022 – Guinea, Ivory Coast
- Hyllus viduatus Caporiacco, 1940 – Ethiopia
- Hyllus vietnamensis Hoang, 2025 – Vietnam
- Hyllus vinsoni (G. W. Peckham & E. G. Peckham, 1885) – Madagascar
- Hyllus walckenaeri (White, 1846) – Indonesia (Sulawesi)
- Hyllus zabkai Hoang, 2025 – Vietnam
