= Taxonomic rank =

Hierarchical level in biological classification

The major ranks: domain, kingdom, phylum, class, order, family, genus, and species, applied to the red fox, Vulpes vulpes. Many classifications based on genetic analysis require more than these eight ranks, not all of which have distinct names.

In biological taxonomy, a taxonomic rank determines the level that a group of organisms—either taxon or clade—occupies in a hierarchical system of classification, which is usually but not necessarily based on evolutionary relationships between those organisms. Some authors prefer to use the term nomenclatural rank, contending that, according to some definitions, the hierarchical rank occupied by a group of organisms is more accurately described as concept of nomenclature rather than taxonomy. In general, the most inclusive taxa (or clades), such as the Eukarya and Animalia, are assigned the highest ranks in a particular system of taxonomy, whereas the least inclusive ones, such as Homo sapiens, Bufo bufo, Tyrannosaurus rex, and Vulpes vulpes, are given the lowest ranks.

Ranks can be either "absolute", in which a pre-defined set of several descriptive terms (such as species, genus, tribe, family, order, class, phylum, kingdom, and domain) constitutes the set of allowable ranks for taxa; or "relative", where ranks are designated instead by an indented taxonomy in which the level of indentation reflects the rank. In a relative system, the rank of a taxon is not necessarily an inherent attribute of the taxon so much as an attribute of a particular indented/nested hierarchy defining the relations between different groups. Additionally, relative systems of taxonomic rank often allow indefinitely adding further nested taxa to allow finer distinctions to be captured as needed.

Rank-based codes (such as the Zoological Code, the Botanical Code, the Code for Cultivated Plants, the Prokaryotic Code, and the Code for Viruses) all require absolute ranks, but absolute ranks are not required in all nomenclatural systems—the PhyloCode (of phylogenetic nomenclature), for instance, does not require absolute ranks.

== Example ==
Consider a particular species, the red fox, Vulpes vulpes, and its classification and ranking in context of the Zoological Code: the specific epithet vulpes (the second word, with small v) identifies the particular species vulpes (red fox) as found in the genus Vulpes (the first word, capital V); this genus groups all species of the "true" foxes at a rank assigned one level above that of the species vulpes. The closest relatives of the foxes are grouped in the family taxon Canidae, which also includes dogs, wolves, and jackals. The next higher taxon but one in the hierarchy is the order Carnivora, which includes the suborder caniforms: all those mentioned above plus bears, seals, weasels, skunks, and raccoons; and the suborder feliforms: cats, civets, hyenas, mongooses.

Carnivora are, in turn, one group of the hairy, warm-blooded, nursing members of the class Mammalia. Mammalia, in turn, are included among the animals with notochords in the phylum Chordata. And all those listed above are collected among all animals in the kingdom Animalia. Finally at the highest rank, all the above are grouped together with all other organisms possessing cell nuclei in the domain taxon Eukarya.

More generally, taxa describe and portray the hierarchical grouping of organisms resulting from the classification process; and the assigned ranks of the taxa indicate the relative positions of such groups within the hierarchy. High-ranking taxa (e.g., domains or kingdoms) contain more sub-taxa groups than lower-ranking taxa, such as phyla or genera—as illustrated by the inverted pyramid graphic of taxonomic rank. And species, or any subspecies, contain the least number of sub-taxa groups, or none at all. The ranking of a given taxon reflects the evolutionary inheritance and derivation from an ancestor common with other taxa, often reflected in traits or molecular features of the organism.

== History ==
Older approaches to taxonomic classification were phenomenological, forming groups on the basis of similarities in appearance, organic structure and behavior.

In his landmark publications, such as the 10th edition of his Systema Naturae, Carl Linnaeus used and popularized a ranking scale limited to kingdom, class, order, genus, species, and one subspecific rank, variety.

A pattern of groups nested within groups was specified by Linnaeus' classifications of plants and animals, and these patterns began to be represented as tree diagrams of the animal and plant kingdoms toward the end of the 18th century, well before Charles Darwin's On the Origin of Species was published. The classification structure used in Systema Naturae did not entail any generating or originating process such as evolution, but instead relied on observable characteristics and primarily served as a guide to quickly identify samples by species.

With Darwin's theory, it was soon generally accepted that a classification should reflect the Darwinian principle of common descent.

One of the first modern groups tied to fossil ancestors was birds. Using the then newly discovered fossils of Archaeopteryx and Hesperornis, Thomas Henry Huxley pronounced that they had evolved from dinosaurs, a group formally named by Richard Owen in 1842. The resulting description, that of dinosaurs "giving rise to" or being "the ancestors of" birds, is the essential hallmark of evolutionary taxonomic thinking.

=== 20th century onwards ===
With the modern evolutionary synthesis of the early 1940s, an essentially modern understanding of the evolution of the major groups was in place. As evolutionary taxonomy is based on Linnaean taxonomic ranks; the two terms are largely interchangeable in modern use.

The cladistic method has emerged since the 1960s. In 1958, Julian Huxley used the term clade, and later, in 1960, Cain and Harrison introduced the term cladistic. The salient feature is the arrangement of taxa in a hierarchical evolutionary tree, with the desired objective of all named taxa being monophyletic (based on a common ancestor). A taxon is called monophyletic if it includes all the descendants of an ancestral form. Groups that have descendant groups removed from them are termed paraphyletic, while groups representing more than one branch from the tree of life are called polyphyletic.

Monophyletic groups are recognized and diagnosed on the basis of synapomorphies, shared derived character states.

Today, the nomenclature is regulated by the nomenclature codes.

Cladistic classifications are compatible with traditional Linnean taxonomy and the Codes of Zoological and Botanical nomenclature, to a certain extent. An alternative system of nomenclature, the International Code of Phylogenetic Nomenclature or PhyloCode, has been proposed, which regulates the formal naming of clades. Linnaean ranks are optional and have no formal standing under the PhyloCode, which is intended to coexist with the current, rank-based codes. While popularity of phylogenetic nomenclature has grown steadily in the last few decades, it remains to be seen whether a majority of systematists will eventually adopt the PhyloCode or continue using the current systems of nomenclature that have been employed (and modified, but arguably not as much as some systematists wish) for over 250 years.

Two important new methods, developed in the second half of the 20th century, drastically changed taxonomic practice:

1. The advent of cladistics, which stemmed from the works of the German entomologist Willi Hennig. Cladistics is a method of classification of life forms according to the proportion of characteristics that they have in common (called synapomorphies). It is assumed that the higher the proportion of characteristics that two organisms share, the more recently they diverged from a common ancestor.
2. Molecular systematics, based on genetic analysis, which can provide much additional data that prove especially useful when few phenotypic characters can resolve relationships, as, for instance, in many viruses, bacteria and archaea, or to resolve relationships between taxa that arose in a fast evolutionary radiation that occurred long ago, such as the main taxa of placental mammals.

Domains are a relatively new grouping, so named by Carl Woese in 1990 as a formal way to systematise the separation of Archaea from Bacteria in the three-domain system. In the 2020s, the domain is now widely used as a fundamental rank. Both regio and dominium have been proposed as the Latin form, and it was adopted into the International Code of Nomenclature of Prokaryotes in 2023 with the Latin form dominium.

== Relative systems of taxonomic rank ==
In systems of relative taxonomic rank, ranks are designated instead an indented taxonomy in which the level of indentation reflects the rank. In a relative system, the rank of a taxon is not necessarily an inherent attribute of the taxon so much as an attribute of a particular indented/nested hierarchy defining the relations between different groups. Additionally, relative systems of taxonomical rank often allow indefinitely adding further nested taxa to allow finer distinctions to be captured as needed.

The PhyloCode, which governs phylogenetic nomenclature, does not assign absolute ranks to the taxa defined thereunder. Instead, taxa above the species-level are defined cladistically, based on their evolutionary relationships to known species, and these defined clades naturally fall into a relative hierarchy, allowing for distinctions between groups to be made on as precise a level as desired, and for those groups to be indefinitely nested, rather than being limited to a pre-defined list of absolute taxonomic ranks.

== Absolute systems of taxonomic rank ==
The International Code of Zoological Nomenclature defines rank as: "The level, for nomenclatural purposes, of a taxon in a taxonomic hierarchy (e.g. all families are for nomenclatural purposes at the same rank, which lies between superfamily and subfamily)." Note that discussions on this page generally assume that taxa are clades (monophyletic groups of organisms), but such is not required by either the Zoological Code or the Botanical Code, (i.e., the International Code of Nomenclature for algae, fungi, and plants); and some experts on biological nomenclature hold that it should not be required. And in that case, the hierarchy of taxa—hence, their ranks—would not necessarily reflect the hierarchy of clades.

A taxon is usually assigned a rank when it is given its formal name. The basic ranks are species and genus. When an organism is given a species name it is assigned to a genus, and the genus name is part of the species name. The species name is thus also called a binomial, that is, a two-term name. For example, the zoological name for the human species is Homo sapiens. This is usually italicized in print or underlined when italics are not available. In this case, Homo is the generic name and it is capitalized; sapiens indicates the species and it is not capitalized. When a subspecific epithet is used, it is placed after the specific name, and uncapitalised and italicised like the specific epithet; the resulting subspecific name is sometimes called a trinomen. For instance, modern humans are Homo sapiens sapiens, or H. sapiens sapiens.

In zoological nomenclature, higher taxon names are normally not italicized, but the Botanical Code, the Prokaryotic Code, the Code for Viruses, the draft BioCode and the PhyloCode all recommend italicizing all taxon names (of all ranks).

The binomial name is basic; which means that to identify a given organism, it is usually not necessary to specify the names of ranks other than the first two—genus and species (i.e., genus and specific epithet)—within a taxonomy comprising a rank-based code. This is not true globally because most rank-based codes are independent of each other, and there are many inter-code homonyms (i.e., the same name used for different organisms among the several codes)—typically for an animal or for a taxon covered by a given rank-based code. For this reason, attempts were made at creating a BioCode that would regulate all taxon names; but this mission has failed thus far due largely to firmly entrenched naming traditions among the communities.

== Fundamental ranks ==
There are 7 (or sometimes 8) ranks common to almost every popular modern system of absolute taxonomic ranks. These include seven main taxonomic ranks: kingdom, phylum or division, class, order, family, genus, and species; these seven ranks are often preceded by an eighth fundamental rank, that of domain, which was proposed by Carl Woese in 1990; both regio and dominium have been proposed for the corresponding Latin form, and the International Code of Nomenclature of Prokaryotes adopted the rank with a Latin form of dominium in 2023. The Latin plurals have been added for ease of understanding.

Main taxonomic ranks
Latin	Latin (plural)	English
dominium/regio (unofficial)	dominia, regiones	domain
regnum	regna	kingdom
phylum	phyla	phylum / division (in botany)
classis	classes	class
ordo	ordines	order
familia	familiae	family
genus	genera	genus
species	species	species

=== Mnemonics ===
There are several mnemonics intended to help memorise the taxonomic hierarchy in English. One common example is "Dear King Phillip Came Over For Good Soup", standing for the initial letters/sounds in Domain, Kingdom, Phylum, Class, Order, Family, Genus, Species. This particular example has many popular variations that substitute "good" for "great", or "soup" for a different food item starting with "S", such as "spaghetti" or "sandwiches".

== Intermediate and alternative ranks ==
Because evolutionary relationships are empirical, taxonomists occasionally need to introduce new ranks. Different nomenclature codes have different rules pertaining to this. Below is a list of terms used in various fields of study for various intermediate ranks, based on which main rank they are derived from/associated with. (Note: For the general usage of zoological ranks between the phylum and family levels, including many intercalary ranks, see Carroll (1988). For additional intercalary ranks in zoology, see especially Gaffney & Meylan (1988); McKenna & Bell (1997); Milner (1988); Novacek (1986, cit. in Carroll 1988: 499, 629); and Paul Sereno's 1986 classification of ornithischian dinosaurs as reported in Lambert (1990: 149, 159). For botanical ranks, including many intercalary ranks, see Willis & McElwain (2002).)

Upper Ranks
Rank	Domain Empire Realm (Note: virology only)	Kingdom	Phylum Division (Note: botany only)	Class	Division (Note: zoology only) (Note: These are movable ranks, most often inserted between the class and the legion or cohort. Nevertheless, their positioning in the zoological hierarchy may be subject to wide variation. For examples, see the Benton classification of vertebrates Archived 16 January 2019 at the Wayback Machine (2005).)	Legion
Subrank	Superdomain; Domain; Subdomain	Hyperkingdom; Superkingdom; Kingdom; Subkingdom; Infrakingdom; Parvkingdom	Superphylum; Phylum; Subphylum; Infraphylum; Parvphylum/Microphylum	Superclass; Class; Subclass; Infraclass; Subterclass; Parvclass	Superdivision; Division; Subdivision; Infradivision	Superlegion; Legion; Sublegion; Infralegion

Central Ranks
Rank	Cohort (Note: In zoological classification, the cohort and its associated group of ranks are inserted between the class group and the ordinal group. The cohort has also been used between infraorder and family in saurischian dinosaurs (Benton Archived 16 January 2019 at the Wayback Machine 2005). In botanical classification, the cohort group has sometimes been inserted between the division (phylum) group and the class group: see Willis & McElwain (2002: 100–101), or has sometimes been used at the rank of order, and is now considered to be an obsolete name for order: See International Code of Nomenclature for algae, fungi, and plants, Melbourne Code 2012, Article 17.2.)	Order (Note: The supra-ordinal sequence gigaorder–megaorder–capaxorder–hyperorder, and the microorder, in roughly the position most often assigned to the parvorder, has been employed in turtles at least (Gaffney & Meylan 1988), while the parallel sequence magnorder–grandorder–mirorder figures in recently influential classifications of mammals. It is unclear from the sources how these two sequences are to be coordinated (or interwoven) within a unitary zoological hierarchy of ranks. Previously, Novacek (1986) and McKenna-Bell (1997) had inserted mirorders and grandorders between the order and superorder, but Benton (2005) now positions both of these ranks above the superorder.)	Section	Family	Tribe	Genus
Subrank	Megacohort; Supercohort; Cohort; Subcohort; Infracohort	Gigaorder; Magnorder/megaorder; Grandorder/capaxorder; Mirorder or hyperorder; Superorder; Series (Note: ichthyology only); Subseries; Order; Suborder; Infraorder; Parvorder/Microorder; Nanorder; Hypoorder; Minorder	Section; Subsection	Gigafamily; Megafamily; Grandfamily; Hyperfamily; Superfamily; Epifamily; Series (Note: lepidopterology only); Group; Family; Subfamily; Infrafamily	Supertribe; Tribe; Subtribe; Infratribe	"Supergenus"; Genus; Subgenus

Lower Ranks
Rank	Section	Series	Species	Variety/Varietas "Form"/"Morph" Aberration	Form/Forma	"Race"
Subrank	Section; Subsection	Series; Subseries	"Species complex"; Species; Subspecies/"forma specialis" (Note: mycology only)/"pathovar" (Note: bacteriology only) (Note: Additionally, the terms Biovar, Morphovar, Phagovar, and Serovar designate bacterial strains (genetic variants) that are physiologically or biochemically distinctive. These are not taxonomic ranks, but are groupings of various sorts which may define a bacterial subspecies.)	Variety; Subvariety	Form; Subform	"Race"; "Subrace"

The terms are unique to a specific field are marked with footnotes as follows:

=== Ranks in zoology ===
There are rules applying to the following taxonomic ranks in the International Code of Zoological Nomenclature: superfamily, family, subfamily, tribe, subtribe, genus, subgenus, species, subspecies.

The International Code of Zoological Nomenclature divides names into "family-group names", "genus-group names", and "species-group names". The Code explicitly mentions the following ranks for these categories:

- Family-groups
  - Superfamily (-oidea)
  - Family (-idae)
  - Subfamily (-inae)
  - Tribe (-ini)
  - Subtribe (-ina)
- Genus-groups
  - Genus
  - Subgenus
- Species-groups
  - Species
  - Subspecies

The rules in the Code apply to the ranks of superfamily to subspecies, and only to some extent to those above the rank of superfamily. Among "genus-group names" and "species-group names" no further ranks are officially allowed, which creates problems when naming taxa in these groups in speciose clades, such as Rana. Zoologists sometimes use additional terms such as "species group", "species subgroup", "species complex" and "superspecies" for convenience as extra, but unofficial, ranks between the subgenus and species levels in taxa with many species, e.g. the genus Drosophila. (Note the potentially confusing use of "species group" as both a category of ranks as well as an unofficial rank itself. For this reason, Alain Dubois has been using the alternative expressions "nominal-series", "family-series", "genus-series" and "species-series" (among others) at least since 2000.)

At higher ranks (family and above) a lower level may be denoted by adding the prefix "infra", meaning lower, to the rank. For example, infraorder (below suborder) or infrafamily (below subfamily).

=== Names of zoological taxa ===
- A taxon above the rank of species has a scientific name in one part (a uninominal name).
- A species has a name typically composed of two parts (a binomial name or binomen): generic name + specific name; for example Canis lupus. Sometimes the name of a subgenus (in parentheses) can be intercalated between the genus name and the specific epithet, which yields a trinomial name that should not be confused with that of a subspecies. An example is Lithobates (Aquarana) catesbeianus, which designates a species that belongs to the genus Lithobates and the subgenus Aquarana.
- A subspecies has a name composed of three parts (a trinomial name or trinomen): generic name + specific name + subspecific name; for example Canis lupus italicus. As there is only one possible rank below that of species, no connecting term to indicate rank is needed or used.

=== Ranks in botany ===
Botanical ranks categorize organisms based (often) on their relationships (monophyly is not required by that code, which does not even mention the word "monophyly", nor that of "clade"). They start with Kingdom, then move to Division (or Phylum), Class, Order, Family, Genus, and Species. Taxa at each rank generally possess shared characteristics and evolutionary history. Understanding these ranks aids in taxonomy and studying biodiversity.

Ranks in ICN
Rank (English)	Rank (Latin)	Type	Suffix
kingdom	regnum	primary	—N/a
subkingdom	subregnum	further	—N/a
division phylum	divisio	primary	‑phyta -mycota (fungi)
subdivision subphylum	subdivisio	further	‑phytina -mycotina (fungi)
class	classis	primary	‑opsida (plant) ‑phyceae (algae) -mycetes (fungi)
subclass	subclassis	further	‑idae (plant) ‑phycidae (algae) -mycetidae (fungi)
order	ordo	primary	-ales
suborder	subordo	further	-ineae
family	familia	primary	-aceae
subfamily	subfamilia	further	‑oideae
tribe	tribus	secondary	-eae (plant) -ini (animal)
subtribe	subtribus	further	‑inae
genus	—	primary	—N/a
subgenus	—	further	—N/a
section	sectio	secondary	—N/a
subsection	subsectio	further	—N/a
series	—	secondary	—N/a
subseries	—	further	—N/a
species	—	primary	—N/a
subspecies	—	further	—N/a
variety	varietas	secondary	—N/a
subvariety	subvarietas	further	—N/a
form	forma	secondary	—N/a
subform	subforma	further	—N/a

There are definitions of the following taxonomic categories in the International Code of Nomenclature for Cultivated Plants: cultivar group, cultivar, grex.

The rules in the ICN apply primarily to the ranks of family and below, and only to some extent to those above the rank of family.

=== Names of botanical taxa ===
Taxa at the rank of genus and above have a botanical name in one part (unitary name); those at the rank of species and above (but below genus) have a botanical name in two parts (binary name); all taxa below the rank of species have a botanical name in three parts (an infraspecific name). To indicate the rank of the infraspecific name, a "connecting term" is needed. Thus Poa secunda subsp. juncifolia, where "subsp". is an abbreviation for "subspecies", is the name of a subspecies of Poa secunda.

Hybrids can be specified either by a "hybrid formula" that specifies the parentage, or may be given a name. For hybrids receiving a hybrid name, the same ranks apply, prefixed with notho (Greek: 'bastard'), with nothogenus as the highest permitted rank.

==== Outdated names for botanical ranks ====
If a different term for the rank was used in an old publication, but the intention is clear, botanical nomenclature specifies certain substitutions:

- If names were "intended as names of orders, but published with their rank denoted by a term such as": "cohors" [Latin for "cohort"; see also cohort study for the use of the term in ecology], "nixus", "alliance", or "Reihe" instead of "order" (Article 17.2), they are treated as names of orders.
- "Family" is substituted for "order" (ordo) or "natural order" (ordo naturalis) under certain conditions where the modern meaning of "order" was not intended. (Article 18.2)
- "Subfamily" is substituted for "suborder" (subordo) under certain conditions where the modern meaning of "suborder" was not intended. (Article 19.2)
- In a publication prior to 1 January 1890, if only one infraspecific rank is used, it is considered to be that of variety. (Article 37.4) This commonly applies to publications that labelled infraspecific taxa with Greek letters, α, β, γ, etc.

== Examples ==
Classifications of five species follow: the fruit fly familiar in genetics laboratories (Drosophila melanogaster), humans (Homo sapiens), the peas used by Gregor Mendel in his discovery of genetics (Pisum sativum), the "fly agaric" mushroom Amanita muscaria, and the bacterium Escherichia coli. The eight major ranks are given in bold; a selection of minor ranks are given as well.

Rank	Fruit fly	Human	Pea	Fly agaric	E. coli
Domain	Eukarya	Eukarya	Eukarya	Eukarya	Bacteria
Kingdom	Animalia	Animalia	Plantae	Fungi	Pseudomonadati
Phylum or division	Arthropoda	Chordata	Magnoliophyta (Tracheophyta)	Basidiomycota	Pseudomonadota
Subphylum or subdivision	Hexapoda	Vertebrata	Magnoliophytina (Euphyllophytina)	Agaricomycotina	
Class	Insecta	Mammalia	Magnoliopsida (Equisetopsida)	Agaricomycetes	Gammaproteobacteria
Subclass	Pterygota	Theria	Rosidae (Magnoliidae)	Agaricomycetidae	
Superorder	Panorpida	Euarchontoglires			
Order	Diptera	Primates	Fabales	Agaricales	Enterobacterales
Suborder	Brachycera	Haplorrhini			
Family	Drosophilidae	Hominidae	Fabaceae	Amanitaceae	Enterobacteriaceae
Subfamily	Drosophilinae	Homininae	Faboideae	Amanitoideae	
Tribe	Drosophilini	Hominini	Fabeae		
Genus	Drosophila	Homo	Pisum	Amanita	Escherichia
Species	D. melanogaster	H. sapiens	P. sativum	A. muscaria	E. coli

Table notes

- In order to keep the table compact and avoid disputed technicalities, some common and uncommon intermediate ranks are omitted. For example, the mammals of Europe, Africa, and upper North America (except the Virginia opossum) are in class Mammalia, legion Cladotheria, sublegion Zatheria, infralegion Tribosphenida, subclass Theria, clade Eutheria, clade Placentalia – but only Mammalia and Theria are in the table. Legitimate arguments might arise if the commonly used clades Eutheria and Placentalia were both included, over which is the rank "infraclass" and what the other's rank should be, or whether the two names are synonyms.
- The ranks of higher taxa, especially intermediate ranks, are prone to revision as new information about relationships is discovered. For example, the flowering plants have been downgraded from a division (Magnoliophyta) to a subclass (Magnoliidae), and the superorder has become the rank that distinguishes the major groups of flowering plants. The traditional classification of primates (class Mammalia, subclass Theria, infraclass Eutheria, order Primates) has been modified by new classifications such as McKenna and Bell (class Mammalia, subclass Theriformes, infraclass Holotheria) with Theria and Eutheria assigned lower ranks between infraclass and the order Primates. These differences arise because there are few available ranks and many branching points in the fossil record.
- Within species further units may be recognised. Animals may be classified into subspecies (for example, Homo sapiens sapiens, modern humans) or morphs (for example Corvus corax varius morpha leucophaeus, the pied raven). Plants may be classified into subspecies (for example, Pisum sativum subsp. sativum, the garden pea) or varieties (for example, Pisum sativum var. macrocarpon, snow pea), with cultivated plants getting a cultivar name (for example, Pisum sativum var. macrocarpon 'Snowbird'). Bacteria may be classified by strains (for example Escherichia coli O157:H7, a strain that can cause food poisoning).

== Rank-based terminations ==
Taxa above the genus level are often given names based on the type genus, with a standardised termination. The terminations used in forming these names depend on which nomenclatural code is applicable, and also sometimes the kingdom/phylum/class as set out in the table below.

The given pronunciations are the most Anglicized of the existing variants. More Latinate pronunciations are also common, particularly /ɑː/ rather than /eɪ/ for stressed a.

Rank	Viruses	Bacteria and Archaea	Embryophytes (Plants)	Algae	Fungi	Animals
Realm	-viria					
Subrealm	-vira					
Kingdom	-virae	-ati				
Subkingdom	-viretes					
Division/phylum	-viricota /vɪrəˈkoʊtə/	-ota	-ophyta /ˈɒfətə, ə(ˈ)faɪtə/		-mycota /maɪˈkoʊtə/	
Subdivision/subphylum	-viricotina /vɪrəkəˈtaɪnə/		-phytina /fəˈtaɪnə/		-mycotina /maɪkəˈtaɪnə/	
Class	-viricetes /vɪrəˈsiːtiːz/	-ia /iə/	-opsida /ˈɒpsədə/	-phyceae /ˈfaɪʃiː/	-mycetes /maɪˈsiːtiːz/	
Subclass	-viricetidae /vɪrəˈsɛtədiː/	-idae /ədiː/		-phycidae /ˈfɪsədiː/	-mycetidae /maɪˈsɛtədiː/	
Superorder			-anae /ˈeɪniː/			
Order	-virales /vaɪˈreɪliːz/	-ales /ˈeɪliːz/				-ida /ədə/ or -iformes /ə(ˈ)fɔːrmiːz/
Suborder	-virineae /vəˈrɪniːiː/	-ineae /ˈɪniːiː/				
Infraorder			-aria /ˈɛəriə/			
Superfamily			-acea /ˈeɪʃə/			-oidea /ˈɔɪdiːə/
Family	-viridae /ˈvɪrədiː/	-aceae /ˈeɪʃiː/				-idae /ədiː/
Subfamily	-virineae /vɪˈrɪniːiː/		-oideae /ˈɔɪdiːiː/			-inae /ˈaɪniː/
Tribe		-eae /iːiː/				-ini /ˈaɪnaɪ/
Subtribe		-inae /ˈaɪniː/				-ina /ˈaɪnə/
Genus	-virus					
Subgenus	-virus					

Table notes

- In botany and mycology names at the rank of family and below are based on the name of a genus, sometimes called the type genus of that taxon, with a standard ending. For example, the rose family, Rosaceae, is named after the genus Rosa, with the standard ending "-aceae" for a family. Names above the rank of family may also be formed from a generic name, or they may be descriptive, like Gymnospermae or Fungi.
- Similarly, in zoology, names up to the rank of superfamily are produced by combining a stem based on the name of the type genus with a standard suffix. Uniform suffix has been suggested (but not recommended) in AAAS as -ida /ɪdə/ for orders, for example; protozoologists seem to adopt this system. Many metazoan (higher animals) orders also have such suffix, e.g. Hyolithida and Nectaspida (Naraoiida).
- Forming a name based on a type genus's generic name may be not straightforward, as the assorted codes variously prescribe, allow, or disallow the derivation of a stem from the traditional Latin genitive, from the traditional Greek genitive, or from the generic name at face value without reference to Latin or Greek. For example, the homo has the Latin genitive hominis, corresponding to the stem homin- and not *hom-; thus the genus Homo (human) is placed in the family Hominidae and not "Homidae".
- In virology, the formal endings for taxa of viroids, of satellite nucleic acids, and of viriforms are similar to that of viruses, only -vir- in the suffixes above is replaced by -viroid-, -satellit- and -viriform-, respectively.

== Critique and alternatives ==
Ranks are assigned based on subjective dissimilarity, and do not fully reflect the gradational nature of variation within nature. These problems were already identified by Willi Hennig, who advocated dropping them in 1969, and this position gathered support from Graham C. D. Griffiths only a few years later. In fact, these ranks were proposed in a fixist context and the advent of evolution sapped the foundations of this system, as was recognised long ago; the introduction of The Code of Nomenclature and Check-list of North American Birds Adopted by the American Ornithologists' Union published in 1886 states "No one appears to have suspected, in 1842 [when the Strickland code was drafted], that the Linnaean system was not the permanent heritage of science, or that in a few years a theory of evolution was to sap its very foundations, by radically changing men's conceptions of those things to which names were to be furnished." Such ranks are used simply because they are required by the rank-based codes; because of this, some systematists prefer to call them nomenclatural ranks. In most cases, higher taxonomic groupings arise further back in time, simply because the most inclusive taxa necessarily appeared first. Furthermore, the diversity in some major taxa (such as vertebrates and angiosperms) is better known than that of others (such as fungi, arthropods and nematodes) not because they are more diverse than other taxa, but because they are more easily sampled and studied than other taxa, or because they attract more interest and funding for research.

Of these many ranks, many systematists consider that the most basic (or important) is the species, but this opinion is not universally shared. Thus, species are not necessarily more sharply defined than taxa at any other rank, and in fact, given the phenotypic gaps created by extinction, in practice, the reverse is often the case. Ideally, a taxon is intended to represent a clade, that is, the phylogeny of the organisms under discussion, but this is not a requirement of the zoological and botanical codes.

A classification in which all taxa have formal ranks cannot adequately reflect knowledge about phylogeny. Since taxon names are dependent on ranks in rank-based (Linnaean) nomenclature, taxa without ranks cannot be given names. Alternative approaches, such as phylogenetic nomenclature, as implemented under the PhyloCode and supported by the International Society for Phylogenetic Nomenclature, or using circumscriptional names, avoid this problem. The theoretical difficulty with superimposing taxonomic ranks over evolutionary trees is manifested as the boundary paradox which may be illustrated by Darwinian evolutionary models.

There are no rules for how many species should make a genus, a family, or any other higher taxon (that is, a taxon in a category above the species level). It should be a natural group (that is, non-artificial, non-polyphyletic), as judged by a biologist, using all the information available to them. Equally ranked higher taxa in different phyla are not necessarily equivalent in terms of time of origin, phenotypic distinctiveness or number of lower-ranking included taxa (e.g., it is incorrect to assume that families of insects are in some way evolutionarily comparable to families of mollusks). Of all criteria that have been advocated to rank taxa, age of origin has been the most frequently advocated. Willi Hennig proposed it in 1966, but he concluded in 1969 that this system was unworkable and suggested dropping absolute ranks. However, the idea of ranking taxa using the age of origin (either as the sole criterion, or as one of the main ones) persists under the name of time banding, and is still advocated by several authors. For animals, at least the phylum rank is usually associated with a certain body plan; however, this is also ultimately an arbitrary criterion.

== See also ==
- Breed
- Catalogue of Life (a database)
- Cladistics
- Landrace
- Tree of life (biology)
- Alliance (taxonomy)
- Strain (biology)
