= Evarcha werneri =

Scientific classification
- Kingdom: Animalia
- Phylum: Arthropoda
- Subphylum: Chelicerata
- Class: Arachnida
- Order: Araneae
- Infraorder: Araneomorphae
- Family: Salticidae
- Genus: Evarcha
- Species: E. werneri

Binomial name
- Evarcha werneri (Simon, 1906)

Synonyms
- Stenaelurillus werneri Simon, 1906

Species of jumping spider

Evarcha werneri, which is also known as Werner’s evarcha jumping spider, is a species of jumping spider that is endemic to Africa. Originally allocated to the genus Stenaelurillus with the name Stenaelurillus werneri in 1906, it was transferred to the genus Evarcha in 2018 with its current name. It is a small spider, typically between 3.5 and 5.1 mm (0.14 and 0.20 in) in body length and generally pale yellow apart from a black area around its eyes. The female is larger than the male. The female has a distinctive epigyne, the visible external part of its copulatory organs, that has a wide plate. This distinguishes the species from the otherwise similar Hyllus dotatus. The species are so similar that members of them have been confused, with female specimens of the species being allocated to the now synonymised species Evarcha elegans while male specimens found at the same location were of the species Hyllus dotatus.

== Taxonomy ==
Evarcha werneri is a species of jumping spider, a member of the family Salticidae, that was first described by the arachnologist Eugène Simon in 1906. He allocated it to the genus Stenaelurillus, which he had first circumscribed in 1886 with the name Stenaelurillus werneri. In 2018, Dmitri Logunov and Galina Azarkina undertook a thorough analysis of Stenaelurillus and transferred the species to the genus Evarcha with the name Evarcha werneri. Evarcha was first circumscribed by Simon in 1902. The genus is one of the largest, with members found on four continents.

Meanwhile, in 2000, Wanda Wesołowska and Anthony Russell-Smith had described a species that they named Evarcha elegans. In 2018, Logunov and Azarkina synonymised this species with Evarcha werneri based on the similarity of the female's copulatory organs. However, Konrad Wiśniewski and Wesołowska identified that the specimens used for the description of Evarcha elegans were actually different species and the male was an example of Hyllus dotatus. In 2024, Evarcha elegans was moved from being a synonym of Evarcha werneri to Hyllus dotatus.

In Wayne Maddison's 2015 study of spider phylogenetic classification, the genus Evarcha had been ascribed to the subtribe Plexippina. This is a member of the tribe Plexippini, in the subclade Simonida in the clade Saltafresia. In the following year, Jerzy Prószyński added the genus to a group of genera named Evarchines, named after the genus, along with Hasarinella and Nigorella based on similarities in the spiders' copulatory organs.

The spider is commonly known as Werner's evarcha jumping spider. In his 2018 reassessment of Evarcha werneri and its relatives, Prószyński placed the spider in a new genus, Evawes, in 2018 based on its copulatory organs and the way that they differ from other Evarcha spiders. The new genus name is a combination of Evacha and "Wesołowska". This designation is not widely accepted and the species remains in the Evarcha genus in the World Spider Catalog. The male holotype was stored at the Natural History Museum, Vienna, but it has been lost. The female lectotype is stored in the same museum.

== Description ==
Evarcha werneri is a small spider with a body that is divided into two main parts: a rounded cephalothorax and an ovoid abdomen that is narrower to the rear. The male has a typical body length of 3.5 mm (0.14 in). Its cephalothorax is generally pale yellow with a black area around its eyes. There are stiff, black and long, erect, white hairs near the eyes while yellow-white hairs cover much of the remainder of the carapace, the hard upper part of the cephalothorax. It has a faint band along its back that diminishes towards the rear. The part of the underside of the cephalothorax known as the spider's sternum is yellow, as are many of the spider's mouthparts, including its chelicerae.

The spider's abdomen is short and has a noticeable scutum, or shield, on its back that is shiny. It is covered in black and white hairs and has a pattern consisting of, near the middle, two small spots and, to the rear, another smaller spot. Its underside is paler than its topside. The spider's uppermost spinnerets are black, the remainder being olive-coloured. Its pale yellow legs are darker at their extremities and have black sections. The male's copulatory organs are distinctive. It has white-yellow pedipalps, sensory organs near its mouth, that end in a thick tibia that has a thin protrusion, or tibial apophysis, which ends in a slight curve. Attached to the tibia is an oval cymbium and a large palpal bulb. At the end of the bulb is an embolus that is wider than it is long.

The female is larger than the male, measuring typically 5.1 mm (0.20 in) in total length. It has a carapace that is typically 2.45 mm (0.10 in) long, and 1.7 mm (0.07 in) wide and an abdomen that is 3.05 mm (0.12 in) in length and 1.7 mm (0.07 in) in width. It is generally pale yellow apart from a black area around its eyes. The part of its face known as its clypeus is pale yellow and has no hairs or scales. Its epigyne, the visible external part of its copulatory organs, is wide and has a slightly curved plate. It has wide and membranous insemination ducts that lead to elongated slightly pear-shaped spermathecae, or receptacles, that show signs of sclerotization. The spider is very similar to Hyllus dotatus, differing in the width of the plate on the epigyne. Simon noted the spider's similarity to Stenaelurillus triguttatus.

== Distribution and habitat ==
Evarcha spiders live across the world, although those found in North America may be accidental migrants. Evarcha werneri is endemic to Africa. It has been found in Ethiopia, Guinea, Namibia, South Africa, South Sudan, Tanzania and Uganda. In South Africa, it is known from KwaZulu-Natal and Limpopo. Specimens found in South Africa were sampled from pitfall traps and sweeping grass in the Savanna Biome at altitudes ranging from 16 to 1,360 m (52.49 to 4,461.94 ft) above sea level. In Guinea, it has been seen on the slopes of the Nimba Range living at a height of 1,100 m (3,608.92 ft) above sea level. Its conservation status is considered of least concern.

== Bibliography ==
- Dippenaar-Schoeman, Ansie S.; Van der Walt, Vida; Haddad, Charles R.; Foord, Stefan H.; Lotz, Leon N. (2025). "The Salticidae of South Africa: Part 2 (E-Ha)". South African National Survey of Arachnida Photo Identification Guide. 1: 1–65. doi:10.5281/zenodo.15266589.
- Kropf, Christian; Blick, Theo; Brescovit, Antonio D.; Chatzaki, Maria; Dupérré, Nadine; Gloor, Daniel; Russell-Smith, Charles R.; Harvey, Mark S.; Jäger, Peter; Marusik, Yuri M.; Ono, Hirotsugu; Rheims, Cristina A.; Nentwig, Wolfgang (2019). "How not to delimit taxa: a critique on a recently proposed "pragmatic classification" of jumping spiders (Arthropoda: Arachnida: Araneae: Salticidae)". Zootaxa. 4545 (3): 444–446. doi:10.11646/zootaxa.4545.3.10. PMID 30790913.
- Logunov, Dmitri V.; Azarkina, Galina N. (2018). "Redefinition and partial revision of the genus Stenaelurillus Simon, 1886 (Arachnida, Araneae, Salticidae)". European Journal of Taxonomy. 430: 1–126. doi:10.5852/ejt.2018.430.
- Maddison, Wayne P. (2015). "A phylogenetic classification of jumping spiders (Araneae: Salticidae)". The Journal of Arachnology. 43 (3): 231–292. doi:10.1636/arac-43-03-231-292. S2CID 85680279.
- Maddison, Wayne P .; Hedin, Marshal C. (2003). "Jumping spider phylogeny (Araneae: Salticidae)". Invertebrate Systematics. 17 (4): 529–549. doi:10.1071/IS02044.
- Prószyński, Jerzy (2017). "Pragmatic classification of the World's Salticidae (Araneae)". Ecologica Montenegrina. 12: 1–133. doi:10.37828/em.2017.12.1.
- Prószyński, Jerzy (2018). "Review of genera Evarcha and Nigorella, with comments on Emertonius, Padilothorax [sic], Stagetillus, and description of five new genera and two new species (Araneae: Salticidae)". Ecologica Montenegrina. 16: 130–179. doi:10.37828/em.2018.16.12.
- Simon, Eugène (1906). "Ergebnisse der mit Subvention aus der Erbschaft Treitl unternommenen zoologischen Forschungsreise Dr F. Werner's nach dem ägyptischen Sudan und Nord-Uganda: VII. Araneida" [Results of Dr F. Werner's zoological research trip to the Egyptian Sudan and Northern Uganda, undertaken with a subsidy from the Treitl inheritance VII. Araneida]. Sitzungsberichte der Kaiserlichen Akademie der Wissenschaften, Mathematisch-naturwissenschaftliche Klasse, Wien (115): 1159–1176.
- Wesołowska, Wanda; Henrard, Arnaud (2025). "New data on the jumping spiders (Araneae: Salticidae) from the Nimba Mountains, Guinea". Annales Zoologici. 75 (3): 811–912. doi:10.3161/00034541ANZ2025.75.3.010.
- Wesołowska, Wanda; Russell-Smith, Charles R. (2009). "Jumping spiders (Araneae: Salticidae) of the Ndumo Game Reserve, Maputaland, South Africa". African Invertebrates. 50 (1): 30–103. Bibcode:2009AfrIn..50...13W. doi:10.5733/afin.050.0102. S2CID 85322962.
- Wiśniewski, Konrad; Wesołowska, Wanda (2024). "Jumping spiders (Salticidae) of Uganda – revised list, new species and distributional data". European Journal of Taxonomy (952): 1–171. Bibcode:2024EJTax.952....1W. doi:10.5852/ejt.2024.952.2647.
