= Michel Laurin =

Canadian-born French paleontologist and phylogenetic taxonomist

- Born: Michel Laurin; St. Jerome, Canada
- Education: University of Toronto
- Scientific career
- Workplaces: Muséum National d'Histoire Naturelle

Michel Laurin is a Canadian-born French vertebrate paleontologist whose specialities include the emergence of a land-based lifestyle among vertebrates, the evolution of body size and the origin and phylogeny of lissamphibians. He has also made important contributions to the literature on phylogenetic nomenclature.

As an undergraduate, he worked in the laboratory of Robert L. Carroll and earned his Ph.D. at the University of Toronto under the direction of Robert R. Reisz; his thesis concerned the osteology of seymouriamorphs. His 1991 review of diapsid phylogeny provided the broadest review of the subject up to that date. In 1995, Laurin and Reisz coauthored a widely cited article providing evidence that the synapsids are the sister group of all other amniotes. He later worked on untangling the phylogeny of the Stegocephalia, a group with a notoriously difficult phylogeny. He later moved to France; since 1998, he has been a CNRS researcher at the Muséum National d'Histoire Naturelle.

He is an editor-in-chief of Comptes Rendus Palevol, a journal in the Comptes Rendus de l'Académie des Sciences family, as well as being a reviewing editor for the Journal of Evolutionary Biology. He has been a key contributor to the International Society for Phylogenetic Nomenclature, where he served as president 2008–2009 and as secretary 2010–2011.
