= PhyloCode =

Proposed code of nomenclature for clades

The International Code of Phylogenetic Nomenclature, known as the PhyloCode for short, is a formal set of rules governing phylogenetic nomenclature. It is specifically designed to regulate the naming of clades, leaving the governance of species names up to the rank-based nomenclature codes (ICN, ICNCP, ICNP, ICZN, ICVCN).

The PhyloCode is associated with the International Society for Phylogenetic Nomenclature (ISPN). The companion volume, Phylonyms, was published in 2020, establishing the first 300 clade names under the PhyloCode. RegNum is an associated online database for registered clade names.

The PhyloCode regulates phylogenetic nomenclature by providing rules for deciding which associations of names and definitions are considered established, which of those will be considered homonyms or synonyms, and which one of a set of synonyms or homonyms will be considered accepted (generally the one registered first; see below). The PhyloCode only governs the naming of clades, not of paraphyletic or polyphyletic groups, and only allows the use of specimens, species, and apomorphies as specifiers (anchors).

== Phylogenetic nomenclature ==
Unlike rank-based nomenclatural codes (ICN, ICZN, ICNB), the PhyloCode does not require the use of ranks, although it does optionally allow their use. The rank-based codes define taxa using a rank (such as genus, family, etc.) and, in many cases, a type specimen or type subtaxon. The exact content of a taxon, other than the type, is not specified by the rank-based codes.

In contrast, under phylogenetic nomenclature, the content of taxa are delimited using a definition that is based on phylogeny (i.e., ancestry and descent) and uses specifiers (e.g., species, specimens, apomorphies) to indicate actual organisms. The formula of the definition indicates an ancestor. The defined taxon, then, is that ancestor and all of its descendants. Thus, the content of a phylogenetically defined taxon relies on a phylogenetic hypothesis.

The following are examples of types of phylogenetic definition (capital letters indicate specifiers):

- Minimum-clade definition (formerly node-based): "the clade originating with the most recent common ancestor of A and B" or "the smallest clade containing A and B"
- Maximum-clade definition (formerly branch-based or stem-based): "the clade consisting of A and all organisms or species that share a more recent common ancestor with A than with Z" or "the clade originating in the earliest ancestor of A that is not an ancestor of Z" or "the largest clade containing A but not Z".
- Apomorphy-based definition: "the clade originating in the ancestor in which apomorphy M, as inherited by A, originated" or "the clade for which M, as inherited by A, is an apomorphy" or "the clade characterized by apomorphy M as inherited by A".

Other types of definition are possible as well, taking into account not only organisms' phylogenetic relations and apomorphies but also whether or not related organisms are extant.

The following table gives examples of phylogenetic definitions of clades that also have ranks in traditional nomenclature. When all the specifiers in a node-based definition are extant specimens or species, as in the following definition of Mammalia, a crown group is defined. (The traditional definition of Mammalia is less restrictive, including some fossil groups outside of the crown group.)

Name	Rank	Type	Phylogenetic definition
Hadrosauridae	Family	Hadrosaurus; Leidy 1858	The smallest clade containing Hadrosaurus foulkii Leidy 1858, Lambeosaurus lambei Parks 1923, and Saurolophus osborni Brown 1912.
Mammalia	Class	N/A	The smallest crown clade containing Homo sapiens Linnaeus 1758 (Placentalia), Didelphis marsupialis Linnaeus 1758 (Marsupialia), and Tachyglossus aculeatus (Shaw 1792) (Monotremata).

== Versions ==
PhyloCode has gone through several revisions. As of November 2023, the current version is 6, released on the website on June 8, 2020.

== Organization ==
As with other nomenclatural codes, the rules of the PhyloCode are organized as articles, which in turn are organized as chapters. Each article may also contain notes, examples, and recommendations.

=== Table of contents ===
- Preface (including Literature Cited)
- Preamble
- Division I. Principles
- Division II. Rules
  - Chapter I. Taxa (Arts. 1–3)
  - Chapter II. Publication (Arts. 4–5)
  - Chapter III. Names (Arts. 6–8)
  - Chapter IV. Clade Names (Arts. 9–11)
  - Chapter V. Selection of Established Names (Arts. 12–15)
  - Chapter VI. Provisions for Hybrids (Art. 16)
  - Chapter VII. Orthography (Arts. 17–18)
  - Chapter VIII. Authorship of Names (Art. 19)
  - Chapter IX. Citation of Authors and Registration Numbers (Art. 20)
  - Chapter X. Species Names (Art. 21)
  - Chapter XI. Governance (Art. 22)
- Glossary
- Appendices
  - Appendix A. Registration Procedures and Data Requirements
  - Appendix B. Code of Ethics

== Registration database ==
The PhyloCode is associated with a registration database, called RegNum, which stores all clade names and definitions that are considered acceptable.

== History ==
(Condensed from the PhyloCode's Preface.)

The PhyloCode grew out of a workshop at Harvard University in August 1998, where decisions were made about its scope and content. Many of the workshop participants, together with several other people who subsequently joined the project, served as an advisory group. In April 2000, a draft was made public on the web and comments were solicited from the scientific community.

A second workshop was held at Yale University in July 2002, at which some modifications were made in the rules and recommendations of the PhyloCode. Other revisions have been made from time to time as well.

The First International Phylogenetic Nomenclature Meeting, which took place from July 6 to July 9, 2004, in Paris, France, was attended by about 70 systematic and evolutionary biologists from 11 nations. This was the first open, multi-day conference that focused entirely on phylogenetic nomenclature, and it provided the venue for the inauguration of a new association, the International Society for Phylogenetic Nomenclature (ISPN). The ISPN membership elects the Committee on Phylogenetic Nomenclature (CPN), which has taken over the role of the advisory group that oversaw the earlier stages of development of the PhyloCode.

The Second International Phylogenetic Nomenclature Meeting took place from June 28, 2006, to July 2, 2006, at Yale University (New Haven, Connecticut, U.S.).

The Third International Phylogenetic Nomenclature Meeting took place from July 21, 2008, to July 22, 2008, at Dalhousie University (Halifax, Nova Scotia, Canada).

The PhyloCode went into effect with the publication of the companion volume, Phylonyms, in 2020.

=== Influences ===
The theoretical foundation of the PhyloCode was developed in a series of papers by de Queiroz and Gauthier, which was foreshadowed by earlier suggestions that a taxon name could be defined by reference to a part of a phylogenetic tree.

Whenever possible, the writers of the PhyloCode used the draft BioCode, which attempted to unify the rank-based approach into a single code, as a model. Thus, the organization of the PhyloCode, some of its terminology, and the wording of certain rules are derived from the BioCode. Other rules are derived from one or more of the rank-based codes, particularly the botanical and zoological codes. However, many rules in the PhyloCode have no counterpart in any code based on taxonomic ranks because of fundamental differences in the definitional foundations of the alternative systems. Note that the PhyloCode does not govern the names of species, whose rules of availability, typification, etc., remain regulated by the requisite traditional Code of Nomenclature.

== Future ==
The PhyloCode is controversial and has inspired considerable criticism from some taxonomists. While inaugurated decades ago, the number of supporters for widespread adoption of the PhyloCode is still small, and the publication of PhyloCode literature stagnated in the mid-2010s, before accelerating after publication of Phylonyms in 2020 and of the launch of the Bulletin of Phylogenetic Nomenclature, which is a journal dedicated to the publication of nomenclatural acts (especially definition of taxon names) valid under the PhyloCode. To be valid under the PhyloCode, taxon names and associated definitions should be registered in the RegNum database.

A list of published critiques of the PhyloCode can be found on the ISPN's website, as can a list of rebuttals.

== Literature ==
- Anderson, J. S. (2002). "Use of well-known names in phylogenetic nomenclature: a reply to Laurin". Syst. Biol. 51 (5): 822–827. doi:10.1080/10635150290102447. PMID 12396594.
- Baum, D. A.; W. S. Alverson; R. Nyffeler (1998). "A durian by any other name: taxonomy and nomenclature of the core Malvales". Harvard Papers in Botany. 3: 315–330. ISSN 1043-4534.
- Benton, M. J. (2000). "Stems, nodes, crown clades, and rank-free lists: is Linnaeus dead?". Biological Reviews. 75 (4): 633–648. doi:10.1111/j.1469-185X.2000.tb00055.x. ISSN 0006-3231. PMID 11117201. S2CID 17851383. Archived from the original on 2011-06-05.
- Cantino, Philip D. (2000). "Phylogenetic nomenclature: addressing some concerns". Taxon. 49 (1). International Association for Plant Taxonomy (IAPT): 85–93. Bibcode:2000Taxon..49...85C. doi:10.2307/1223935. JSTOR 1223935.
- Cantino, Philip D. (2004). "Classifying species versus naming clades". Taxon. 53 (3). International Association for Plant Taxonomy (IAPT): 795–798. Bibcode:2004Taxon..53..795C. doi:10.2307/4135453. JSTOR 4135453.
- Carpenter, J. M. (2003). "Critique of pure folly". The Botanical Review. 69 (1): 79–92. doi:10.1663/0006-8101(2003)069[0079:COPF]2.0.CO;2. ISSN 0006-8101. S2CID 40505806.
- de Queiroz, K. (1992). "Phylogenetic definitions and taxonomic philosophy". Biol. Philos. 7 (3): 295–313. doi:10.1007/BF00129972. S2CID 36728162.
- de Queiroz, K. (2006). "The PhyloCode and the distinction between taxonomy and nomenclature". Syst. Biol. 55 (1): 160–162. doi:10.1080/10635150500431221. PMID 16507533.
- de Queiroz, K.; P. D. Cantino (2001). "Phylogenetic nomenclature and the PhyloCode". Bull. Zool. Nomencl. 58: 254–271. ISSN 0007-5167.
- de Queiroz, K.; J. Gauthier (1990). "Phylogeny as a central principle in taxonomy: Phylogenetic definitions of taxon names". Syst. Zool. 39 (4). Society of Systematic Biologists: 307–322. doi:10.2307/2992353. JSTOR 2992353.
- de Queiroz, K.; J. Gauthier. (1992). "Phylogenetic taxonomy". Annu. Rev. Ecol. Syst. 23: 449–480. Bibcode:1992AnRES..23..449D. doi:10.1146/annurev.es.23.110192.002313. ISSN 0066-4162.
- de Queiroz, K.; J. Gauthier (1994). "Toward a phylogenetic system of biological nomenclature". Trends Ecol. Evol. 9 (1): 27–31. Bibcode:1994TEcoE...9...27D. doi:10.1016/0169-5347(94)90231-3. PMID 21236760.
- Dominguez, E.; Q. D. Wheeler (1997). "Taxonomic stability is ignorance". Cladistics. 13 (4): 367–372. doi:10.1006/clad.1997.0050. ISSN 0748-3007.
- Donoghue, M. J.; J. A. Gauthier (2004). "Implementing the PhyloCode". Trends Ecol. Evol. 19 (6): 281–282. Bibcode:2004TEcoE..19..281D. doi:10.1016/j.tree.2004.04.004. PMID 16701272.
- Gauthier, J.; K. de Queiroz (2001). "Feathered dinosaurs, flying dinosaurs, crown dinosaurs, and the name "Aves"". In J. A. Gauthier; L. F. Gall (eds.). New perspectives on the origin and early evolution of birds: proceedings of the International Symposium in Honor of John H. Ostrom. New Haven, Connecticut, U.S.A.: Peabody Museum of Natural History, Yale University. pp. 7–41 pp.
- Laurin, M. (2005). "Dites oui au PhyloCode!" (PDF). Bull. Soc. Fr. Syst. 34: 25–31. ISSN 1240-3253. Archived from the original (PDF fulltext) on 2007-08-08.
- Laurin, M.; Philip D. Cantino (2004). "First International Phylogenetic Nomenclature Meeting: a report". Zool. Scr. 33 (5): 475–479. doi:10.1111/j.0300-3256.2004.00176.x. S2CID 86552807.
- Laurin, M.; K. de Queiroz; Philip D. Cantino (2006). "Sense and stability of taxon names". Zool. Scr. 35 (1): 113–114. doi:10.1111/j.1463-6409.2006.00219.x. S2CID 86040732.
- Nordal, I.; B. Stedje (2005). "Letters to the Editor: Paraphyletic taxa should be accepted" (PDF). Taxon. 54 (1): 5–6. doi:10.2307/25065296. ISSN 0040-0262. JSTOR 25065296. Archived from the original (PDF fulltext) on 2006-02-28. including proposal, but without the 150 supporting signatories
- Rieppel, O. (2006). "The PhyloCode: a critical discussion of its theoretical foundation". Cladistics. 22 (2): 186–197. doi:10.1111/j.1096-0031.2006.00097.x. PMID 34892874. S2CID 59463810.
- Sereno, P. C. (1999). "Definitions in phylogenetic taxonomy: critique and rationale". Syst. Biol. 48 (2): 329–351. doi:10.1080/106351599260328. PMID 12066711.
- Sereno, P. C. (2005). "The logical basis of phylogenetic taxonomy". Syst. Biol. 54 (4): 595–619. doi:10.1080/106351591007453. PMID 16109704. S2CID 15050748.
