= International Society for Phylogenetic Nomenclature =

- Type: Professional Organization
- Purpose: Phylogenetic nomenclature
- Method: Meetings, Publications
- Key people: Michel Laurin (current secretary)
- Website: www.phylonames.org

The International Society for Phylogenetic Nomenclature was established to encourage and facilitate the development and use of, and communication about, phylogenetic nomenclature. It organizes periodic scientific meetings and is overseeing the completion and implementation of the PhyloCode.

== History and meetings ==
The International Society for Phylogenetic Nomenclature (ISPN) was established in the first international phylogenetic nomenclature meeting, which convened in the Muséum national d'histoire naturelle, in Paris, on July 6–9, 2004.

In the second meeting (2006), rules concerning the choice of name for crown clades were discussed, along with rules to clarify the use of binomial species names in the context of phylogenetic nomenclature and to enhance the information content of these names (regarding the monophyly or paraphyly of the genus name, considered a prenomen, in the context of the PhyloCode). It was also decided then to expand the CPN (Committee on Phylogenetic Nomenclature) from nine to twelve members.

The third meeting convened at Dalhousie University in Halifax, from July 20 to 22, 2008. The editors of the Companion Volume presented a progress report, and a demonstration of the RegNum on-line registration database was given. Both of these are important to the society because they were required to implement the PhyloCode. Other discussions at the meeting covered the problem of hybrids in rank-based and phylogenetic nomenclature, phyloinformatics, and teaching phylogenetic nomenclature.

Shortly after that meeting, the ISPN was admitted as a scientific member of IUBS, the International Union of Biological Sciences, to which other regulating bodies of biological nomenclature (such as the International Association for Plant Taxonomy and the International Commission on Zoological Nomenclature, among others) also belong.
