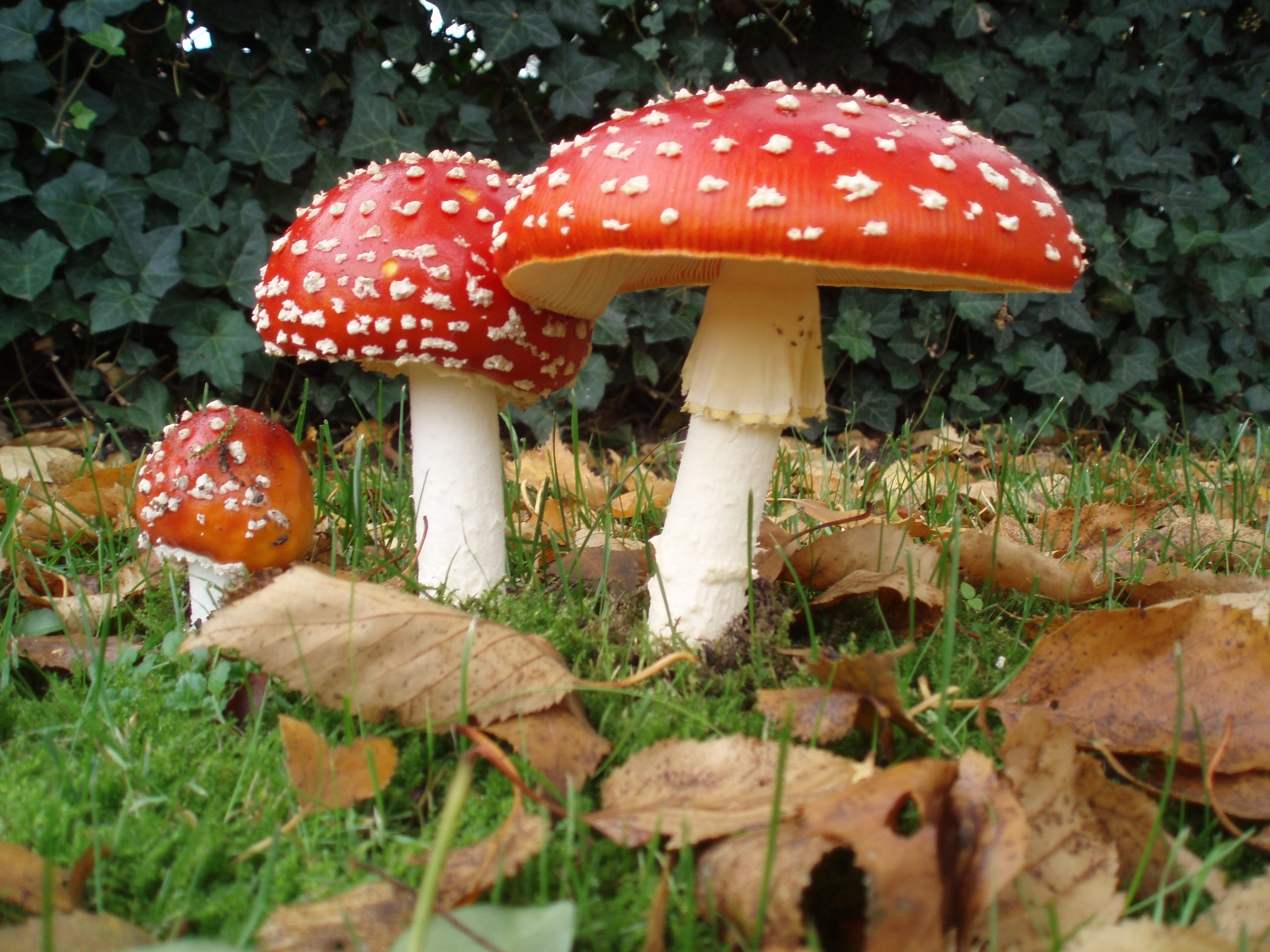
- Amanita muscaria

Scientific classification
- Kingdom: Fungi
- Division: Basidiomycota
- Class: Agaricomycetes
- Order: Agaricales
- Family: Amanitaceae
- Subfamily: Amanitoideae; Gäumann (1926)

= Amanitoideae =

Subfamily of fungi

Amanitoideae is a subfamily of the fungi or mushroom family Amanitaceae. The name was first used as Agaricaceae subfamily Amanitoideae before the subfamily was raised in rank to become the Amanitaceae separated from the revised Agaricaceae.
