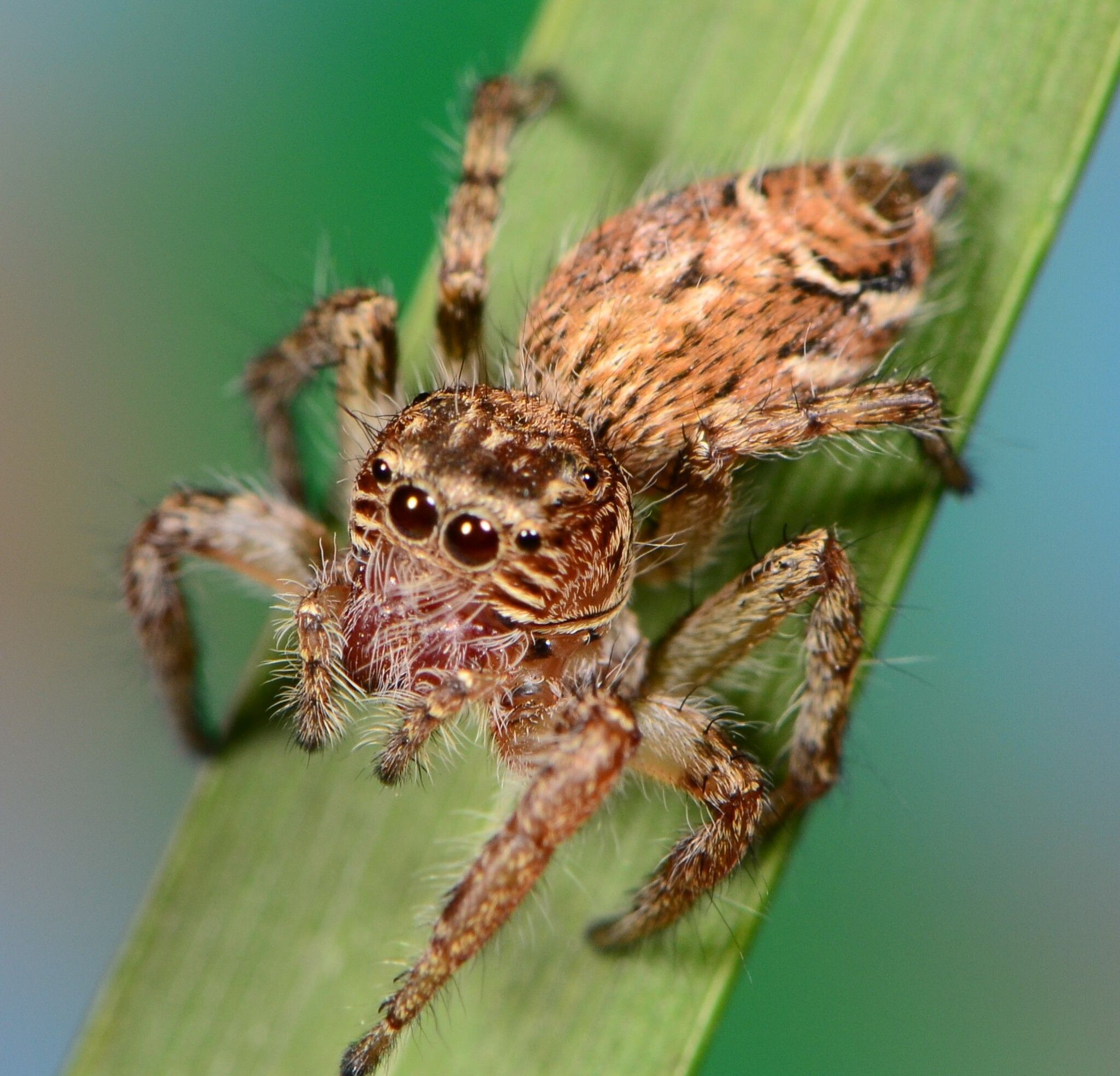
- female
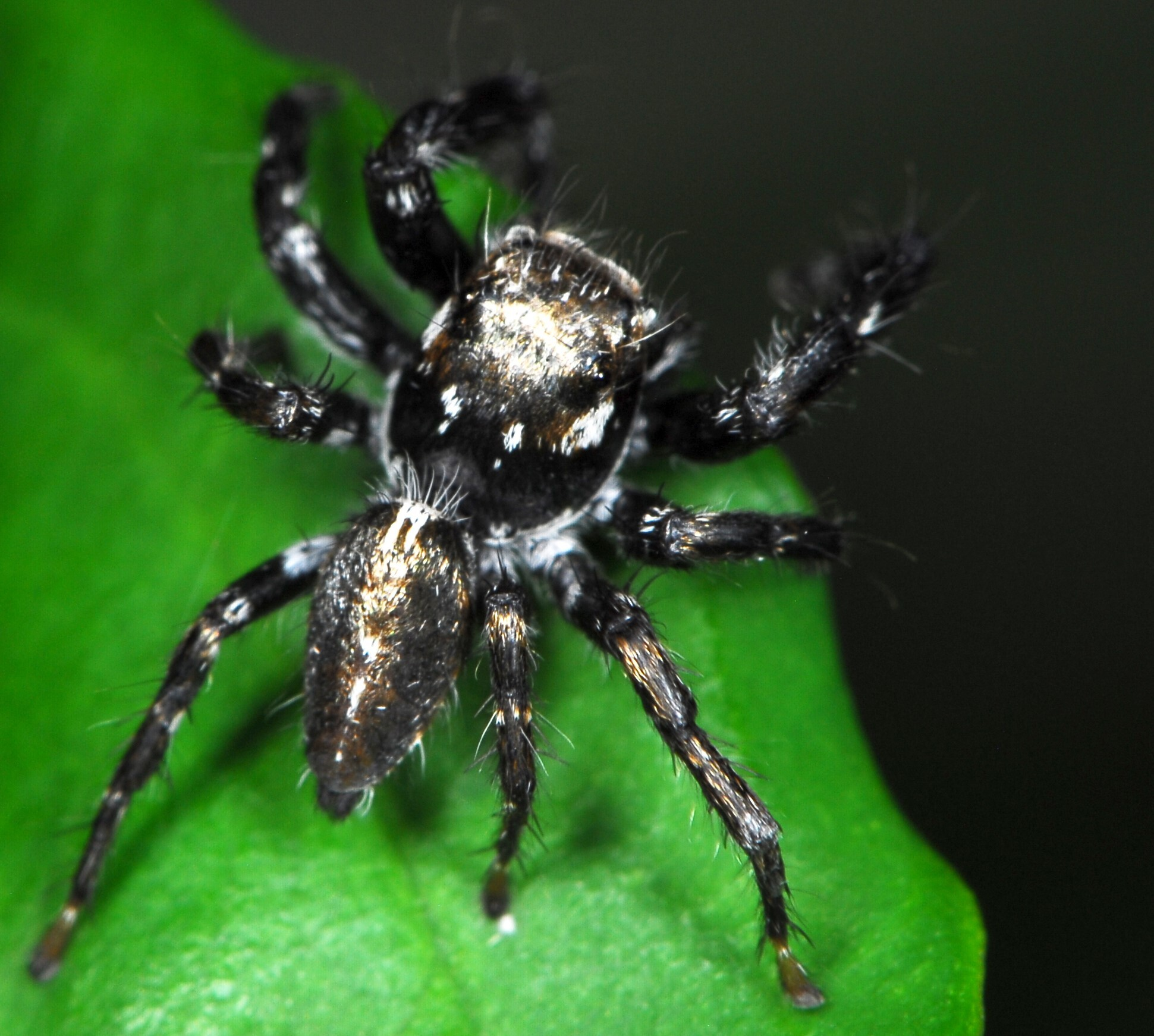
- male

Scientific classification
- Kingdom: Animalia
- Phylum: Arthropoda
- Subphylum: Chelicerata
- Class: Arachnida
- Order: Araneae
- Infraorder: Araneomorphae
- Family: Salticidae
- Genus: Hyllus
- Species: H. dotatus

Binomial name
- Hyllus dotatus (Peckham & Peckham, 1903)

Synonyms
- Habrocestum dotatum Peckham & Peckham, 1903; Hyllus ventrilineatus Strand, 1906; Thyene damarensis Lawrence, 1927; Hyllus dotatum Clark, 1974; Evarcha cara Wesołowska & van Harten, 1994; Hyllus corniger Wesołowska & van Harten, 1994; Evarcha dotata Wesołowska & Russell-Smith, 2000; Evarcha elegans Wesołowska & Russell-Smith, 2000; Evarcha werneri Dippenaar-Schoeman et al., 2025

= Hyllus dotatus =

Dotatus Hyllus Jumping Spider

Species of spider

Hyllus dotatus is a species of spider in the family Salticidae. It is found from South Africa to Yemen and is commonly known as the dotatus Hyllus jumping spider.

== Distribution ==
Hyllus dotatus has been found in Botswana, DR Congo, Ethiopia, Ivory Coast, Ghana, Kenya, Mozambique, Namibia, South Africa, Sudan, Tanzania, Uganda, Yemen, Zambia and Zimbabwe.

In South Africa, the species is known from all nine provinces.

== Habitat and ecology ==
This species is a free-living plant-dweller found on the foliage of shrubs and trees in various savannah and floodplain habitats.

In South Africa, it has been sampled from multiple biomes including Fynbos, Forest, Grassland, Indian Ocean Coastal Belt, Savanna and Thicket at altitudes ranging from 1 to 1732 m. The species has also been sampled from agricultural ecosystems such as cotton, kenaf and maize.

== Description ==
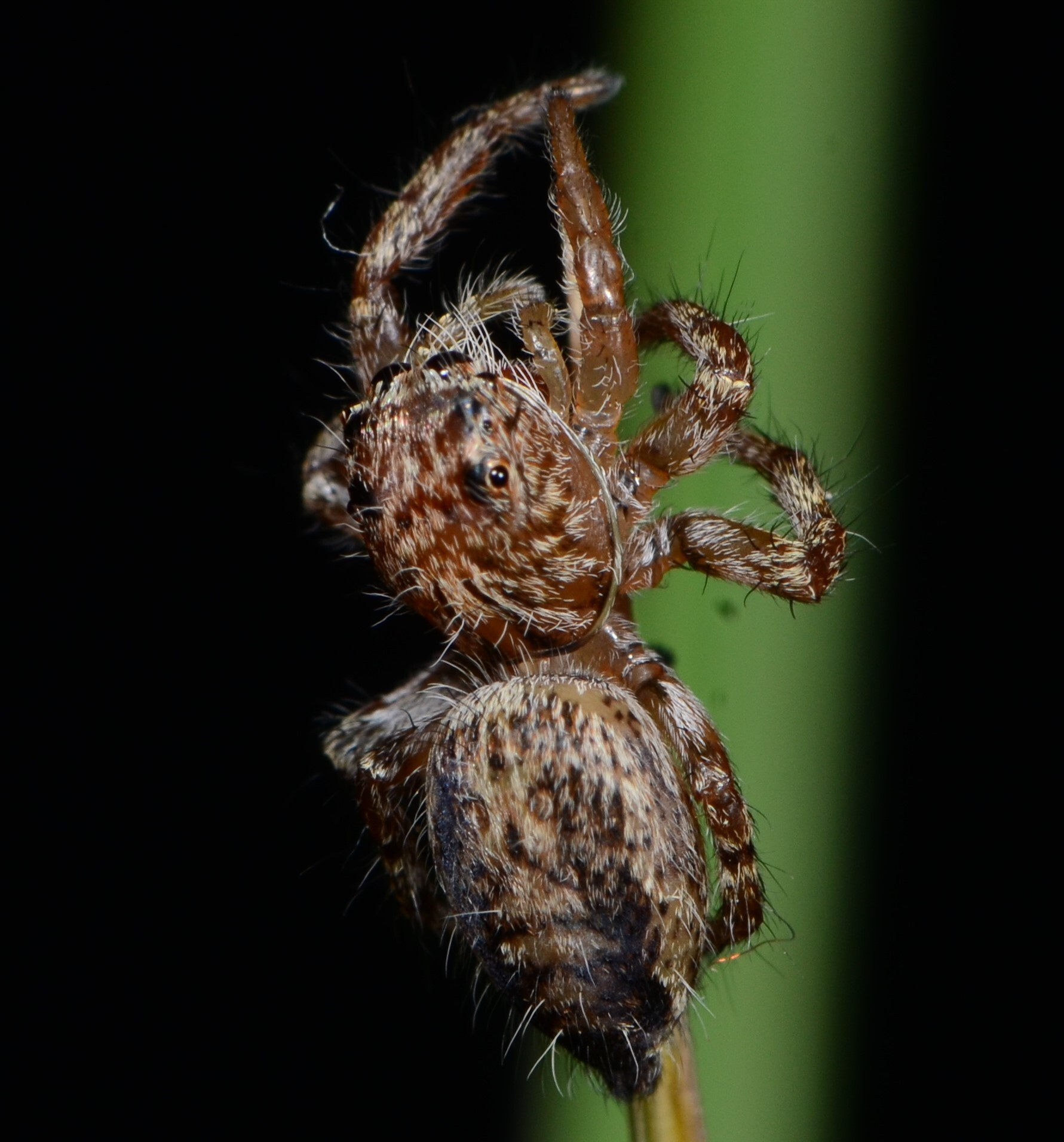
female

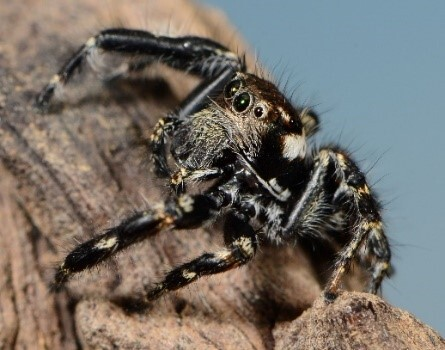
male

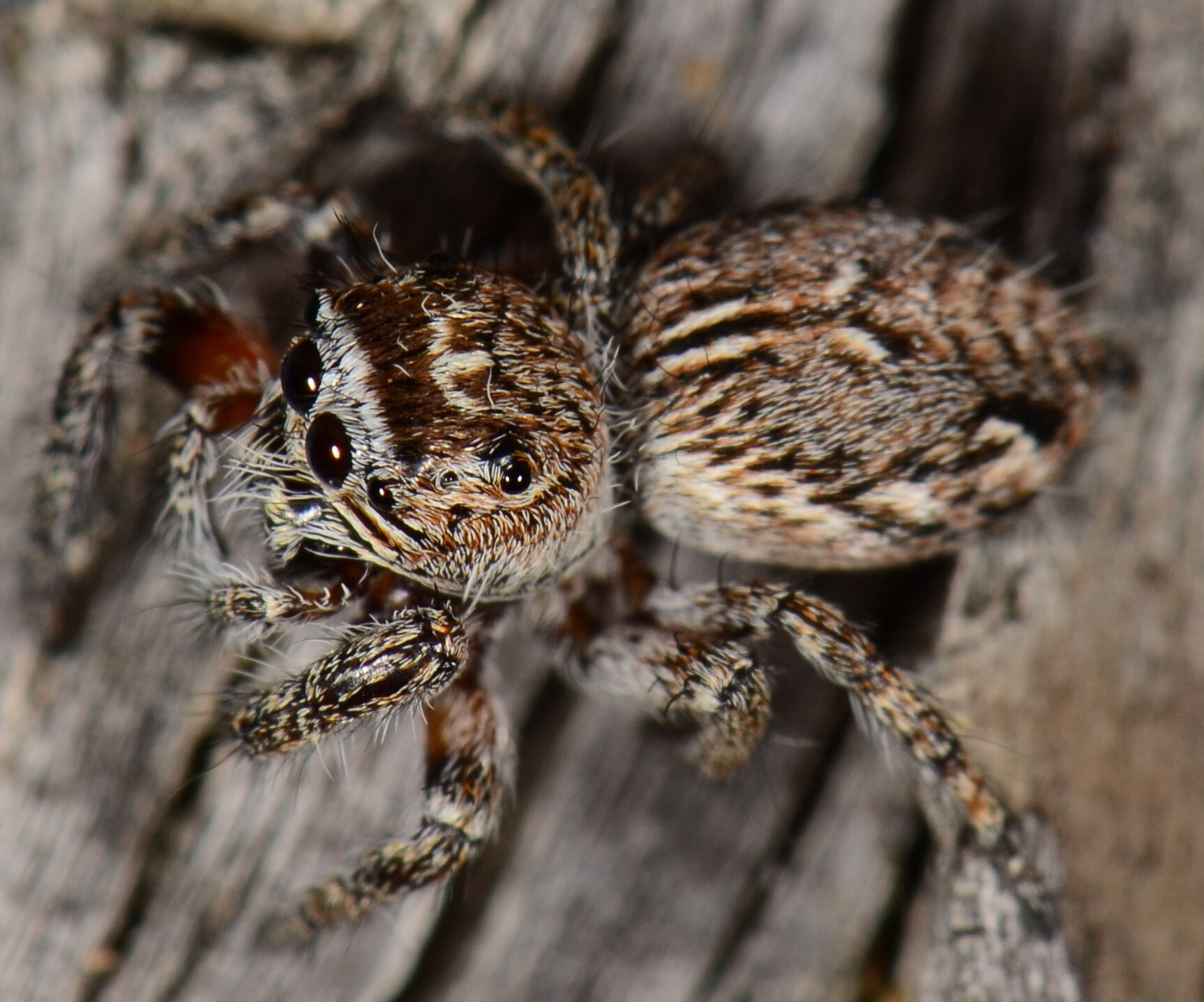
juvenile female

== Conservation ==
Hyllus dotatus is listed as Least Concern due to its wide geographical range across South Africa. It is protected in more than ten protected areas.

== Taxonomy ==
Hyllus dotatus was originally described in 1903 as Habrocestum dotatum from Mashonaland, Zimbabwe. The species has a complex taxonomic history with several synonyms. Both sexes were described by Wesołowska and Russell-Smith in 2000.
