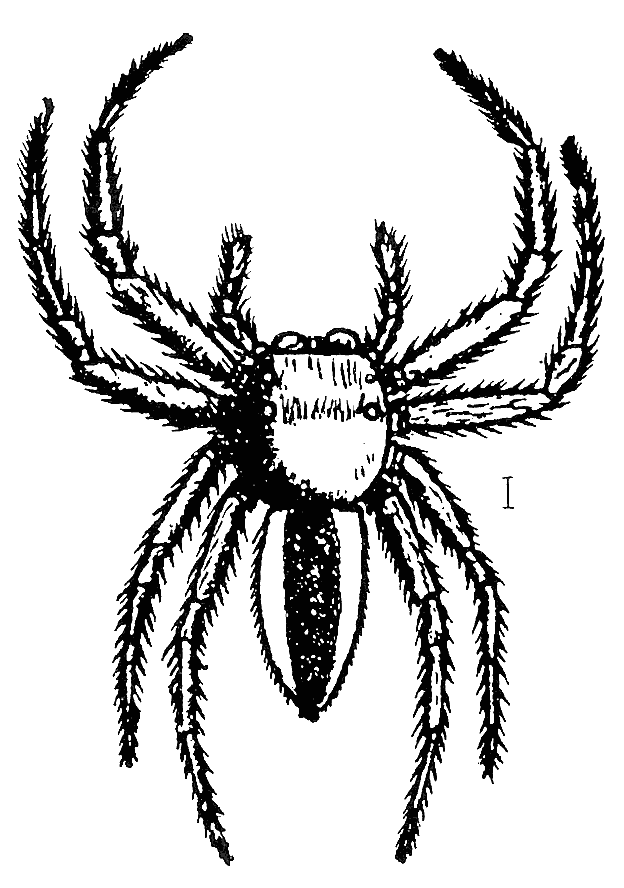
- The related male Phintella versicolor

Scientific classification
- Kingdom: Animalia
- Phylum: Arthropoda
- Subphylum: Chelicerata
- Class: Arachnida
- Order: Araneae
- Infraorder: Araneomorphae
- Family: Salticidae
- Genus: Phintella
- Species: P. globosa

Binomial name
- Phintella globosa Wesołowska & Russell-Smith, 2022

= Phintella globosa =

Species of spider

Phintella globosa is a species of jumping spider in the genus Phintella that lives in Ivory Coast. First described by Wanda Wesołowska and Anthony Russell-Smith in 2022, the spider is small, with a cephalothorax typically 2.1 mm (0.083 in) long and an abdomen 2.0 mm (0.079 in) long. Only the female has been described. The carapace is dark brown and the abdomen yellow. Although similar to the related Phintella lucida, the copulatory organs are distinctive. The spermathecae are particularly large and spherical, which is recalled in the species name.

== Taxonomy ==
Phintella globosa was first described in 2022 by Wanda Wesołowska and Anthony Russell-Smith. The species is one of more than 500 described by Wesołowska. It was allocated to the genus Phintella, raised in 1906 by Embrik Strand and W. Bösenberg. The genus name derives from the genus Phintia, which it resembles. The species name is the Latin for spherical, and relates to the shape of the spermathecae. The genus Phintia was itself renamed Phintodes, which was subsequently absorbed into Tylogonus. There are similarities between spiders within genus Phintella and those in Chira, Chrysilla, Euophrys, Icius, Jotus and Telamonia. Genetic analysis confirms that it is related to the genera Helvetia and Menemerus and is classified in the tribe Chrysillini, named after the genus Chrysilla. In 2017, Jerzy Prószyński grouped the genus with 32 other genera of jumping spiders under the name Chrysillines in the supergroup Chrysilloida.

== Description ==
Phintella globosa is a small spider. The female has a cephalothorax that typically has a length of 2.1 mm (0.083 in) and a width of 1.6 mm (0.063 in). It has a dark brown sloping carapace marked by a wide belt of white hairs towards the back and a black eye field. The clypeus is low and dark with white hairs under the forward eyes. The Chelicerae are long and brown, with two small teeth and the front and one at the back. The remainder of the mouthparts are lighter. The abdomen is typically 2.0 mm (0.079 in) long and 15 mm (0.59 in) wide. It is a yellow oval with a grey swirly pattern. The underside is yellow with a wide grey stripe. The spinnerets are yellow. The legs are also yellow, with brown hairs and spines. The rearmost legs and the longest. The copulatory openings are hidden underneath a layer of sclerite. The seminal ducts are thin leading to spherical spermathecae. Superficially, the copulatory organs are similar to the related Phintella lucida but the seminal ducts are thinner and the spermathecae are much larger. The male has not been described.

== Distribution ==
Phintella globosa is endemic to Ivory Coast. The female holotype was found in Cavally Forest in 1975.
