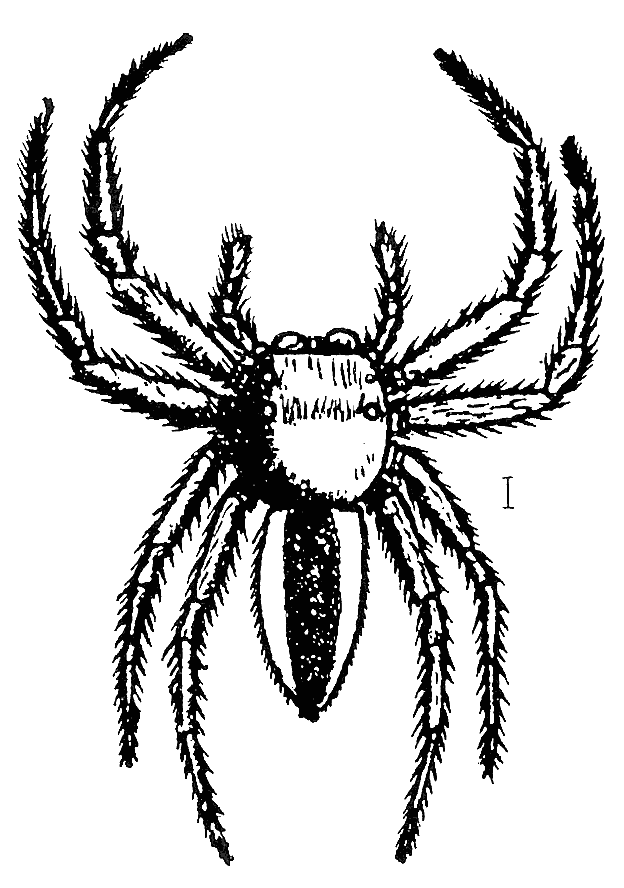
- The related male Phintella versicolor

Scientific classification
- Kingdom: Animalia
- Phylum: Arthropoda
- Subphylum: Chelicerata
- Class: Arachnida
- Order: Araneae
- Infraorder: Araneomorphae
- Family: Salticidae
- Genus: Phintella
- Species: P. transversa

Binomial name
- Phintella transversa Wesołowska & Russell-Smith, 2022

= Phintella transversa =

Species of spider

Phintella transversa is a species of jumping spider in the genus Phintella that lives in Ivory Coast. First described by Wanda Wesołowska and Anthony Russell-Smith in 2022, only the male has been identified. The spider is small, with a cephalothorax between 2.0 and 2.4 mm (0.079 and 0.094 in) long and an abdomen that is between 2.1 and 2.4 mm (0.083 and 0.094 in) long. The carapace is dark brown and the abdomen is brownish-black and marked with four light, nearly white streaks. It is that abdominal pattern that most clearly distinguishes the species from others in the genus and is recalled in the species name. The copulatory organs are also distinctive. The palpal bulb has a small triangular lobe on the back and a curved addition near the small embolus.

== Taxonomy ==
Phintella transversa is a jumping spider that was first described by Wanda Wesołowska and Anthony Russell-Smith in 2022. The species is one of more than 500 described by Wesołowska during her career. It was allocated to the genus Phintella, first raised in 1906 by Embrik Strand and W. Bösenberg. The genus name derives from the genus Phintia, which it resembles. The genus Phintia was itself renamed Phintodes, which was subsequently absorbed into Tylogonus. There are similarities between spiders within genus Phintella and those in Chira, Chrysilla, Euophrys, Icius, Jotus and Telamonia. Genetic analysis confirms that it is related to the genera Helvetia and Menemerus and is classified in the tribe Chrysillini, named after the genus Chrysilla. In 2017, Jerzy Prószyński grouped the genus with 32 other genera of jumping spiders under the name Chrysillines in the supergroup Chrysilloida. The species is named after a Latin word that describes the pattern on the spider's abdomen.

== Description ==
Phintella transversa is a small spider. The male has a cephalothorax that typically has a length of between 2.0 and 2.4 mm (0.079 and 0.094 in) and a width of between 1.5 and 1.8 mm (0.059 and 0.071 in). It has a dark brown carapace with a darker eye field. There are white stripes on the side. The chelicerae are long and brown with two teeth the front and one to the back. The ovoid abdomen is between 2.1 and 2.4 mm (0.083 and 0.094 in) long and between 1.2 and 1.4 mm (0.047 and 0.055 in) wide. It is brownish-black with a pattern of four light, nearly white streaks across the top. The underside is brownish grey. The spinnerets are yellow and the legs are dark brown and brown, with brown hairs and spines. The pedipalps has a scattering of white hairs. The palpal bulb has a small triangular lobe on the back, a small curved appendix at top near the small embolus and a short sharp appendage, or apophysis, on the tibia. Only the male has been described.

The species can be identified by the pattern on the abdomen which differs from other spiders in the genus, like Phintella versicolor. Superficially, the species is similar to the related Phintella brevis but the shape of the copulatory organs can also help tell the two the species apart.

== Distribution ==
Phintella transversa is endemic to Ivory Coast. The male holotype was found in Lamto in Bandama Forest in 1975.
