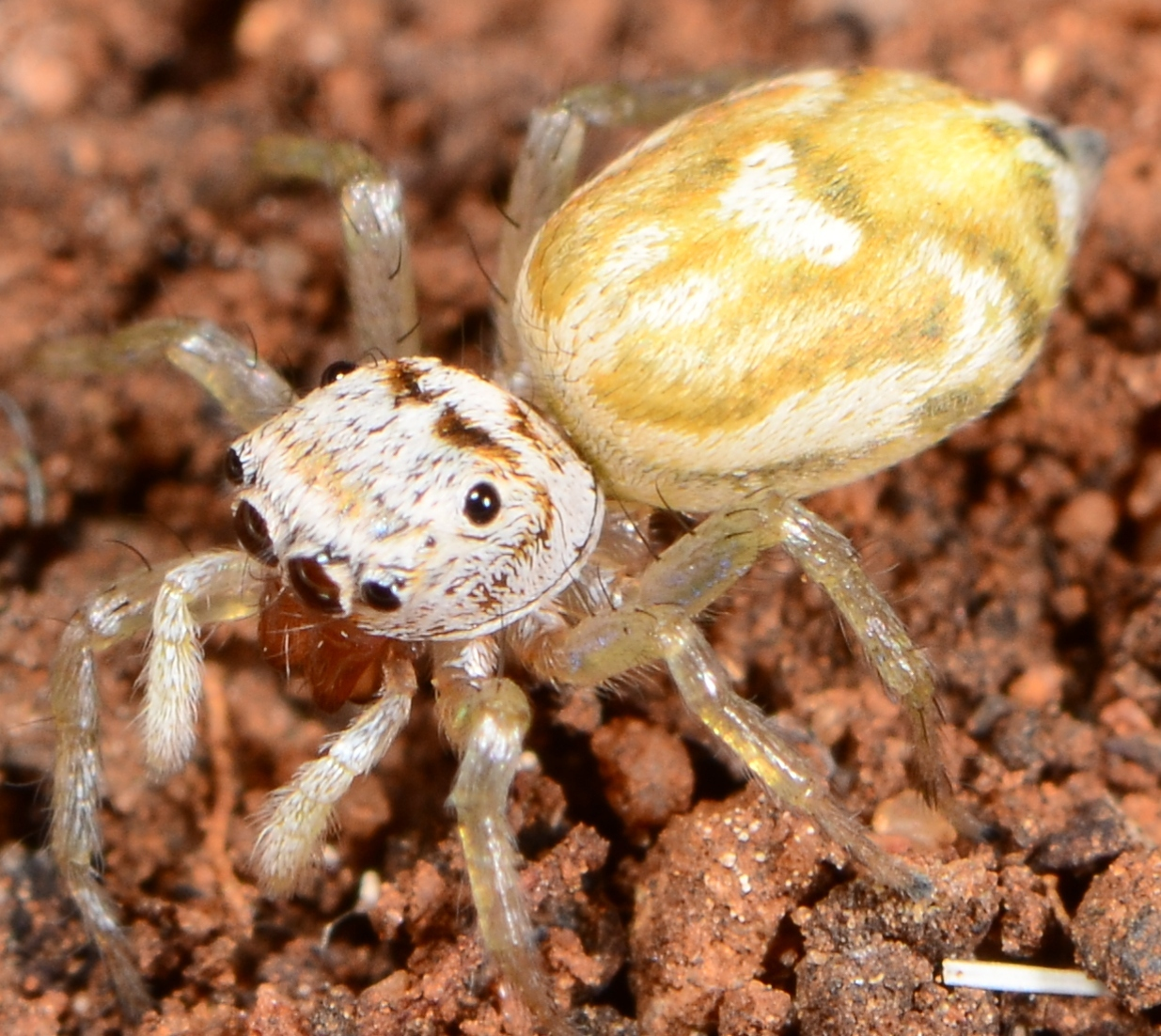
- female
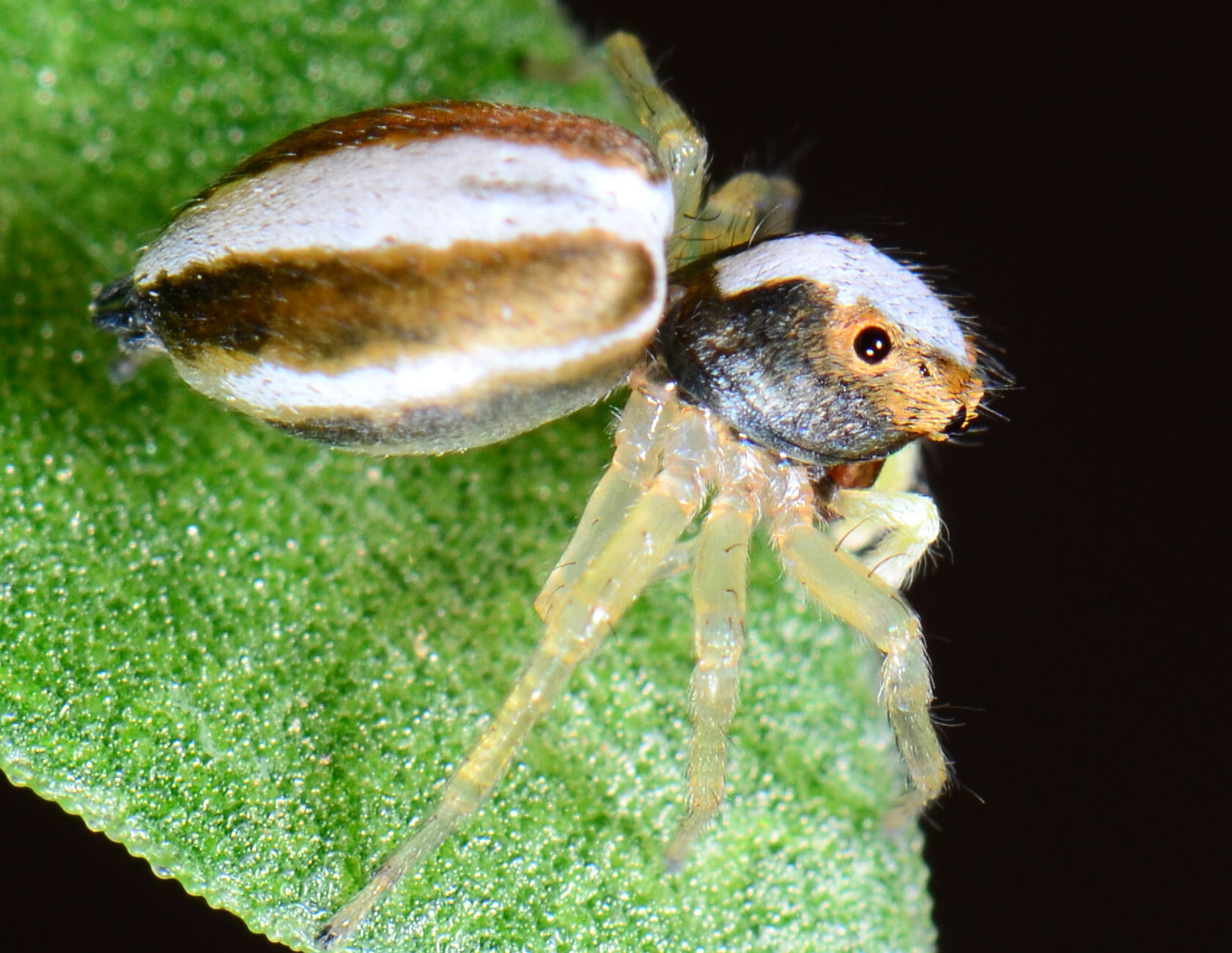
- female

Scientific classification
- Kingdom: Animalia
- Phylum: Arthropoda
- Subphylum: Chelicerata
- Class: Arachnida
- Order: Araneae
- Infraorder: Araneomorphae
- Family: Salticidae
- Genus: Phintella
- Species: P. lajuma

Binomial name
- Phintella lajuma Haddad & Wesołowska, 2013

= Phintella lajuma =

Species of spider

Phintella lajuma is a species of jumping spider in the genus Phintella that lives in South Africa. It was first described in 2013 by Charles Haddad and Wanda Wesołowska, and given a name to reflect the fact that it was first found in the forests around Lajuma Mountain in Soutpansberg. Only the female has so far been described. The spider is medium-sized and lighter in colour than its relative Phintella lucida. It has a light brown carapace and yellow beige abdomen that has a pattern of linesand patches. The epigyne is distinctively large and has a plate at the rear.

== Taxonomy ==
Phintella lajuma is a species of jumping spider, a member of the family Salticidae, that was first identified in 2013 by Charles Haddad and Wanda Wesołowska, one of over 500 species described by the Polish arachnologist. The spider's specific name is derived from the name of the mountain where it was first found. The genus Phintella was raised in 1906 by Embrik Strand and W. Bösenberg. The genus name derives from the genus Phintia, which it resembles. The genus Phintia was itself renamed Phintodes, which was subsequently absorbed into Tylogonus. There are similarities between spiders within genus Phintella and those in Chira, Chrysilla, Euophrys, Icius, Jotus and Telamonia. Genetic analysis confirms that it is related to the genera Helvetia and Menemerus and is classified in the tribe Chrysillini.

== Description ==
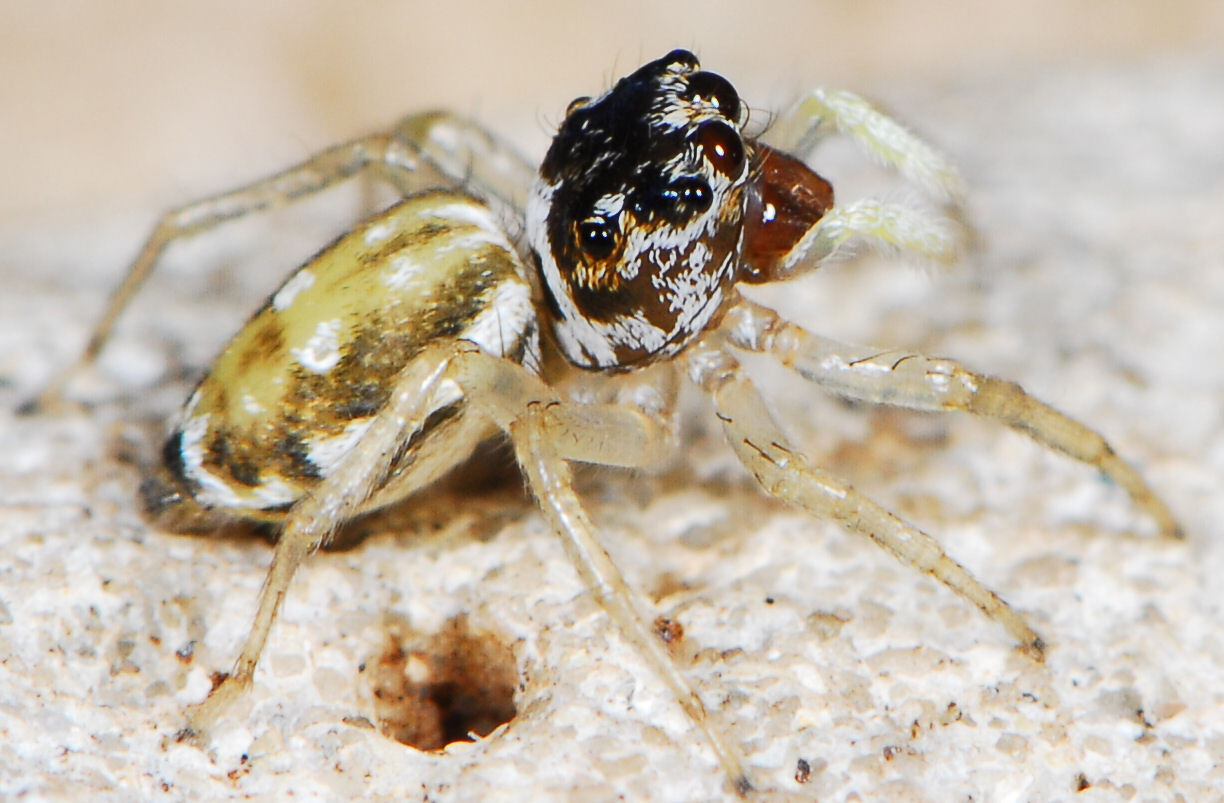
female

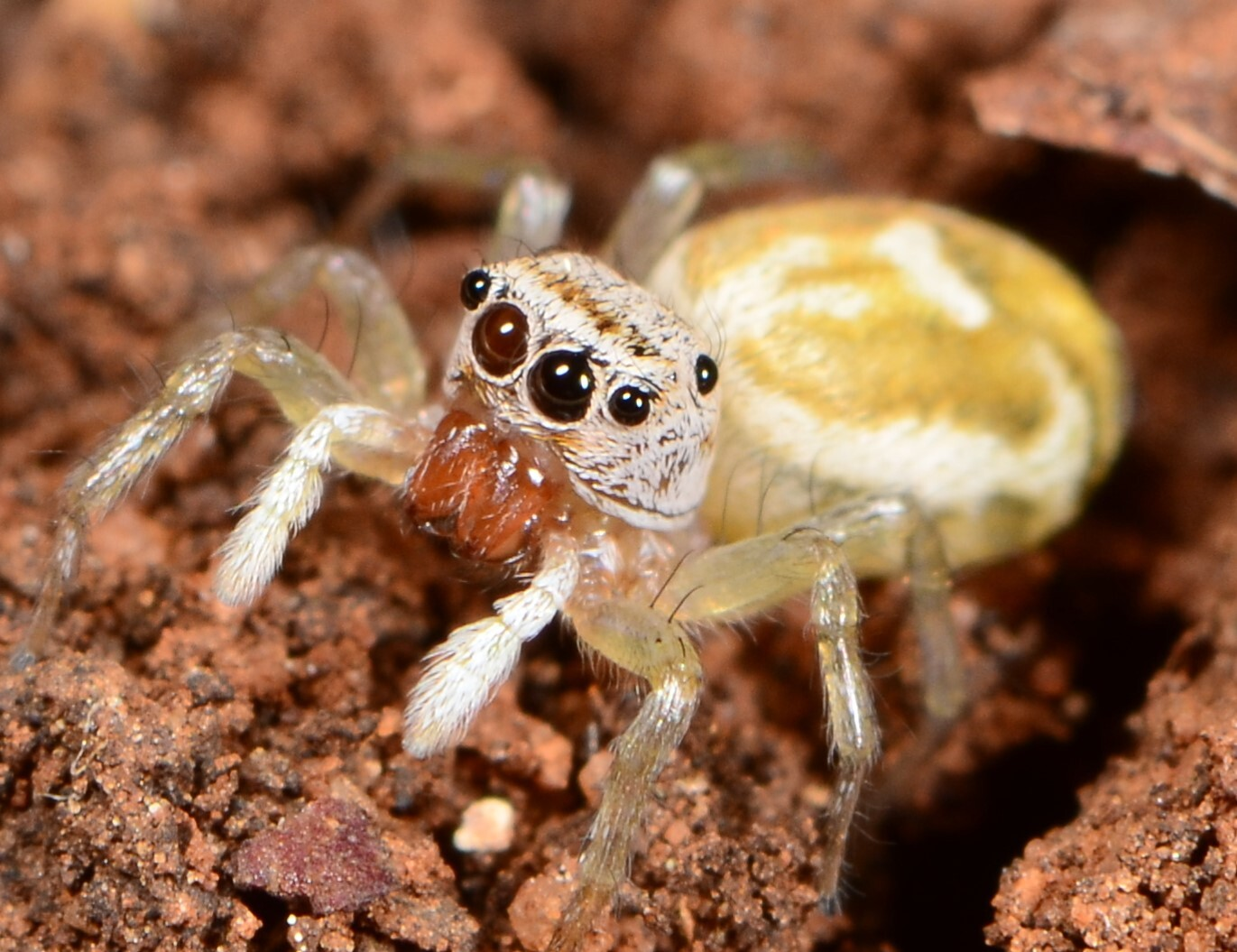
female

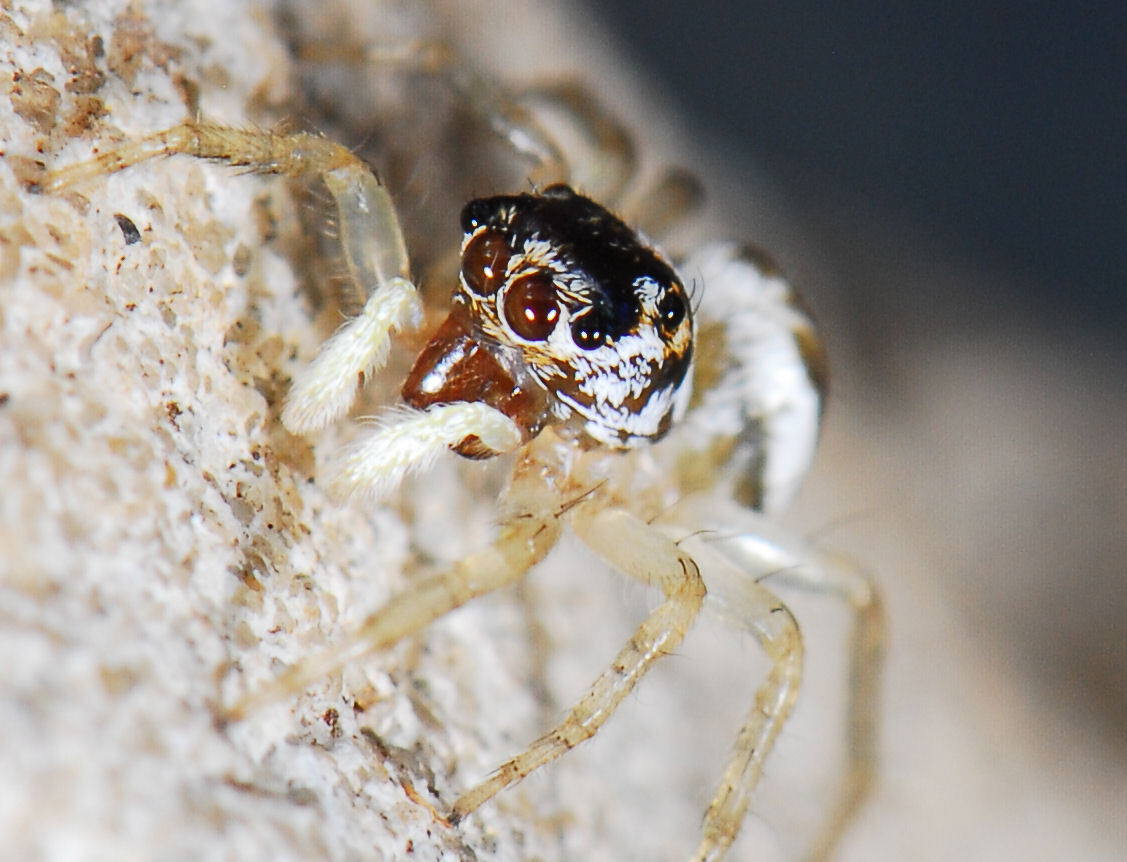
juvenile female

Only the female of the species has so far been identified. The spider is medium-sized, with shape that is typical of the genus, particularly the shape of its epigyne, which resembles Phintella lucida. However, the spider is distinctive in colour, as the other species is a darker brown. The light brown carapace is oval, elongated, covered in short hairs. The clypeus is also light, while the oval abdomen is yellow beige with a pattern of darker lines and patches. The spinnerets are also yellow. The abdomen is 3.1 mm (0.12 in) long and 2.4 mm (0.094 in) wide while the cephalothorax is 2.1 mm (0.083 in) in length and 1.7 mm (0.067 in) across.The female has a distinctive large epigyne, with a large sclerotized plate at the rear of the spider.

== Distribution ==
Phintella lajuma has only been found in the Lajuma Mountain Retreat in the Soutpansberg Mountains of the Limpopo Province in South Africa.
