= Phintellosa =

Scientific classification
- Kingdom: Animalia
- Phylum: Arthropoda
- Subphylum: Chelicerata
- Class: Arachnida
- Order: Araneae
- Infraorder: Araneomorphae
- Family: Salticidae
- Genus: Phintellosa; Wiśniewski & Wesołowska, 2024
- Species: P. comosissima

Binomial name
- Phintellosa comosissima (Simon, 1886)

Species of spider

Phintellosa is a monotypic genus of spiders in the family Salticidae containing the single species, Phintellosa comosissima.

== Distribution ==
Phintellosa comosissima has been recorded from Guinea, Uganda, and Angola.

== Etymology ==
The genus name refers to related genus Phintella.
