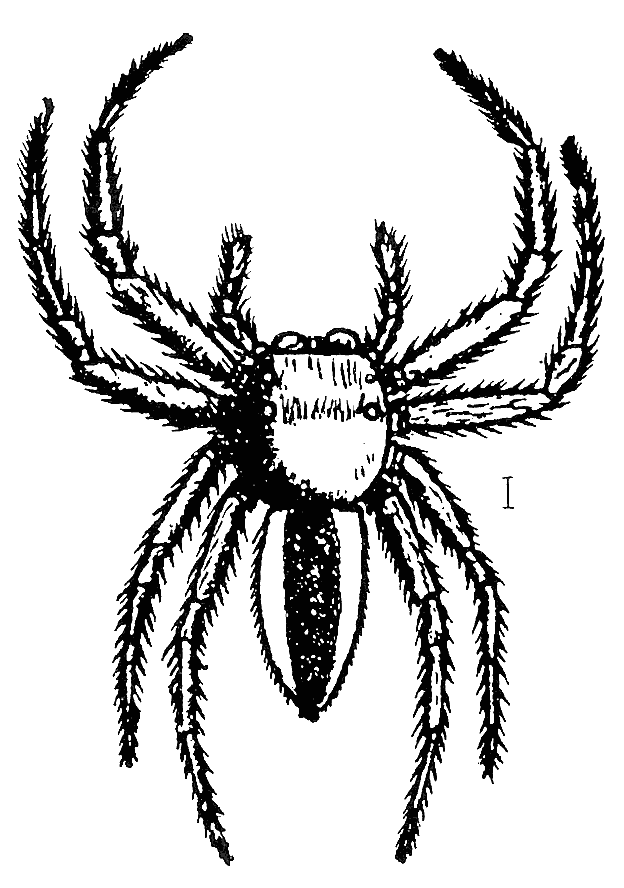
- The related male Phintella versicolor

Scientific classification
- Kingdom: Animalia
- Phylum: Arthropoda
- Subphylum: Chelicerata
- Class: Arachnida
- Order: Araneae
- Infraorder: Araneomorphae
- Family: Salticidae
- Genus: Phintella
- Species: P. incerta

Binomial name
- Phintella incerta Wesołowska & Russell-Smith, 2000

= Phintella incerta =

Species of spider

Phintella incerta is a species of jumping spider in the genus Phintella that lives in the Mkomazi Game Reserve in Tanzania. The female of the species was first described in 2000 by Wanda Wesołowska and Anthony Russel-Smith. The spider, is small with a light brown carapace that is typically 1.3 mm (0.051 in) long and a greyish-beige abdomen, typically 1.6 mm (0.063 in) in length. The abdomen has a pattern of three stripes. The female has a distinctive sclerotized epigyne that helps distinguish the spider from other members of the genus. The male has not been identified.

== Taxonomy ==
Phintella incerta is a jumping spider that was first identified in 2008 by Wanda Wesołowska and Anthony Russel-Smith. The spider was named after the Latin word for uncertain. It is one of over 500 species identified by Wesołowska. It was allocated to the genus Phintella, raised in 1906 by Embrik Strand and W. Bösenberg. The genus name derives from the genus Phintia, which it resembles. The genus Phintia was itself renamed Phintodes, which was subsequently absorbed into Tylogonus. There are similarities between spiders within genus Phintella and those in Chira, Chrysilla, Euophrys, Icius, Jotus and Telamonia. Genetic analysis confirms that it is related to the genera Helvetia and Menemerus and is classified in the tribe Chrysillini.

== Description ==
The spider was described based on a specimen found as part of a survey of invertebrates that was undertaken between November 1994 and January 1995. Only the female has so far been described. The species differs from other members of the genus by the design of the epigyne, which is oval with pronounced sclerite. It has copulatory openings that lead to relatively short seminal ducts and oval receptacles.

Phintella incerta is a small spider with an oval low light brown carapace that is typically 1.3 mm (0.051 in) in length and 0.9 mm (0.035 in) in width. It has a black eye field which has a scattering of grey hairs and brown bristles around the eyes. The clypeus is similarly brown, as is the sternum. The chelicerae are brown with two teeth at the front and a one to the back. It has a brown maxilla. The abdomen is elongated and greyish-beige with three brown stripes running down it. It is larger than the carapace, typically 1.6 mm (0.063 in) long and 0.8 mm (0.031 in) wide. The underside of the abdomen is light with a pattern of brown dots forming two streaks. The spinnerets and the legs are yellowish, although the legs have brown hairs and spines.

== Distribution and habitat ==
Phintella incerta is endemic to Tanzania. The spider has been found in the Mkomazi Game Reserve, in grass tussocks near a pool. The holotype was found in 1996. It has not been found in other areas of the country.
