= Phintella africana =

Scientific classification
- Kingdom: Animalia
- Phylum: Arthropoda
- Subphylum: Chelicerata
- Class: Arachnida
- Order: Araneae
- Infraorder: Araneomorphae
- Family: Salticidae
- Genus: Phintella
- Species: P. africana

Binomial name
- Phintella africana Wesołowska & Tomasiewicz, 2008

Species of jumping spider

Phintella africana is a species of jumping spider that lives in the grasslands of Ethiopia. A member of the genus Phintella, the species is named after Africa, the continent on which it was first found. Only the female has been described. It is a small spider that is typically typically 1.8 mm (0.07 in) long. It has a brown forward part of its body, or cephalothorax, and, behind that, an abdomen that has a mottled yellow and brown pattern on top and is lighter yellow underneath. It has generally yellow legs. Phintella africana was first described in 2008 and is distinguished from others in the genus by the way that the spider's copulatory openings are at the back of her epigyne, the external visible part of the spider's copulatory organs.

== Taxonomy and etymology ==
Phintella africana is a jumping spider that was first described by the arachnologists Wanda Wesołowska and Beata Tomasiewicz in 2008. It is one of over 500 species identified by Wesołowska during her career. The specific name is derived from the name of the continent where it first found.

They allocated the spider to the genus Phintella, first circumscribed in 1906 by Embrik Strand and W. Bösenberg. The genus name derives from the genus Phintia, which it resembles. The genus Phintia was itself renamed Phintodes, which was subsequently absorbed into Tylogonus. There are similarities between spiders within genus Phintella and those in Chira, Chrysilla, Euophrys, Icius, Jotus and Telamonia.

Genetic analysis confirms that it is related to the genera Helvetia and Menemerus. It is a member of the tribe Heliophaninae, renamed Chrysillini by Wayne Maddison in 2015. Chrysillines are monophyletic. The tribe is ubiquitous across most of the continents of the world. It is allocated to the subclade Saltafresia in the clade Salticoida. n 2017, Jerzy Prószyński grouped the genus with 32 other genera of jumping spiders under the name Chrysillines in the supergroup Chrysilloida.

== Description ==
The spider was described based on a specimen found by Anthony Russell-Smith between 1982 and 1988.

Its cephalothorax measures typically 1.5 mm (0.06 in) in length and 1.3 mm (0.05 in) in width. The spider's carapace, the hard top section of its cephalothorax, is rather high with a steep slope to the rear. It is brown and covered with colourless hairs. There are brown bristles near its eyes, which are surrounded by black rings. The underside of its cephalothorax, known as its sternum, is rounded and brown. The part of the spider's face known as its clypeus is low and brown and its mouthparts, including its chelicerae, labium and maxillae, are brownish. It has a single visible tooth.

The spider's abdomen is an oval in shape and typically 2.4 mm (0.09 in) long and 1.8 mm (0.07 in). The top of its abdomen has a mottled pattern of brown patches on a yellow background. The bottom of the abdomen is light yellow. It also has lightly-coloured spinnerets. The spider's legs are light brown and have a scattering of brown hairs and a small number of spines.

The species is similar to other members of the genus but differs in the design of its copulatory organs. The female has a rounded epigyne, the external visible part of its copulatory organs, which has a large pocket in the middle. It has two copulatory openings near the back, which is characteristic of the species. These lead via thick-walled insemination ducts to spherical spermathecae, or receptacles, along with small accessory glands. The interior of the spider's copulatory organs show signs of sclerotization. The male has not been described.

== Distribution and habitat ==
Phintella africana is endemic to Ethiopia. It has been found in the Sidamo Province living in grasslands.
