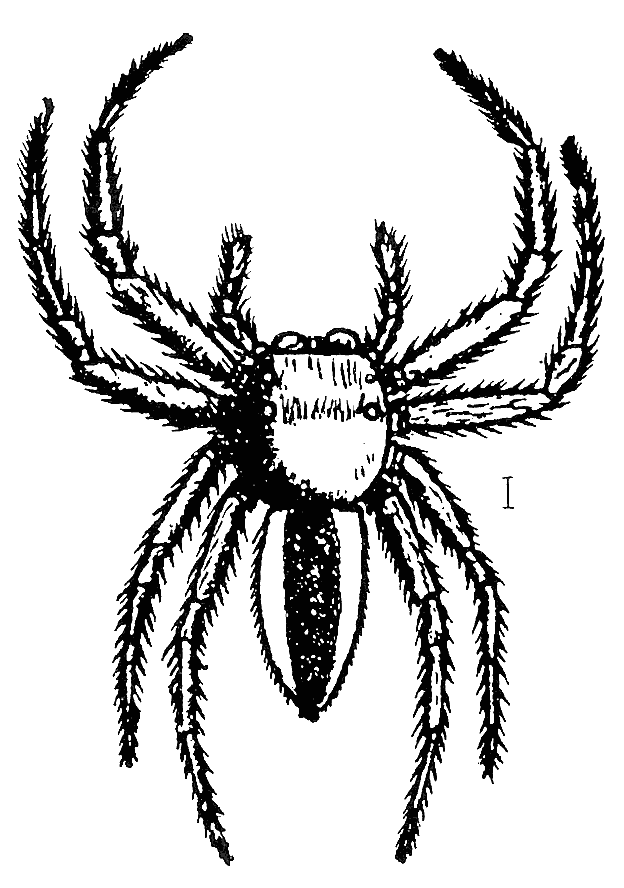
- The related male Phintella versicolor

Scientific classification
- Kingdom: Animalia
- Phylum: Arthropoda
- Subphylum: Chelicerata
- Class: Arachnida
- Order: Araneae
- Infraorder: Araneomorphae
- Family: Salticidae
- Genus: Phintella
- Species: P. occidentalis

Binomial name
- Phintella occidentalis Wesołowska & Russell-Smith, 2022

= Phintella occidentalis =

Species of spider

Phintella occidentalis is a species of jumping spider in the subfamily Salticinae that lives in Ivory Coast. First described by Wanda Wesołowska and Anthony Russell-Smith in 2022, the species is named after the Latin word for western as it is found in West Africa. The spider is small, with a cephalothorax between 2.3 and 2.8 mm (0.091 and 0.110 in) long and an abdomen that is between 3.1 and 3.5 mm (0.12 and 0.14 in) long. The female is smaller than the male. The carapace is brown, the female light and the male dark. The abdomen is yellow and is marked by two wide brown stripes on the female and a grey streak on the male. It is the abdominal pattern that most clearly distinguishes the species from others in the genus. The copulatory organs are also different. The male has a longer tibial apophysis, or appendage and the female has seminal ducts that diverge and then converge.

== Taxonomy ==
Phintella occidentalis was first described in 2022 by Wanda Wesołowska and Anthony Russell-Smith. The species is one of more than 500 described by Wesołowska. The species name is the Latin for western and relates to the fact that it comes from West Africa. It was allocated to the genus Phintella, raised in 1906 by Embrik Strand and W. Bösenberg. The genus name derives from the genus Phintia, which it resembles. The genus Phintia was itself renamed Phintodes, which was subsequently absorbed into Tylogonus. There are similarities between spiders within genus Phintella and those in Chira, Chrysilla, Euophrys, Icius, Jotus and Telamonia. Genetic analysis confirms that it is related to the genera Helvetia and Menemerus and is classified in the tribe Chrysillini, named after the genus Chrysilla. In 2017, Jerzy Prószyński grouped the genus with 32 other genera of jumping spiders under the name Chrysillines in the supergroup Chrysilloida.

== Description ==
Phintella occidentalis is a small spider. The female has a cephalothorax that typically has a length of 2.3 mm (0.091 in) and a width of 2 mm (0.079 in). It has a light brown carapace with a darker eye field. There are white hairs on the side and the clypeus. The abdomen is typically 3.1 mm (0.12 in) long and 2 mm (0.079 in) wide. It is yellow with a pattern of two wide brown stripes down the middle on the top and additional stripes on the sides. The spinnerets are yellow and the chelicerae are yellow-brown. The legs are also yellow, with brown hairs and spines. The epigyne is small and has seminal ducts that initially diverge before converging on large spherical spermathecae.

The male is longer than the female. It has a cephalothorax that is typically 2.8 mm (0.11 in) long and 2.2 mm (0.087 in) wide and an abdomen that is 3.5 mm (0.14 in) long and 1.7 mm (0.067 in) wide. The carapace is dark brown with a lighter area near the eye field. The eyes have fawn hairs around them. The chelicerae are unidentate, with small teeth, and light brown. The abdomen is hairy and yellow, apart from a grey streak down the middle on the top and four lines of dots on the underside, and has dark lines along the sides. The legs are long and thin. The spinnerets and pedipalps are brown. The palpal bulb has a curved embolus and relatively long appendage, or apophysis, on the tibia.

The species can be identified by the pattern on the abdomen, which is particularly pronounced on the female. Superficially, the copulatory organs are similar to the related Phintella popovi but the length of the tibial apophysis on the male and morphology of the seminal ducts on the female can help tell the two the species apart.

== Distribution ==
Phintella occidentalis is endemic to Ivory Coast. The male holotype and female paratype were both found in Lamto in Bandama Forest in 1975.
