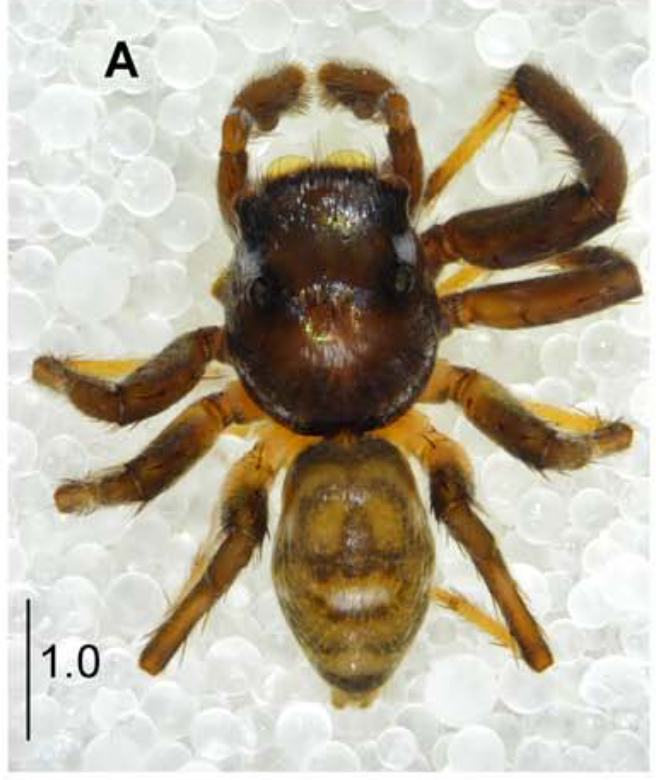
- Mature male from Ivory Coast

Scientific classification
- Kingdom: Animalia
- Phylum: Arthropoda
- Subphylum: Chelicerata
- Class: Arachnida
- Order: Araneae
- Infraorder: Araneomorphae
- Family: Salticidae
- Genus: Phintella
- Species: P. paludosa

Binomial name
- Phintella paludosa Wesołowska & Edwards, 2012

= Phintella paludosa =

Species of jumping spider

Phintella paludosa is a species of jumping spider that lives in Africa. A member of the genus Phintella, it was first described in 2012 by Wanda Wesołowska and G. B. Edwards, from a holotype discovered in Cross River State, Nigeria. It has subsequently also found in Guinea, Ivory Coast, and Mozambique. The species was first seen in a swamp, so the species name is derived from the Latin for "marshy". The spider is small, with a brown carapace, the topside of the front section of its body, and, behind that, an almost black abdomen. The female is smaller than the male, measuring typically 3.2 mm (0.13 in) rather than 4.5 mm (0.18 in) in body length. Its long legs are more yellow. It is similar to the related Phintella aequipes but can be distinguished by its copulatory organs. The female has copulatory openings at the rear of its very small epigyne, the visible external part of its copulatory organs. The male has a thick short embolus.

== Taxonomy and etymology ==
Phintella paludosa is a jumping spider, a member of the family Salticidae, that was first described by the arachnologists Wanda Wesołowska and G. B. Edwards in 2012. It is one of over 500 species identified by Wesołowska during her career. The spider was initially described based on a holotype specimen found by Jonathan Reid between 1978 and 1984. Reid, who was affiliated with the University of Calabar at the time, subsequently deposited it at Florida State Collection of Arthropods while attached to the University of Florida. It is now located at the National Museum of Natural History, France.

The spider's specific name is derived from the Latin word for "marshy", and refers to the marshy ground where it was first discovered. It was placed in the genus Phintella, first raised in 1906 by Embrik Strand and W. Bösenberg. Its generic name derives from the genus Phintia, which it resembles. The genus Phintia was itself renamed Phintodes, which was subsequently absorbed into Tylogonus. There are similarities between spiders within genus Phintella and those in Chira, Chrysilla, Euophrys, Icius, Jotus and Telamonia. Genetic analysis confirms that it is related to the genera Helvetia and Menemerus and is classified in the tribe Chrysillini.

== Description ==
The species is similar to the related Phintella aequipes, which is found throughout Africa, in size and colour but differs in the structure of its copulatory organs. The male has a cephalothorax, the front section of its body, that is typically 2.3 mm (0.091 in) in length, 1.6 mm (0.063 in) in width and 0.9 mm (0.035 in) in height. The top side of its cephalothorax, its carapace, is a brown oval, covered in short brownish hairs. There are dark rings and longer bristles around its eyes. The underside of its cephalothorax, or sternum, is brown. The part of the spider's face known as its clypeus is brownish and features some white scales. Its chelicerae, which act as its jaws, are long and slender. As well as a long fang, they have two teeth along their front and another towards the back. Its remaining mouthparts, its labium and maxillae, are brownish apart from their white tips.

The male has an oval abdomen that is typically 2.2 mm (0.087 in) long and 1.6 mm (0.063 in) wide. On top, it is very dark, almost black, and shiny with a pattern that consists of a white patch towards the middle and three white spots along its edges. The white areas are covered in white scales. Underneath, it is a uniform dark brown. To spin webs, it has spinnerets, the front set yellowish, the back set black. Its legs are long and have sections that are black and yellow. They have brown leg hairs and spines. The male has thick pedipalps. Its copulatory organs consist of a rather flat hairy cymbium that dominates a smaller palpal bulb. The bulb has a small bump near its base and a relatively short embolus emanating from its top.

The female is smaller than the male, with an abdomen and cephalothorax that are each 1.6 mm (0.063 in) long; they are 1.0 mm (0.039 in) and 1.1 mm (0.043 in) respectively. It is hard otherwise to distinguish from the male, being very similar. Its legs are different as they are paler, generally yellow apart from a few dark markings. Its epigyne, the external visible part of its copulatory organs, is very small and shows slight amounts of sclerotization. Its two copulatory openings are found at the very rear of its epigyne. They lead via very thin copulatory ducts to relatively large bean-like spermathecae, or receptacles. These are connected to lengthened fertilisation ducts. A female specimen has a yellow abdomen that has a faint pattern of light symmetrical patches, including three concentric chevrons near the very back of the spider.

== Distribution and habitat ==
Phintella spiders are common across much of Africa. Phintella paludosa was first found in the Cross Rivers State in Nigeria, at the edge of a swamp. In 2022, when Wesołowska and Anthony Russell-Smith were undertaking an assessment of a large collection of spiders brought by Jean-Claude Ledoux from Ivory Coast to France between August 1974 and January 1976, they discovered another example that originated in the Lamto Scientific Reserve in Ivory Coast. The first discovery of the species in southern Africa was recorded in Tete, Mozambique. It has also been seen in the Nimba Mountains in Guinea, at an altitude of 1,100 m (3,600 ft) above sea level. It is now recognised as having a species distribution that includes all four countries. As well as swamps, it lives in forests.
