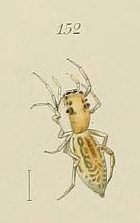
- female

Scientific classification
- Kingdom: Animalia
- Phylum: Arthropoda
- Subphylum: Chelicerata
- Class: Arachnida
- Order: Araneae
- Infraorder: Araneomorphae
- Family: Salticidae
- Genus: Phintella
- Species: P. arenicolor

Binomial name
- Phintella arenicolor (Grube, 1861)

Synonyms
- Attus arenicolor Grube, 1861; Maevia mellotei Simon, 1889; Jotus difficilis Bösenberg & Strand, 1906; Sitticus pallicolor Bösenberg & Strand, 1906; Sitticus bilineatus Saito, 1939; Dexippus lesserti Schenkel, 1963; Phintella melloteei (Simon, 1889)

= Phintella arenicolor =

Species of spider

Phintella arenicolor is a jumping spider species in the genus Phintella found in the Russian Far East, China, Korea, and Japan. It belongs to the tribe Chrysillini, which is ubiquitous across most continents.

== Taxonomy ==
Phintella arenicolor was originally described by Adolph Eduard Grube in 1861 as Attus arenicolor. The species has undergone numerous taxonomic revisions and has been placed in several different genera throughout its taxonomic history, including Maevia, Jotus, Sitticus, Dexippus, and Icius, before being definitively placed in Phintella by Logunov and Wesołowska in 1992.

The species was previously synonymized with Phintella castriesiana by Prószyński in 1979, but this synonymy was later rejected after renewed examination of the type material revealed that P. arenicolor constitutes a valid species.

== Distribution ==
P. arenicolor is widely distributed across East Asia. It has been recorded from the Russian Far East, China, Korea, and Japan. In China, the species has been found in multiple provinces including Jilin, Zhejiang, Hubei, Hunan, Guangxi, Yunnan, Shaanxi, and Gansu. The species has also been reported from Romania, Russia, and Japan based on collection records.

== Habitat ==
The species has been found in various habitats including swampy woods and meadows with grass. Collection records indicate it inhabits areas at elevations ranging from 700 to 1300 meters.

== Description ==
Phintella arenicolor is a small jumping spider showing distinct sexual dimorphism in size and coloration. Males have a body length of 4.30-4.50 mm with a cephalothorax length of 1.65 mm and width of 1.45 mm. The opisthosoma measures 2.20 mm in length and 1.20 mm in width. Females are slightly larger, with a body length of 4.00-5.00 mm and a cephalothorax measuring 1.75 mm in length and 2.30 mm in width. The female abdomen is 2.50 mm long and 1.45 mm wide.

The male has a light yellow carapace with a translucent covering of scales, particularly brown scales on the posterior portion. The sternum, labium, and maxillae are yellow, while the chelicerae are yellow with dark longitudinal stripes. The abdomen is elongated and oval-shaped with a pale yellow background and darker ornamental patterns. The legs are yellow, with the first pair being particularly robust and bearing dark brown markings.

Females are generally paler than males, with a light brown carapace and uniform yellow chelicerae and legs. The epigyne is weakly sclerotized with relatively straight insemination ducts and spherical spermathecae.

The species can be distinguished from the closely related Phintella castriesiana by differences in the male's tibial apophysis structure, the thinner apical part of the tegulum, and distinct body coloration patterns.
