= Phintella kaptega =

Scientific classification
- Kingdom: Animalia
- Phylum: Arthropoda
- Subphylum: Chelicerata
- Class: Arachnida
- Order: Araneae
- Infraorder: Araneomorphae
- Family: Salticidae
- Genus: Phintella
- Species: P. kaptega

Binomial name
- Phintella kaptega Dawidowicz & Wesołowska, 2016

Species of jumping spider

Phintella kaptega is a species of jumping spider in the genus Phintella that lives in Kenya and Uganda. The species is named after the area around the Kaptega river where it was first found. It is a small spider with a light brown or yellowish carapace that has a dark line along its edge. The abdomen is between 1.95 and 2.2 mm (0.08 and 0.09 in) long and has light brown markings on a yellow background. It has generally yellow legs apart from its first pair, which are brown. The male's front legs are also longer than the others. The spider was first described in 2016 and is distinguished from others in the genus by the large pockets in the female's epigyne and the unusual curved shape of the male's tibial apophysis.

== Taxonomy and etymology ==
Phintella kaptega is a species of jumping spider, a member of the family Salticidae, that was first described by the arachnologists Angelika Dawidowicz and Wanda Wesołowska in 2016. The specific name is derived from the name of the area where it first found. It is one of over 500 species identified by Wesołowska in her lifetime.

The genus Phintella was circumscribed in 1906 by Embrik Strand and W. Bösenberg. The genus name derives from the genus Phintia, which it resembles. The genus Phintia was itself renamed Phintodes, which was subsequently absorbed into Tylogonus. There are similarities between spiders within genus Phintella and those in Chira, Chrysilla, Euophrys, Icius, Jotus and Telamonia. Genetic analysis confirms that it is related to the genera Helvetia and Menemerus. It is a member of the tribe Heliophaninae, renamed Chrysillini by Wayne Maddison in 2015. Chrysillines are monophyletic. The tribe is ubiquitous across most of the continents of the world. It is allocated to the subclade Saltafresia in the clade Salticoida. In 2017, Jerzy Prószyński grouped the genus with 32 other genera of jumping spiders under the name Chrysillines in the supergroup Chrysilloida.

== Description ==
The spider was initially described by Dawidowicz and Wesołowska based on specimen in the collection of the Swedish arachnologist Åke Holm. The spider's body is divided into two main parts: a cephalothorax and an abdomen. The cephalothorax measures between 1.5 and 1.7 mm (0.06 and 0.07 in) in length and between 1.2 mm (0.05 in) and 1.5 mm in width. The female is slightly smaller and lighter than the male. The spider's carapace, the hard top section of the cephalothorax is shaped like a pear with two streaks on its side and a dark line along its edges. The male is very light brown and the female is yellowish. It has a few brown bristles on it and white hairs that form a patch near the spider's fovea. The part of the spider's face known as its clypeus is low and dark. There are dark rings and white scales around the spider's eyes. Its chelicerae are brownish and long with a single tooth at the back and two at the front. The remaining mouthparts, including its labium and maxillae, are brownish with a paler tips. The male has longer chelicerae than the female.

The spider's abdomen is ovoid in shape, narrowing towards the back. The male's abdomen is typically 2.2 mm (0.09 in) long and 1 mm (0.04 in) wide, while the female's is 1.5 mm long and 1.4 mm (0.06 in) wide. The top of the abdomen is yellowish with a pattern of irregular brownish-beige markings and a small spot on the top. The bottom of the abdomen is lighter with a darker middle. It has light yellow spinnerets. The spider's front legs are dark brown and are marked with dense long black hairs. The male's front legs are longer and stouter than the others. The remaining legs are yellow marked with brown streaks.

The species is similar to Phintella aequipes but differs in the design of its copulatory organs. The male has small, light brown pedipalps with a covering of white hairs. The spider's palpal bulb is triangular with a large bulge at its base and a short spiky embolus extending from its top. projecting from the top. The palpal tibia is hairy and has a projection, called a tibial apophysis, that has a distinctive shape. It is curved so that it follows a Sigmoid function. The female has very large pockets that occupy almost half of the epigyne, the external visible part of its copulatory organs, which is distinctive for the species, and a notch on the edge at the back.

== Distribution ==
Phintella kaptega has been found in Kenya and Uganda. It was first identified from examples discovered on the slopes of Mount Elgon in Kenya near the Kaptega River. The first spiders of the species to be found in Uganda were seen in Budongo Forest in 1995.
