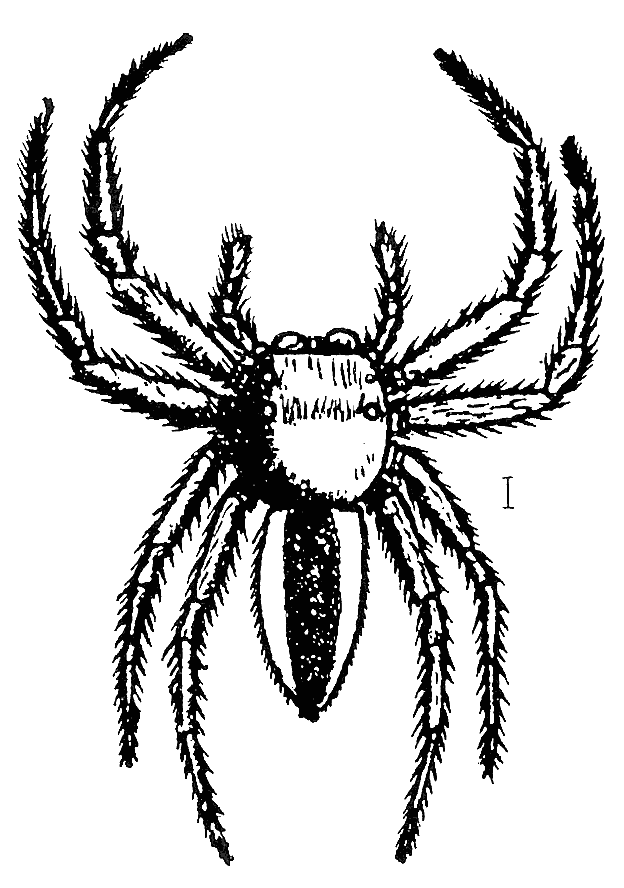
- The related male Phintella versicolor

Scientific classification
- Kingdom: Animalia
- Phylum: Arthropoda
- Subphylum: Chelicerata
- Class: Arachnida
- Order: Araneae
- Infraorder: Araneomorphae
- Family: Salticidae
- Genus: Phintella
- Species: P. brevis

Binomial name
- Phintella brevis Wesołowska & Russell-Smith, 2022

= Phintella brevis =

Species of spider

Phintella brevis is a species of jumping spider in the genus Phintella that lives in Ivory Coast. First described by Wanda Wesołowska and Anthony Russell-Smith in 2022, the spider is small, with a cephalothorax between 2.0 and 2.1 mm (0.079 and 0.083 in) long and an abdomen between 1.9 and 2.0 mm (0.075 and 0.079 in) long. Only the female has been described. The carapace is brown and the abdomen yellow. Although similar to the related Phintella lucida, the copulatory organs are distinctive, particular the tip of the spike on the tibia, the tibial apophysis.

== Taxonomy ==
Phintella brevis is a species of jumping spider, a member of the family Salticidae that was first described in 2022 by Wanda Wesołowska and Anthony Russell-Smith. The species is one of more than 500 described by Wesołowska during her career. It was allocated to the genus Phintella, first raised in 1906 by Embrik Strand and W. Bösenberg. The genus has a name that is derived from the genus Phintia, which it resembles. The spider's specific name is the Latin word for short, and relates to the length of the embolus. The genus Phintia was itself renamed Phintodes, which was subsequently absorbed into Tylogonus. There are similarities between spiders within genus Phintella and those in Chira, Chrysilla, Euophrys, Icius, Jotus and Telamonia. Genetic analysis confirms that it is related to the genera Helvetia and Menemerus and is classified in the tribe Chrysillini, named after the genus Chrysilla. In 2017, Jerzy Prószyński grouped the genus with 32 other genera of jumping spiders under the name Chrysillines in the supergroup Chrysilloida.

== Description ==
Phintella brevis is a small spider. The male has a cephalothorax that has a length between 2.0 and 2.1 mm (0.079 and 0.083 in) and a width between 1.4 and 1.5 mm (0.055 and 0.059 in). It has a brown carapace with a lighter eye field, a cross made up of white hairs on the thorax and a white band towards the rear. The Chelicerae are long and brown, with two small teeth and the front and one at the back. The remainder of the mouthparts are lighter. The spinnerets are yellow. The abdomen is between 1.9 and 2.0 mm (0.075 and 0.079 in) long and between 1.1 and 1.2 mm (0.043 and 0.047 in) wide. It is a yellow oval with a vague red pattern with a yellow-white underside. The legs are yellow, with colourless hairs and brown spines. The pedipalps are brown and have white hairs on the top side. The embolus is very short and spiked. The tibial apophysis, or spike, has a small jagged edge, shaped like a tooth, at its tip. It has similar colouring to the related Phintella lucida but can be distinguished by the shape of the end of the tibial apophysis. The female has not been described.

== Distribution and habitat ==
Phintella brevis is endemic to Ivory Coast. The male holotype was found in Lamto in 1975. Other examples have been found near Mount Niangbo. The species thrives in savanna or on the branches of shrubs.
