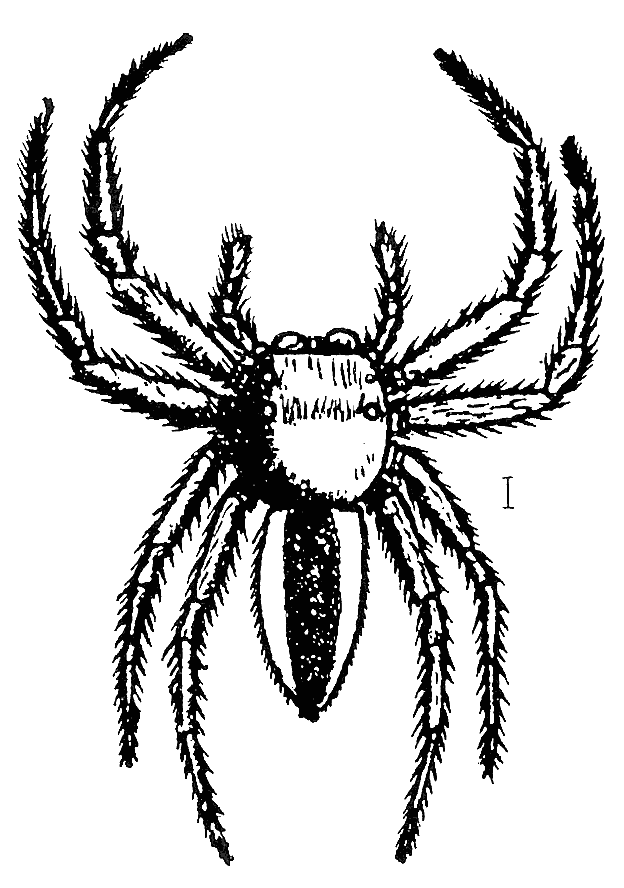
- The related male Phintella versicolor

Scientific classification
- Kingdom: Animalia
- Phylum: Arthropoda
- Subphylum: Chelicerata
- Class: Arachnida
- Order: Araneae
- Infraorder: Araneomorphae
- Family: Salticidae
- Genus: Phintella
- Species: P. pygmaea

Binomial name
- Phintella pygmaea Wesołowska, 1981

= Phintella pygmaea =

Species of spider

Phintella pygmaea is an endemic species of jumping spider in the genus Phintella that lives in China. It was first described in 1981 by Wanda Wesołowska from a holotype discovered in Guangdong. Only the female has been identified. The spider is small, with a brown cephalothorax and yellow abdomen. It has distinctive half-crescent markings on the cephalothorax and a ridge marked by two depressions on the small epigyne.

== Taxonomy ==
Euophrys pygmaea is a species of jumping spider that was first described in 1981 by Wanda Wesołowska. It was one of over 500 species identified by the Polish arahcnologist during her career. The species name is derived from the Latin word for dwarf. The genus, Euophrys was first described by Carl Ludwig Koch in 1834. The name derives from two Greek words, meaning good and eyelids.

In 2000, the species was moved to the genus Phintella by Dmitri V. Logunov and Yu M. Marusik based the appearance of the female holotype. This genus had been raised in 1906 by Embrik Strand and W. Bösenberg. The genus name derives from the genus Phintia, which it resembles. The genus Phintia was itself renamed Phintodes, which was subsequently absorbed into Tylogonus. There are similarities between spiders within genus Phintella and those in Chira, Chrysilla, Euophrys, Icius, Jotus and Telamonia. Genetic analysis confirms that it is related to the genera Helvetia and Menemerus and is classified in the tribe Chrysillini. There is some uncertainty about the exact taxonomy of the species as only one example has been identified.

== Description ==
Only the female has yet been identified. The spider was initially described based on a holotype specimen found in 1965. The spider is small, with a brown oval cephalothorax that measures 1.69 mm (0.067 in) in length. It has two distinctive lighter markings behind the eye field that are shaped like half crescents. The eye field itself is black. The abdomen is pale yellow, although slight traces of brown belts may be seen, and is 1.75 mm (0.069 in) long. The spider has a very small epigyne which has a ridge lined by two depressions.

== Distribution ==
Phintella pygmaea was first found in the Guangdong in China. The species is endemic to the country.
