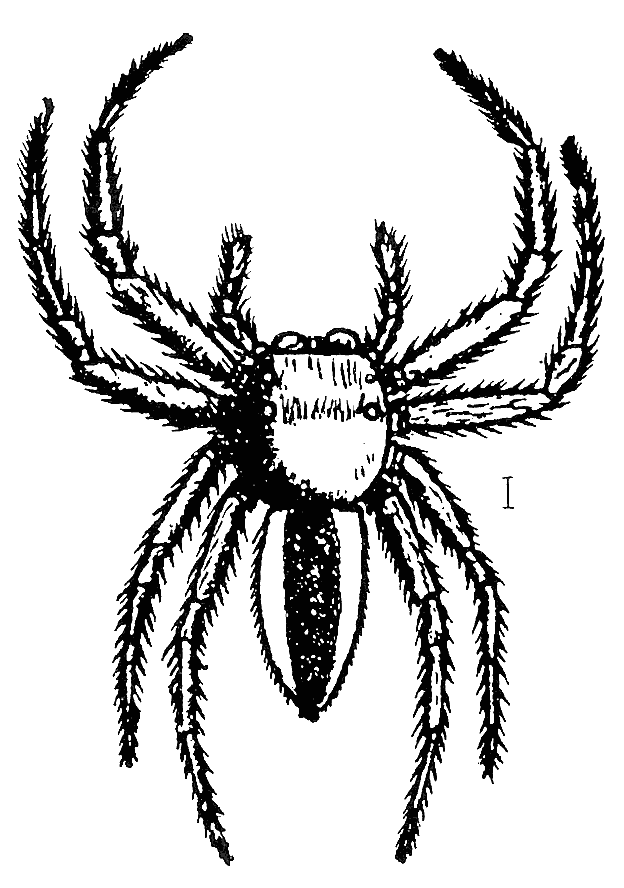
- The related male Phintella versicolor

Scientific classification
- Kingdom: Animalia
- Phylum: Arthropoda
- Subphylum: Chelicerata
- Class: Arachnida
- Order: Araneae
- Infraorder: Araneomorphae
- Family: Salticidae
- Genus: Phintella
- Species: P. lunda

Binomial name
- Phintella lunda Wesołowska, 2010

= Phintella lunda =

Species of spider

Phintella lunda is a species of jumping spider in the genus Phintella that lives in Angola. It was first described in 2010 by Wanda Wesołowska, and given a specific name to reflect the fact that it was first found in Lunda Sul Province. The spider is medium-sized and a similar shape to others in the genus. It has a very dark brown carapace that has edge markings and a greyish-brown abdomen that has streaks on the top and sides, but the main distinguishing feature are the copulatory organs. The male has a distinctive straight side to its palpal bulb, while the female has am epigyne which has two pockets and copulatory openings in cups.

== Taxonomy ==
Phintella lunda is a species of jumping spider, a member of the family Salticidae, that was first identified in 2010 by Wanda Wesołowska, one of over 500 species described by the Polish arachnologist during her career. The spider's specific name is derived from the name of the area where it was first found. The genus Phintella was raised in 1906 by Embrik Strand and W. Bösenberg. The genus name derives from the genus Phintia, which it resembles. The genus Phintia was itself renamed Phintodes, which was subsequently absorbed into Tylogonus. There are similarities between spiders within genus Phintella and those in Chira, Chrysilla, Euophrys, Icius, Jotus and Telamonia. Genetic analysis confirms that it is related to the genera Helvetia and Menemerus and is classified in the tribe Chrysillini.

== Description ==
The spider was initially described based on a holotype specimen found in a collection at the California Academy of Sciences in San Francisco. The spider is medium-sized and thin, with a shape that is typical of the genus. The dark brown carapace is oval, elongated, covered in short hairs and has a black and white line that lines its edges. The clypeus is very dark, while the oval abdomen is greyish brown with streaks along the middle and sides. The spinnerets are short and brown.

The female and male are similar in size, with an abdomen that ranges in length between 2.0 and 2.7 mm (0.079 and 0.106 in) and a cephalothorax that varies between 1.7 and 1.9 mm (0.067 and 0.075 in) in length. The male has a short embolus and triangular palpal bulb with a straight edge, a feature that is unusual in the genus. The female has two copulatory openings in distinctive cups at the very end of the epigyne, which has two wide pockets either side of a central depression.

== Distribution ==
Phintella lunda has only been found in the Lunda Sul Province in Angola. It is one of only a small number of species in the genus that have been found in Africa.
