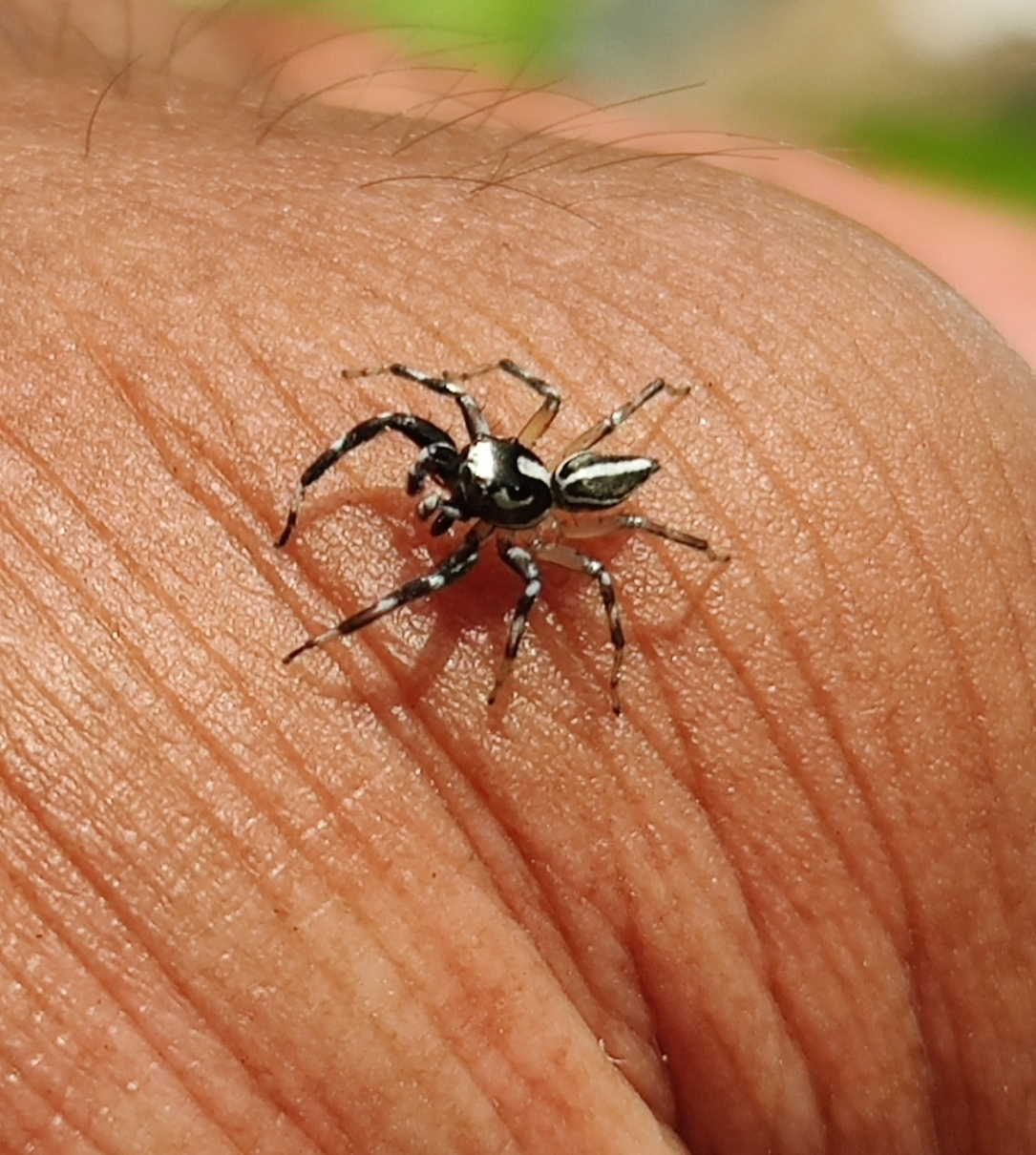
- Phintella platnicki from Kadumane, Sakleshpur, Karnataka

Scientific classification
- Kingdom: Animalia
- Phylum: Arthropoda
- Subphylum: Chelicerata
- Class: Arachnida
- Order: Araneae
- Infraorder: Araneomorphae
- Family: Salticidae
- Genus: Phintella
- Species: P. platnicki

Binomial name
- Phintella platnicki Sudhin, Sen & Caleb, 2023

= Phintella platnicki =

Species of spider

Phintella platnicki is a species of jumping spider from southern India.

== Range ==
Its type locality is Salem, Tamil Nadu. It is also found in Kerala and Karnataka.

== Etymology ==
Phintella platnicki has been named in honour of the late Norman I. Platnick for his contribution to the field of arachnology.
