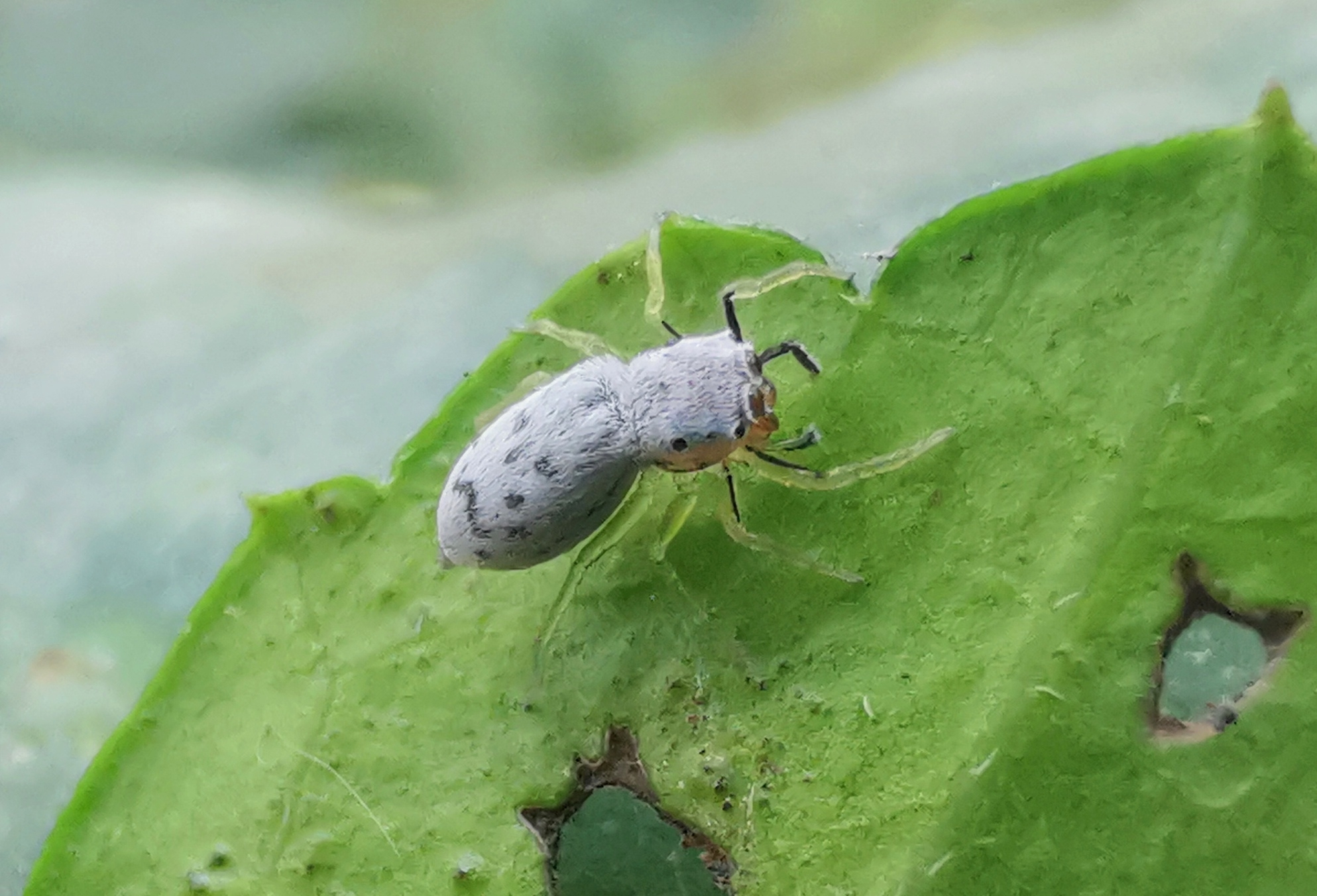
- female from Thailand
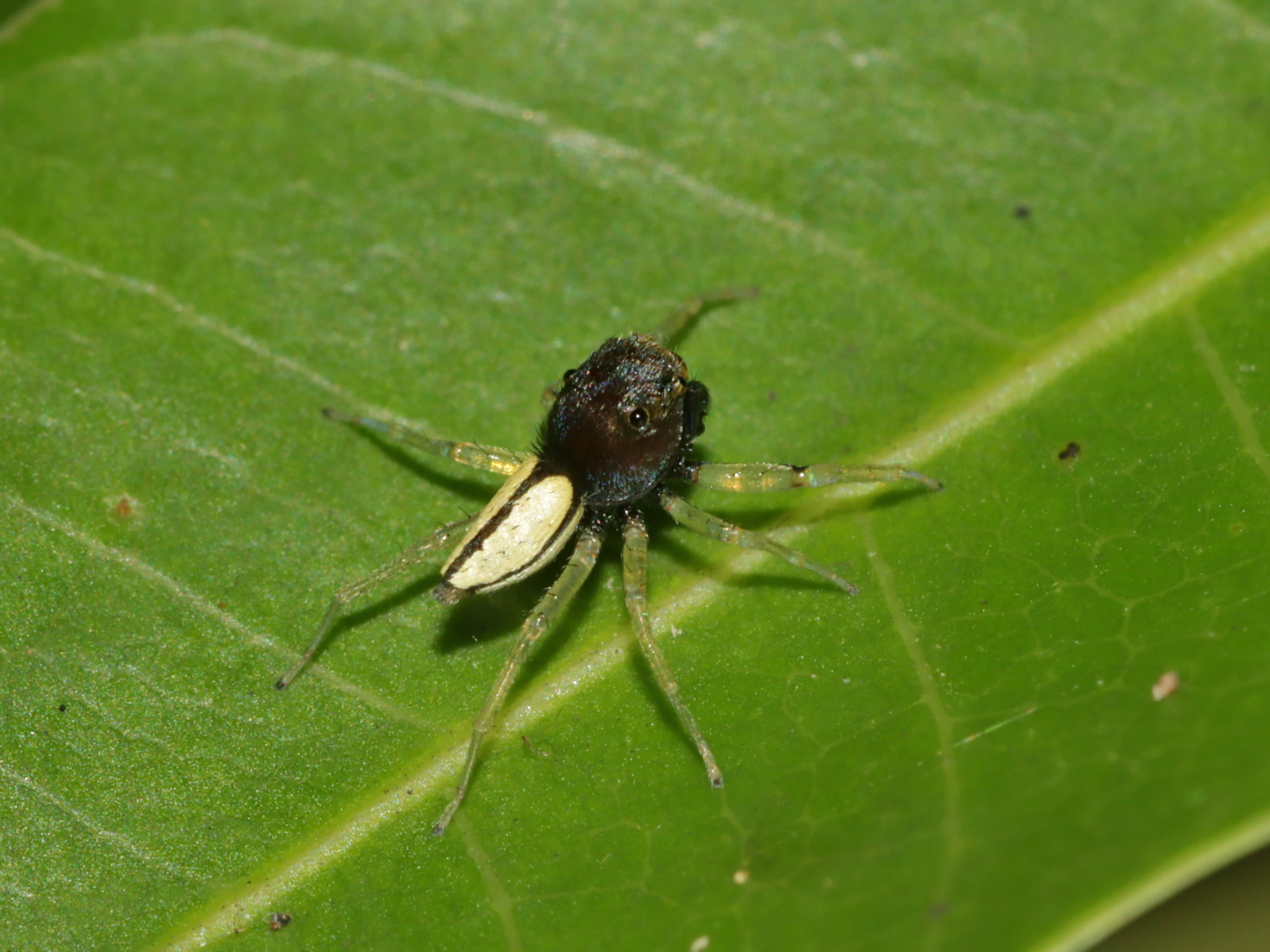
- male from Thailand

Scientific classification
- Kingdom: Animalia
- Phylum: Arthropoda
- Subphylum: Chelicerata
- Class: Arachnida
- Order: Araneae
- Infraorder: Araneomorphae
- Family: Salticidae
- Genus: Phintella
- Species: P. daklak

Binomial name
- Phintella daklak Hoang, 2023

= Phintella daklak =

Species of spider

Phintella daklak is a species of jumping spider in the genus Phintella. It was described from Vietnam in 2023.

== Taxonomy ==
The species was described by Q.D. Hoang in 2023 based on specimens collected from Dak Lak Province in the Central Highlands of Vietnam. The specific name daklak is derived from the type locality.

== Distribution ==
Specimens have been collected from two locations: Chu Yang Sin National Park in Krong Bong District at an elevation of 608 meters, and Buon Ma Thuot City at 392 meters above sea level. P. daklak have been found in Thailand.

== Description ==
Phintella daklak is a small jumping spider with males measuring approximately 1.78 mm in carapace length and females about 1.51 mm. Males have a reddish-brown carapace covered with dense black hairs and pale setae around the anterior eyes. The abdomen is yellowish with a dark longitudinal band on the dorsum and dark lateral bands. The legs are pale yellow except for dark bands on the femora.

Females have an orange carapace clothed with dense white hairs and white orbital setae around the anterior eyes. The abdomen is yellowish with scattered small black hair spots on the dorsum and darker lateral sides.

The male palpal structure is distinctive, featuring a short, pointed embolus directed at the "two o'clock" position, an elongated and bifurcated retrolateral tibial apophysis (RTA), and a long retrolateral lobe of the tegulum. The female epigyne has two small pockets with copulatory ducts that are narrow, almost straight, and converge posteriorly in a V-shape, with large spherical spermathecae that touch each other.
