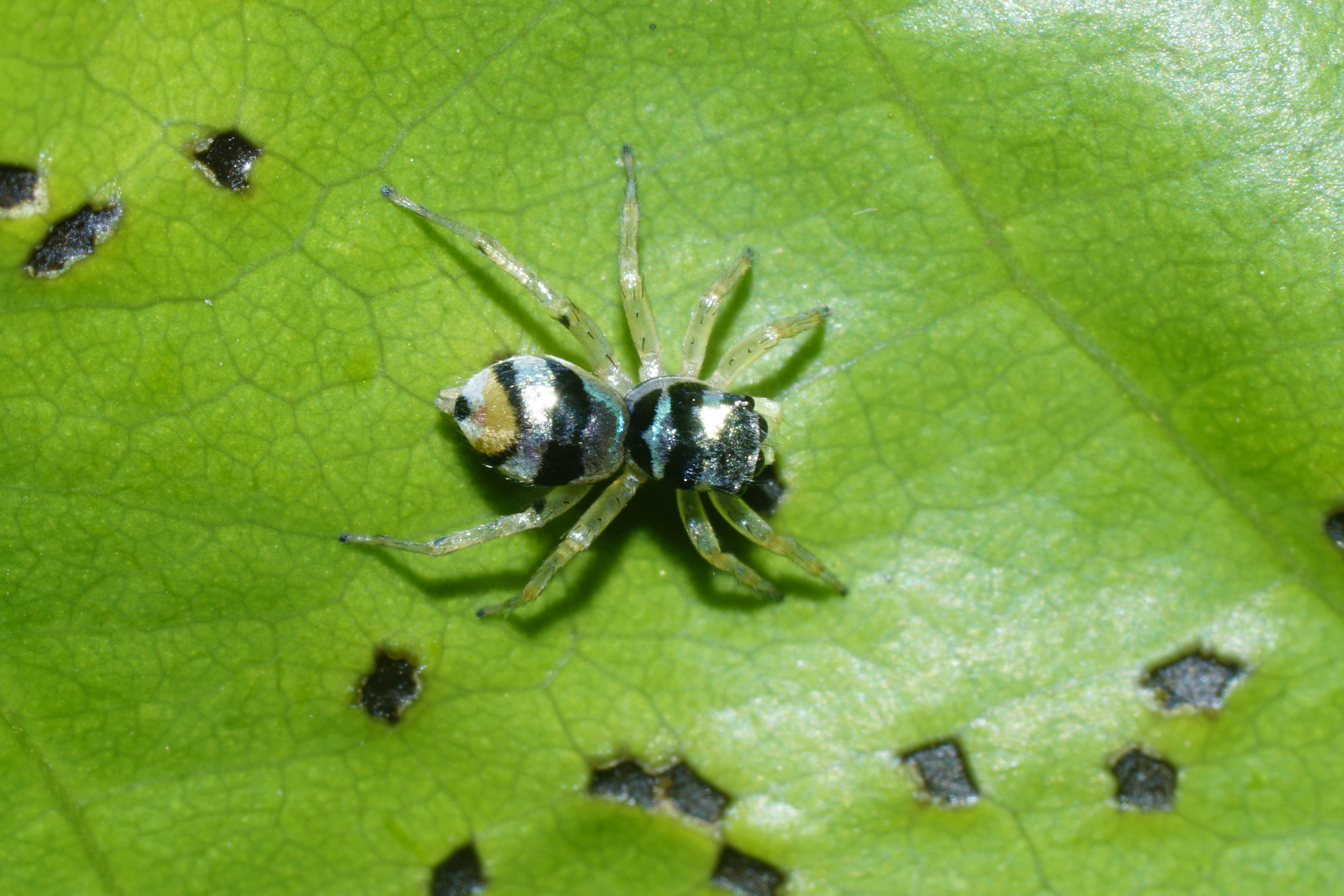
- female
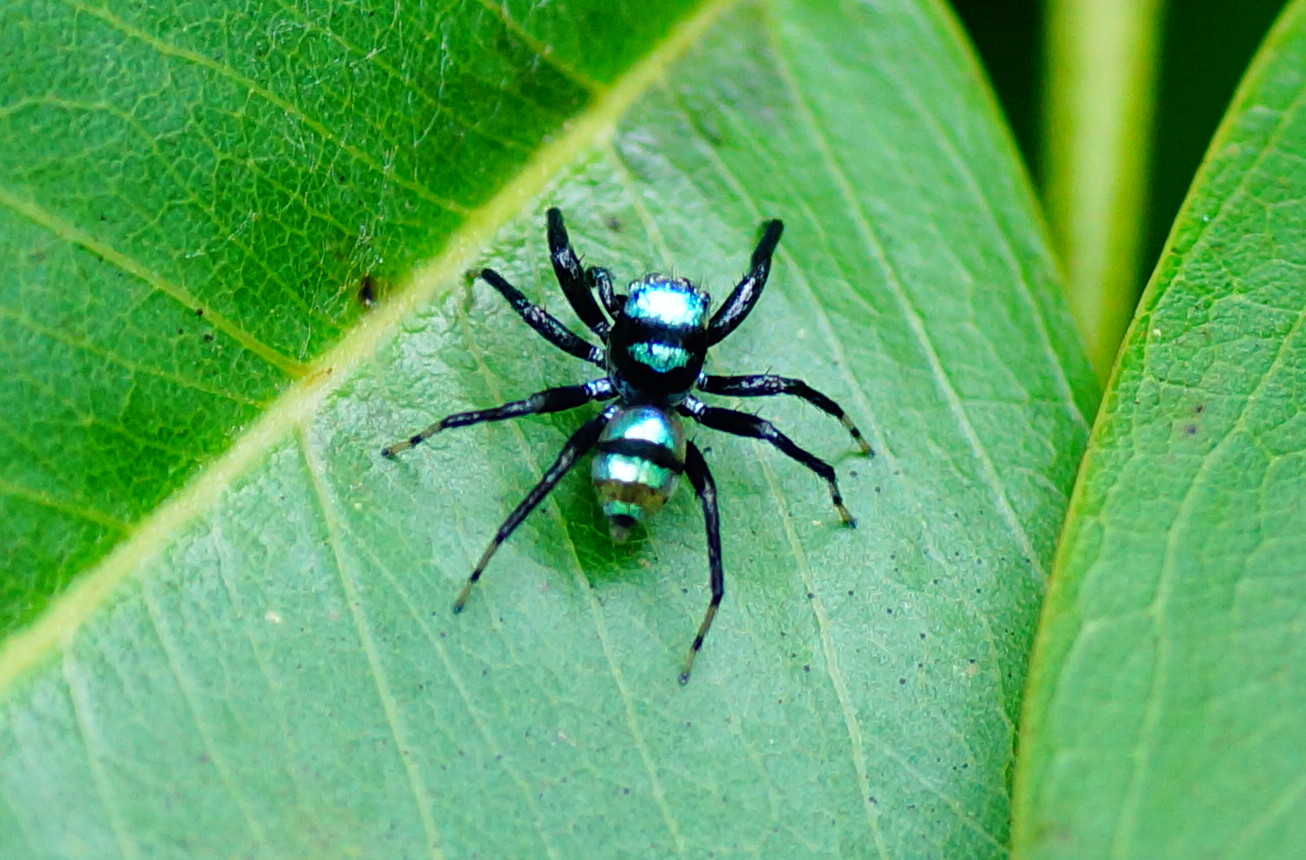
- male

Scientific classification
- Kingdom: Animalia
- Phylum: Arthropoda
- Subphylum: Chelicerata
- Class: Arachnida
- Order: Araneae
- Infraorder: Araneomorphae
- Family: Salticidae
- Genus: Phintella
- Species: P. vittata

Binomial name
- Phintella vittata (C. L. Koch, 1846)

Synonyms
- Plexippus vittatus C. L. Koch, 1846; Hyllus alternans C. L. Koch, 1846; Thiania vittata Simon, 1864; Maevia alternans Thorell, 1891; Maevia vittata Thorell, 1892; Telamonia vittata Simon, 1901; Salticus ranjitus Tikader, 1967; Chrysilla vittata Prószyński, 1971

= Phintella vittata =

Banded Phintella

Species of spider

Phintella vittata is a species of jumping spider in the genus Phintella. It has a wide distribution across Asia, ranging from India and Nepal through China to the Philippines, and is notable for being the first animal known to be capable of seeing ultraviolet B light.

== Description ==
P. vittata is a small spider with males measuring approximately 3.12 mm in total body length and females slightly larger at 3.30 mm. The species displays a distinctive metallic golden or bluish-brown coloration that is particularly vibrant under natural lighting conditions.

The male has a rectangular cephalothorax that is longer than wide, measuring 1.58 mm long and 1.45 mm wide, and is clothed with fine iridescent hairs of different metallic colors. The dorsum features two lateral and one median transverse white band. The eyes are pearly-white with black rings, and the anterior row of eyes is slightly recurved. The abdomen is oval and medially broad, decorated with metallic green-brown patches dorsally.

Females are similar in appearance but slightly larger, with the cephalothorax measuring 1.60 mm long and 1.50 mm wide, and the abdomen 1.70 mm long and 1.55 mm wide. The female's body has a mixture of metallic blue and brown coloration that appears slightly duller than the male's.

== Ultraviolet vision ==
P. vittata is remarkable for being the first known animal capable of detecting ultraviolet B light, while other animals including some insects, birds, fish, and mammals can only see ultraviolet A light. Males have patches on their abdomens that reflect UVB light which can be detected by females, likely playing a role in sexual selection and mate recognition.

== Distribution ==
P. vittata has a wide distribution across Asia, from India, Nepal, and Bangladesh through China to the Philippines.
