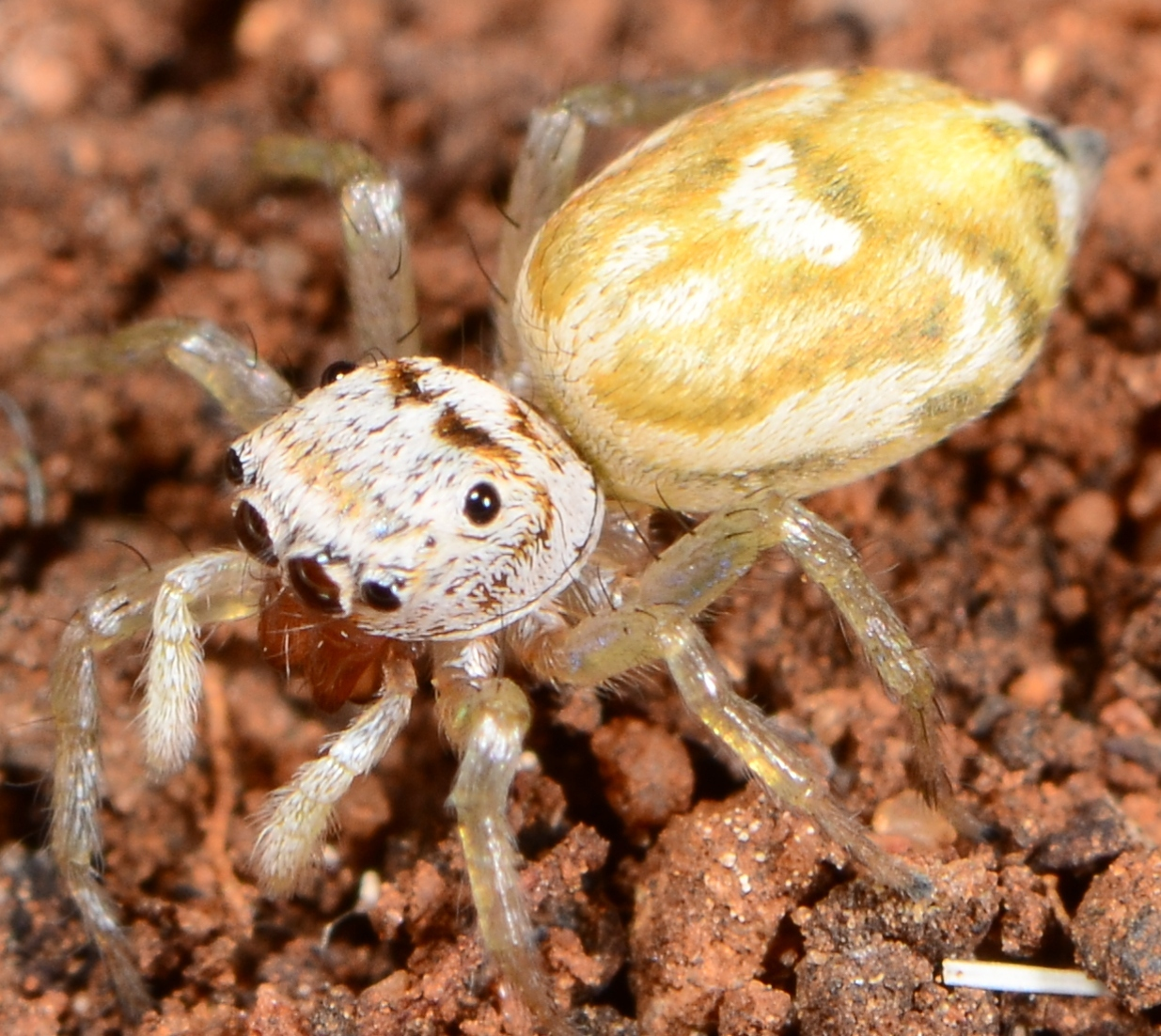
- Female P. lajuma
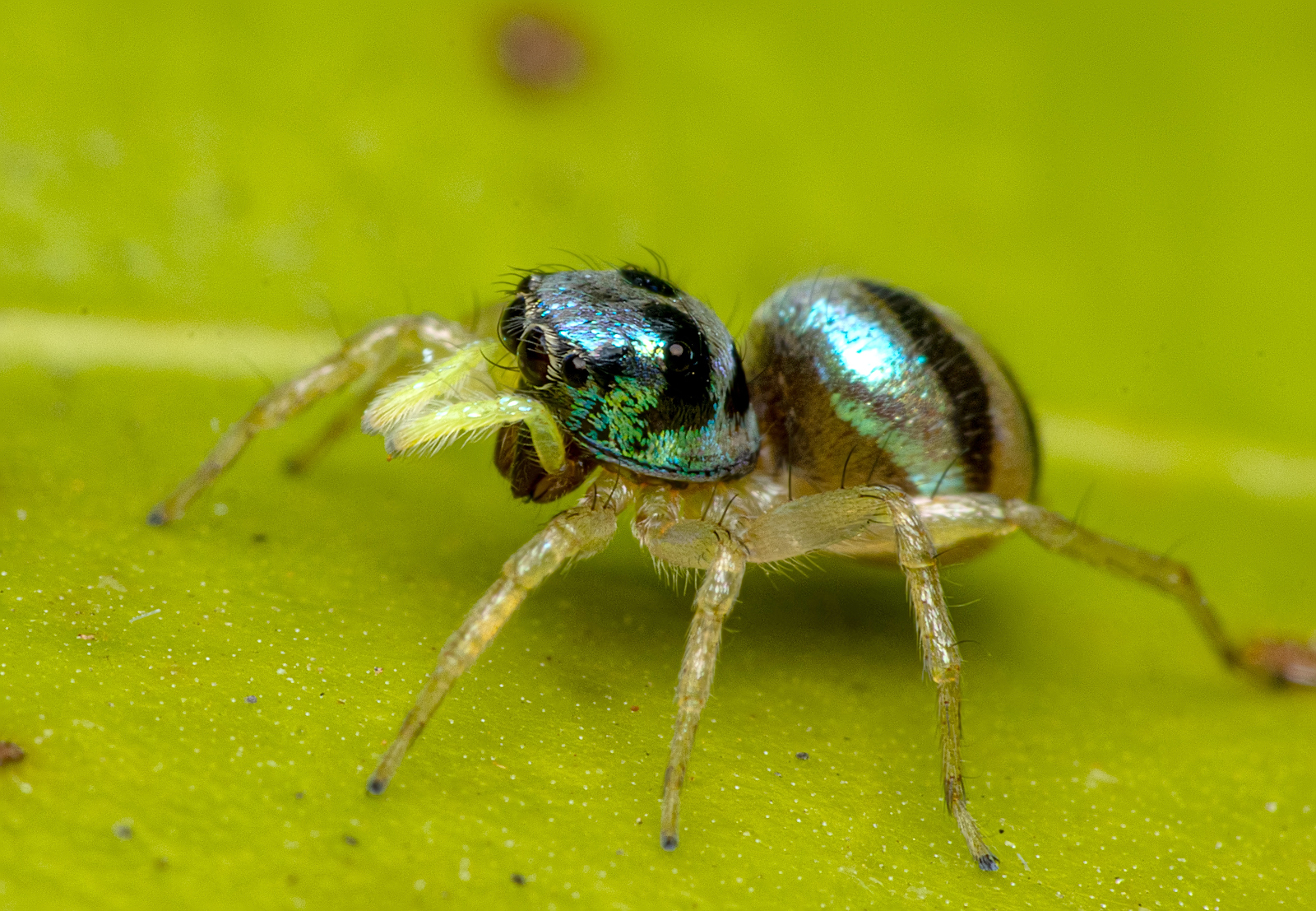
- Male Phintella vittata

Scientific classification
- Kingdom: Animalia
- Phylum: Arthropoda
- Subphylum: Chelicerata
- Class: Arachnida
- Order: Araneae
- Infraorder: Araneomorphae
- Family: Salticidae
- Subfamily: Salticinae
- Genus: Phintella; Strand, 1906

Type species
- P. bifurcilinea (Bösenberg & Strand, 1906)

Species
- 88, see text

= Phintella =

Genus of spiders

Phintella is a genus of jumping spiders found in Eurasia, Africa, and some islands in the western Pacific. It includes 59 species.

== Taxonomy ==
The genus Phintella was circumscribed in 1906 by W. Bösenberg and Embrik Strand. The genus name derives from the genus Phintia, which it resembles.

The genus Phintia was itself renamed Phintodes, which was subsequently absorbed into Tylogonus. There are similarities between spiders within genus Phintella and those in Chira, Chrysilla, Euophrys, Icius, Jotus and Telamonia. Genetic analysis confirms that it is related to the genera Helvetia and Menemerus. It is a member of the tribe Heliophaninae, renamed Chrysillini by Wayne Maddison in 2015. Chrysillines are monophyletic. The tribe is ubiquitous across most of the continents of the world. It is allocated to the subclade Saltafresia in the clade Salticoida. In 2017, Jerzy Prószyński grouped the genus with 32 other genera of jumping spiders under the name Chrysillines in the supergroup Chrysilloida.

== Species ==
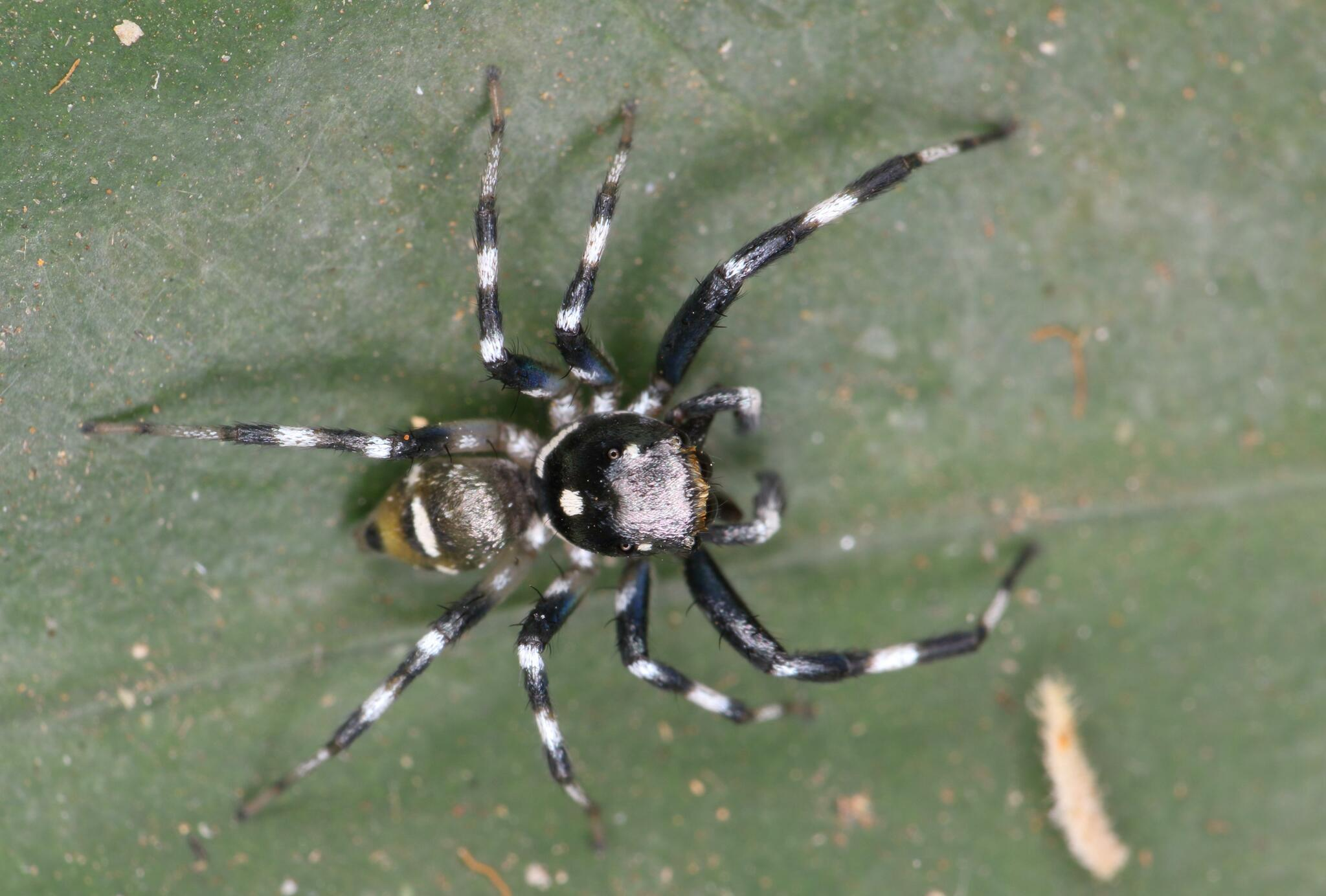
P. aequipes

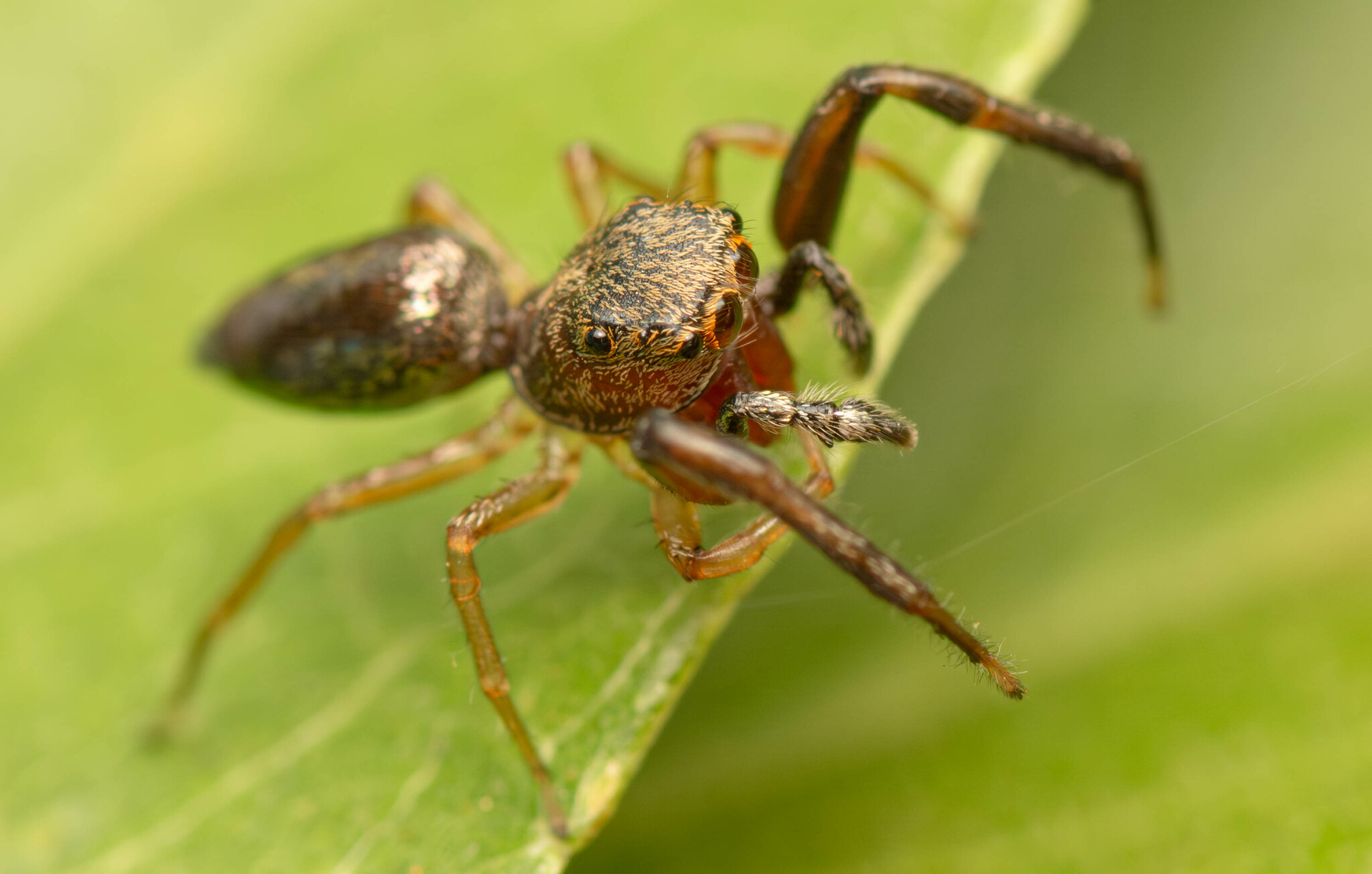
P. australis

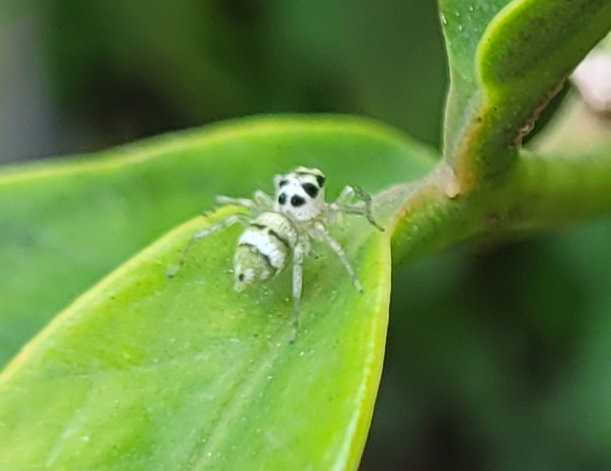
Female Phintella piatensis

As of October 2025, this genus includes 88 species:

- Phintella abnormis (Bösenberg & Strand, 1906) – Russia (Far East), China, Korea, Japan
- Phintella accentifera (Simon, 1901) – India
- Phintella aequipeiformis Żabka, 1985 – China, Vietnam
- Phintella aequipes (G. W. Peckham & E. G. Peckham, 1903) – Ivory Coast, Ghama, Nigeria, Uganda, Kenya, Tanzania, Zimbabwe, Mozambique, South Africa
- Phintella africana Wesołowska & Tomasiewicz, 2008 – Ethiopia
- Phintella albopatella (Petrunkevitch, 1914) – Myanmar
- Phintella arcuata Huang, Wang & Peng, 2015 – China
- Phintella arenicolor (Grube, 1861) – Russia (Far East), China, Korea, Japan
- Phintella argentea Kanesharatnam & Benjamin, 2019 – Sri Lanka
- Phintella argenteola (Simon, 1903) – Vietnam
- Phintella assamica Prószyński, 1992 – India, Laos
- Phintella australis (Simon, 1902) – South Africa
- Phintella banna Wang & Li, 2020 – China
- Phintella bella Wiśniewski & Wesołowska, 2024 – Uganda
- Phintella bidentata Biswas, 2025 – Bangladesh
- Phintella bifurcata Prószyński, 1992 – India
- Phintella bifurcilinea (Bösenberg & Strand, 1906) – Korea, Japan, China, Vietnam (type species)
- Phintella brevis Wesołowska & Russell-Smith, 2022 – Guinea, Ivory Coast, Ghana, Uganda
- Phintella bunyiae Barrion & Litsinger, 1995 – Philippines
- Phintella caledoniensis Patoleta, 2009 – New Caledonia
- Phintella candramawa Dhiya'ulhaq, 2025 – Indonesia (Sumatra)
- Phintella castor Dhiya'ulhaq, 2025 – Indonesia (Sumatra)
- Phintella castriesiana (Grube, 1861) – Canary Islands, Southern Europe, North Africa, Middle East, Turkey, Caucasus, Iran, Russia (Far East), Korea, Japan
- Phintella cavaleriei (Schenkel, 1963) – China, Korea
- Phintella cholkei Prajapati, Kumbhar, Caleb, Sanap & Kamboj, 2021 – India
- Phintella chopardi (Berland & Millot, 1941) – Ivory Coast, Uganda
- Phintella chunfen Yang, Wang & Zhang, 2024 – China
- Phintella clathrata (Thorell, 1895) – Myanmar
- Phintella conradi Prószyński & Deeleman-Reinhold, 2012 – Indonesia (Sumatra)
- Phintella coonooriensis Prószyński, 1992 – India
- Phintella daklak Hoang, 2023 – Vietnam
- Phintella debilis (Thorell, 1891) – India to Taiwan, Vietnam, Indonesia (Java)
- Phintella dentis Sudhin, Caleb & Sen, 2024 – India
- Phintella dhritiae Sudhin, Sen & Caleb, 2023 – India
- Phintella dives (Simon, 1899) – Indonesia (Sumatra)
- Phintella elegans Haddad, Wiśniewski & Wesołowska, 2024 – Mozambique
- Phintella fanjingshan Li, Wang, Zhang & Chen, 2019 – China
- Phintella fodingensis C. Wang, Mi & Peng, 2023 – China
- Phintella globosa Wesołowska & Russell-Smith, 2022 – Ivory Coast, Uganda
- Phintella hainani Song, Gu & Chen, 1988 – China (Hainan)
- Phintella handersoni Sen, Sudhin & Caleb, 2024 – India, China, Vietnam
- Phintella hongkan Wang, Gan & Mi, 2024 – China (Hainan)
- Phintella incerta Wesołowska & Russell-Smith, 2000 – Tanzania
- Phintella jaleeli Kanesharatnam & Benjamin, 2019 – Sri Lanka
- Phintella jiugongensis C. Wang, Mi & Peng, 2023 – China
- Phintella jucunda Wiśniewski & Wesołowska, 2024 – Uganda
- Phintella kaptega Dawidowicz & Wesołowska, 2016 – Guinea, Uganda, Kenya
- Phintella lajuma Haddad & Wesołowska, 2013 – South Africa
- Phintella lepidus Cao & Li, 2016 – China
- Phintella liae C. Wang, Mi & Peng, 2023 – China
- Phintella linea (Karsch, 1879) – Russia (Far East), China, Korea, Japan
- Phintella liui C. Wang, Mi & Peng, 2023 – China (Hainan)
- Phintella longapophysis Lei & Peng, 2013 – China
- Phintella lucida Wesołowska & Tomasiewicz, 2008 – Ethiopia, Kenya
- Phintella luna Sudhin, Sen & Caleb, 2024 – India
- Phintella lunda Wesołowska, 2010 – Angola
- Phintella macrops (Simon, 1901) – India
- Phintella mii Wang & Li, 2020 – China
- Phintella minor (Lessert, 1925) – Guinea, Ivory Coast
- Phintella monteithi Żabka, 2012 – Australia (Queensland)
- Phintella multimaculata (Simon, 1901) – Sri Lanka
- Phintella nilgirica Prószyński, 1992 – India
- Phintella nilotica Wiśniewski & Wesołowska, 2024 – Uganda
- Phintella occidentalis Wesołowska & Russell-Smith, 2022 – Ivory Coast
- Phintella paludosa Wesołowska & Edwards, 2012 – Guinea, Ivory Coast, Nigeria, Mozambique
- Phintella panda Huang, Wang & Peng, 2015 – China
- Phintella parva (Wesołowska, 1981) – Russia (Far East), China, Korea
- Phintella piatensis Barrion & Litsinger, 1995 – Philippines
- Phintella planiceps Berry, Beatty & Prószyński, 1996 – Caroline Is.
- Phintella platnicki Sudhin, Sen & Caleb, 2023 – India
- Phintella popovi (Prószyński, 1979) – Russia (South Siberia, Far East), China, Korea
- Phintella pulcherrima Huang, Wang & Peng, 2015 – China
- Phintella pygmaea (Wesołowska, 1981) – China
- Phintella rajbharathi Caleb, Sudhin & Sen, 2024 – India
- Phintella reinhardti (Thorell, 1891) – India (Nicobar Is.)
- Phintella sancha Cao & Li, 2016 – China, Vietnam
- Phintella siginjai Dhiya'ulhaq, 2025 – Indonesia (Sumatra)
- Phintella suavis (Simon, 1886) – Malaysia
- Phintella suavisoides Lei & Peng, 2013 – China
- Phintella subpanda C. Wang, Mi & Peng, 2023 – China
- Phintella sufflava (Jastrzebski, 2009) – Bhutan
- Phintella suknana Prószyński, 1992 – India
- Phintella transversa Wesołowska & Russell-Smith, 2022 – Ivory Coast
- Phintella vittata (C. L. Koch, 1846) – India, Nepal, Bangladesh, China to Philippines
- Phintella wandae C. Wang, Mi & Peng, 2023 – China
- Phintella wulingensis Huang, Wang & Peng, 2015 – China
- Phintella yi Yang, Wang & Zhang, 2024 – China
- Phintella yinae Lei & Peng, 2013 – China
