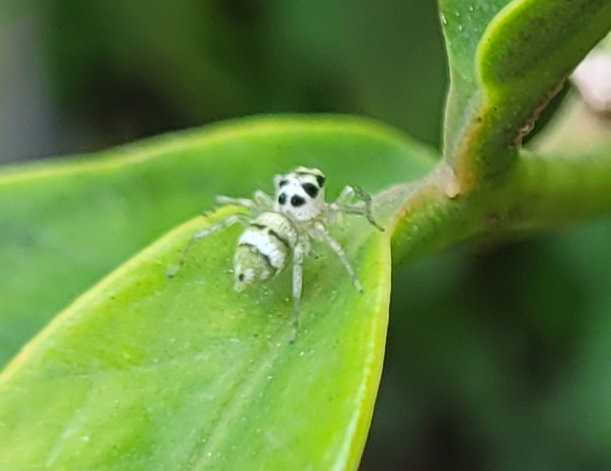
- Female Phintella piatensis from Bukidnon
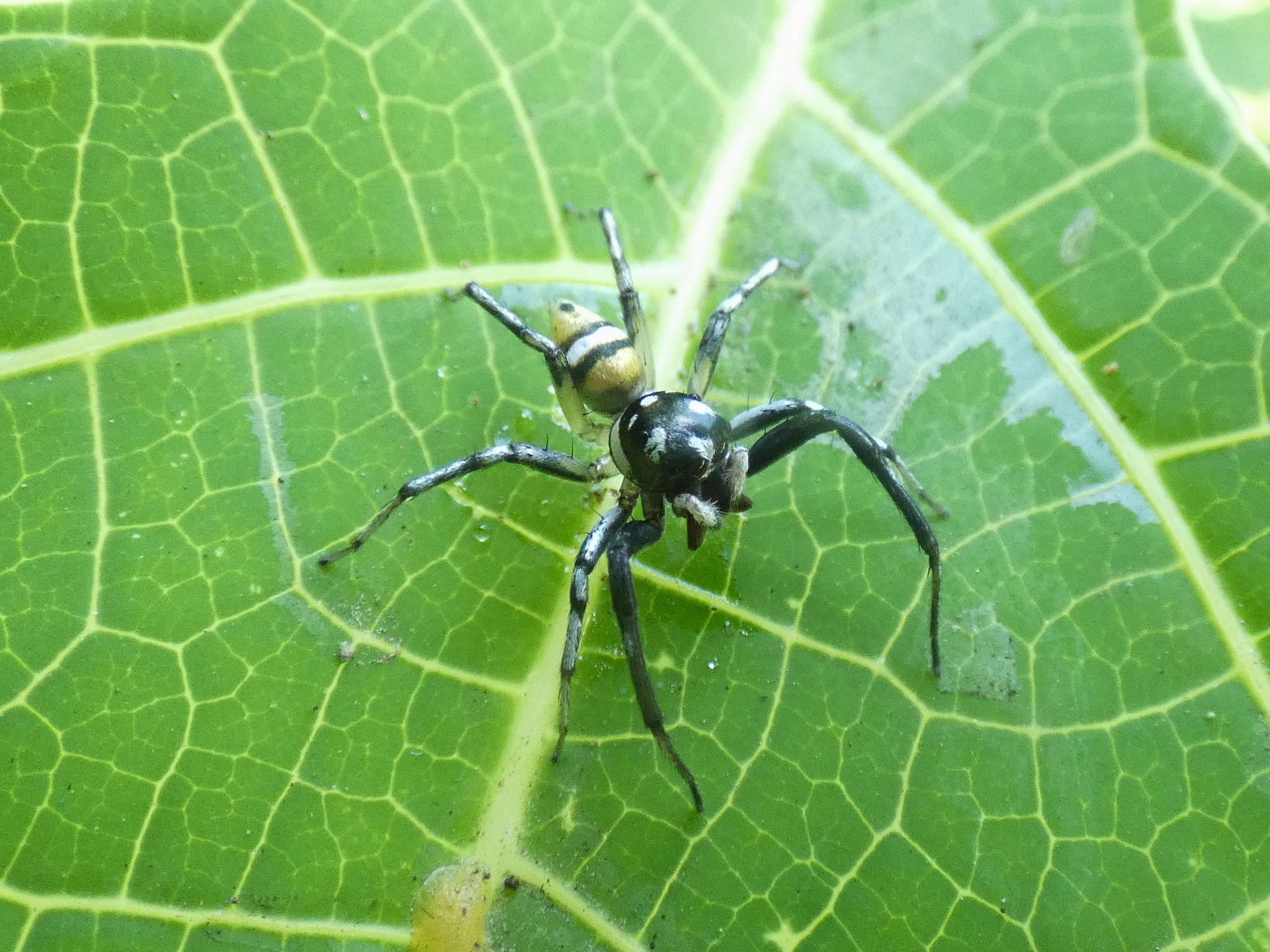
- Male Phintella piatensis from Southern Leyte

Scientific classification
- Kingdom: Animalia
- Phylum: Arthropoda
- Subphylum: Chelicerata
- Class: Arachnida
- Order: Araneae
- Infraorder: Araneomorphae
- Family: Salticidae
- Genus: Phintella
- Species: P. piatensis

Binomial name
- Phintella piatensis Barrion & Litsinger, 1995

= Phintella piatensis =

Species of spider

Phintella piatensis is a species of jumping spider endemic to the Philippines.

== Description ==
Phintella piatensis is sexually dimorphic. Females are around 4.28 mm (0.169 in) in length. The cephalothorax is white to yellowish brown with black spots surrounding the 4 posterior eyes, as well as another pair of black spots behind the fovea. Along with the two frontal eyes, it gives the appearance of the cephalothorax having 10 black spots. The chelicerae are yellow-brown in color. The abdomen is ovoid in shape and yellow-green in color, with a thick crosswise white band in the middle, flanked by two other thinner grayish-black bands (the front band is sometimes reduced to two spots). These bands usually have a narrow space bisecting them lengthwise. Another black spot is present at the posterior tip of the abdomen. The legs are a pale yellow with brown spines and claw tufts. It has a leg formula of 3412.

Male Phintella piatensis are larger than females, being around 4.94 mm (0.194 in) in length. The cephalothorax has dark areas surrounding the eyes which are connected in the middle, giving it the appearance of having six white spots. Two wide white bands are also present along the sides of the posterior of the cephalothorax. The chelicerae are long and light brown. The abdomen is elongated, with a similar pattern to females but it is usually more boldly colored. The legs are darker than in females, with a leg formula of 4132.

== Range ==
Phintella piatensis is endemic to the Philippines.

== Etymology ==
Phintella piatensis is named after the municipality of Piat, Cagayan where the female type specimen was collected.

== Taxonomy ==
The female of Phintella piatensis was first described by the arachnologists Alberto T. Barrion and James A. Litsinger in 1995. The male was first described by arachnologists Mario Freudenschuss and Michael Seiter in 2016.
