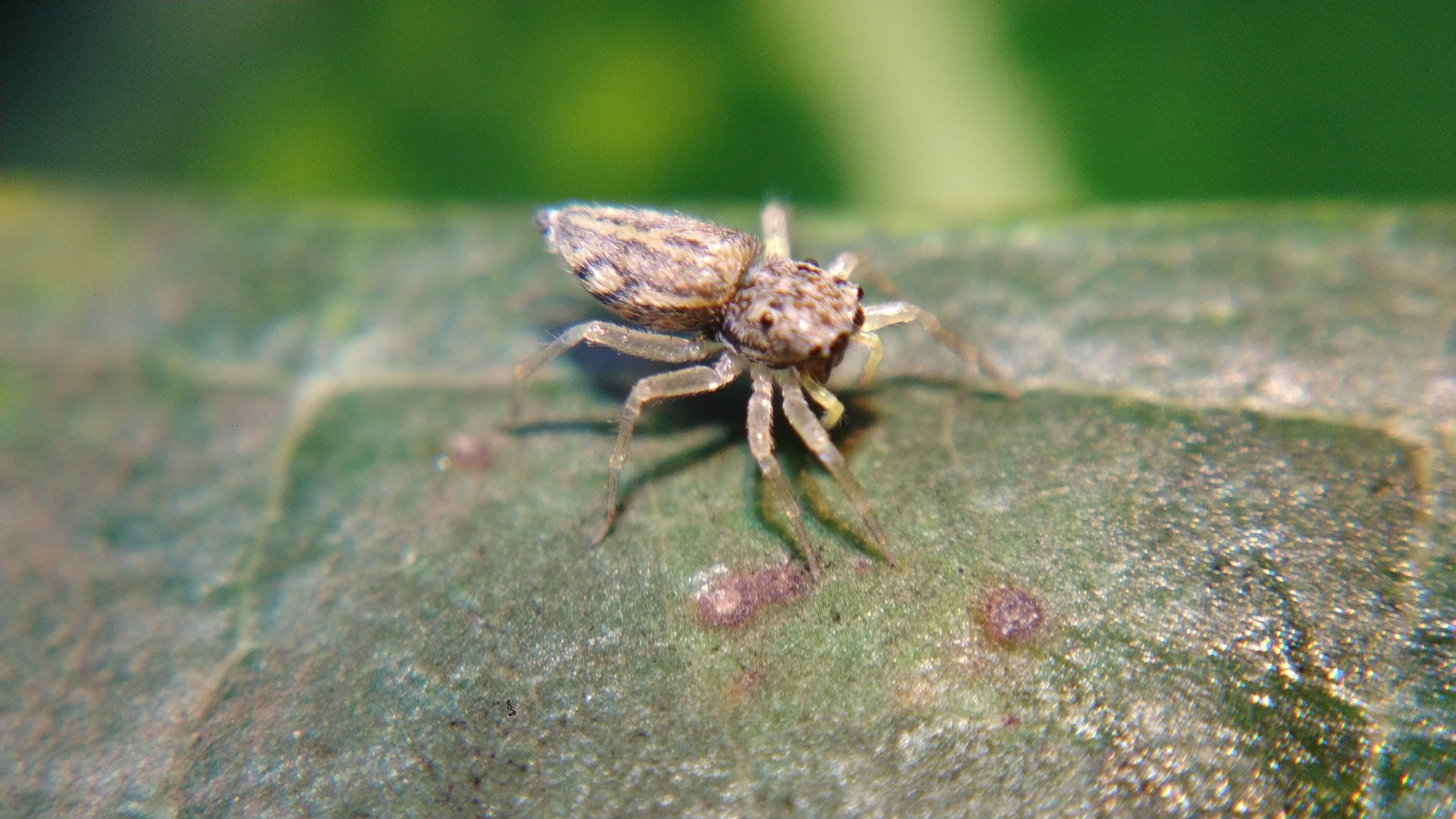
- female from Thailand
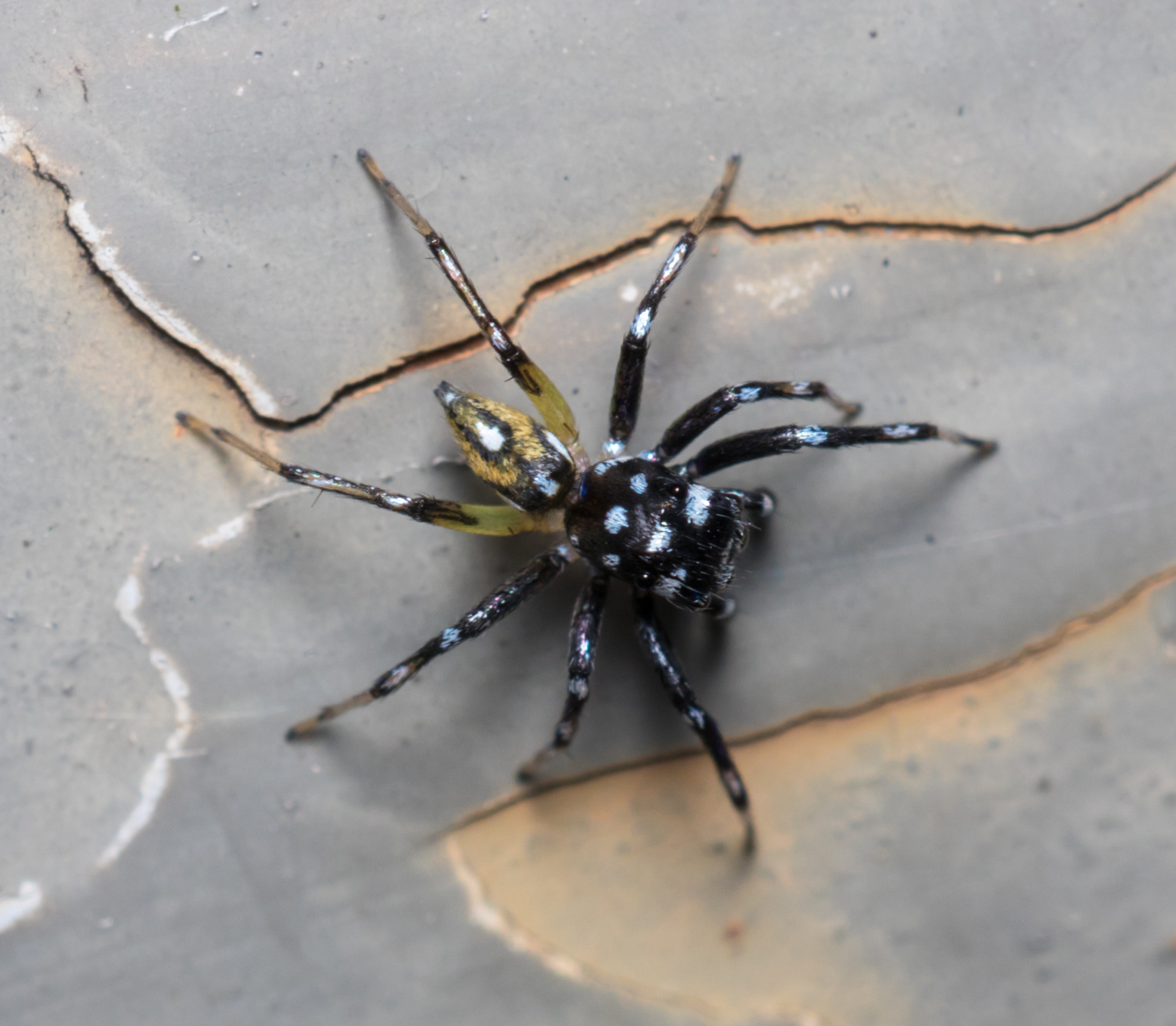
- male from Hong Kong

Scientific classification
- Kingdom: Animalia
- Phylum: Arthropoda
- Subphylum: Chelicerata
- Class: Arachnida
- Order: Araneae
- Infraorder: Araneomorphae
- Family: Salticidae
- Genus: Phintella
- Species: P. bifurcilinea

Binomial name
- Phintella bifurcilinea (Bösenberg & Strand, 1906)

Synonyms
- Telamonia bifurcilinea Bösenberg & Strand, 1906; Ictidops pupus Karsch, 1879; Aelurillus pupus (Karsch, 1879); Phintella typica Strand, 1906; Hasarius crucifer Dönitz & Strand, 1906; Icius pupus (Karsch, 1879)

= Phintella bifurcilinea =

Species of spider

Phintella bifurcilinea is a species of jumping spider in the genus Phintella. Originally described by Bösenberg and Strand in 1906 as Telamonia bifurcilinea, it was transferred to the genus Phintella by Prószyński in 1983.

== Taxonomy ==
Ph. bifurcilinea has a complex taxonomic history involving multiple synonymizations. The species was originally described by Bösenberg and Strand in 1906 as Telamonia bifurcilinea. An earlier name, Ictidops pupus Karsch, 1879, was later recognized as a senior synonym but had been overlooked (nomen oblitum). Prószyński transferred the species to Phintella in 1983 and synonymized several related taxa, establishing the current taxonomic status.

== Distribution ==
Ph. bifurcilinea is widely distributed across East Asia, with records from Korea, Japan, China, and Vietnam. The species was originally collected from Saga and the Yunohama mountains in Japan.

== Description ==
The species shows considerable sexual dimorphism, with females measuring approximately 5 mm in total length compared to 4 mm for males.

=== Female ===
The female has a relatively small, narrow cephalothorax with the head region dark brown to blackish-brown, marked with a broad white transverse band in front of the last pair of eyes. The thoracic region is dark brown with small white markings and a white-bordered margin. The sternum is blackish-brown or brownish-gray. The chelicerae are yellow with dark brown wedge-shaped markings covering most of the front surface. The maxillae are blackish on the outer side but yellow on the front and inner edges. The palpi are pure white, and the legs are yellowish-white with only the upper surface of the fourth coxae being black.

The abdomen displays striking white markings on a dark brown to blackish-brown background. The ventral surface has blackish-brown sides with yellowish point stripes, and two broad grayish-white longitudinal stripes running down the middle that enclose a somewhat broader brown stripe. The epigyne is reddish-brown, and the spinnerets are blackish-gray with the upper ones being longer, thinner, and darker than the lower ones.

=== Male ===
In males, the white stripe in front of the last pair of eyes may be absent or barely indicated. The palpi are long and slender, with typically the first two and last segments being blackish-brown, while the patella and tibia are white with blackish tinting on the sides. The tibia has a short, pointed process on the outer side. The first pair of femora are blackish-brown while all other leg segments are yellow, though the patellae and tibiae of all legs, as well as femora II-IV, are more or less black-striped or spotted on the sides.

Males have a distinctively larger cephalothorax relative to their smaller overall size, with a much smaller abdomen than females. The chelicerae are shorter than in females, sharply curved outward, and strongly divergent.

=== Color variation ===
The species exhibits remarkable color changes with age. Young specimens display blue iridescent scales that may show reddish shimmer, while in adults these scales transition to yellow, green, and red colors. As the scales become sparser with age, more of the underlying black body surface becomes visible, making older specimens appear much darker.
