= Phintella multimaculata =

Scientific classification
- Kingdom: Animalia
- Phylum: Arthropoda
- Subphylum: Chelicerata
- Class: Arachnida
- Order: Araneae
- Infraorder: Araneomorphae
- Family: Salticidae
- Genus: Phintella
- Species: P. multimaculata

Binomial name
- Phintella multimaculata (Simon, 1901)

Synonyms
- Chrysilla multimaculata Simon, 1901

Species of spider

Phintella multimaculata is a species of spider of the genus Phintella. It is endemic to Sri Lanka.
