= Phintella bella =

Scientific classification
- Kingdom: Animalia
- Phylum: Arthropoda
- Subphylum: Chelicerata
- Class: Arachnida
- Order: Araneae
- Infraorder: Araneomorphae
- Family: Salticidae
- Genus: Phintella
- Species: P. bella

Binomial name
- Phintella bella Wiśniewski & Wesołowska, 2024

Species of spider

Phintella bella is a species of jumping spider in the genus Phintella that lives in Uganda. It was first described in 2024.
