= Phintella abnormis =

Scientific classification
- Kingdom: Animalia
- Phylum: Arthropoda
- Subphylum: Chelicerata
- Class: Arachnida
- Order: Araneae
- Infraorder: Araneomorphae
- Family: Salticidae
- Genus: Phintella
- Species: P. abnormis

Binomial name
- Phintella abnormis (Boes. et Str., 1906)

Synonyms
- Icius abnormis Bösenberg et Strand, 1906; Jotus abnormis Bösenberg & Strand, 1906(original combination)

Species of spider

Phintella abnormis is a spider species of the family Salticidae (jumping spiders).

== Distribution ==
This species is seen in Primorsky Krai (written as primore in original text) of Russia, Korean Peninsula, Japan,, Mainland China and Taiwan.。

The type locality of the species is in Japan.
