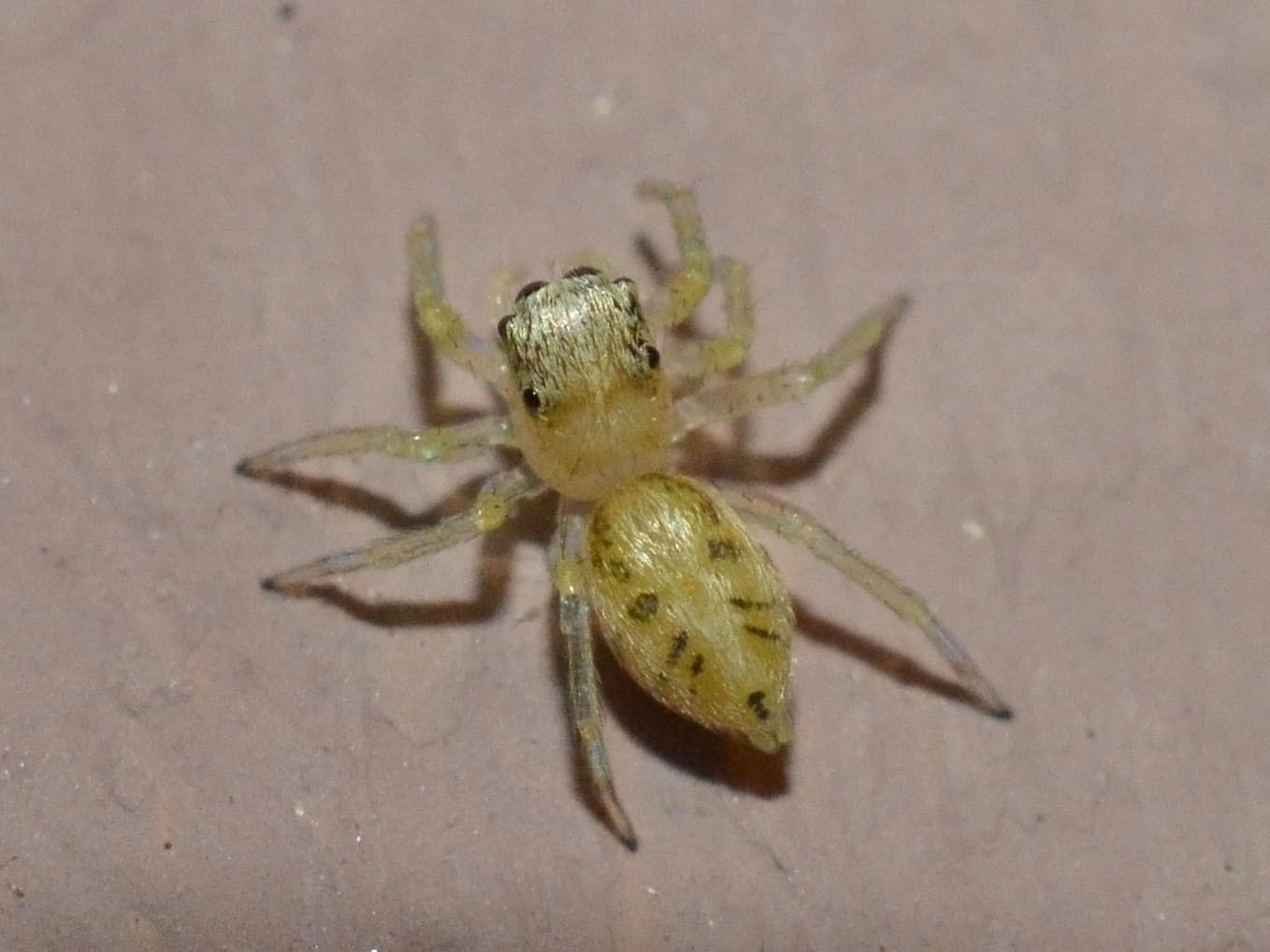
- juvenile female from Bulgaria
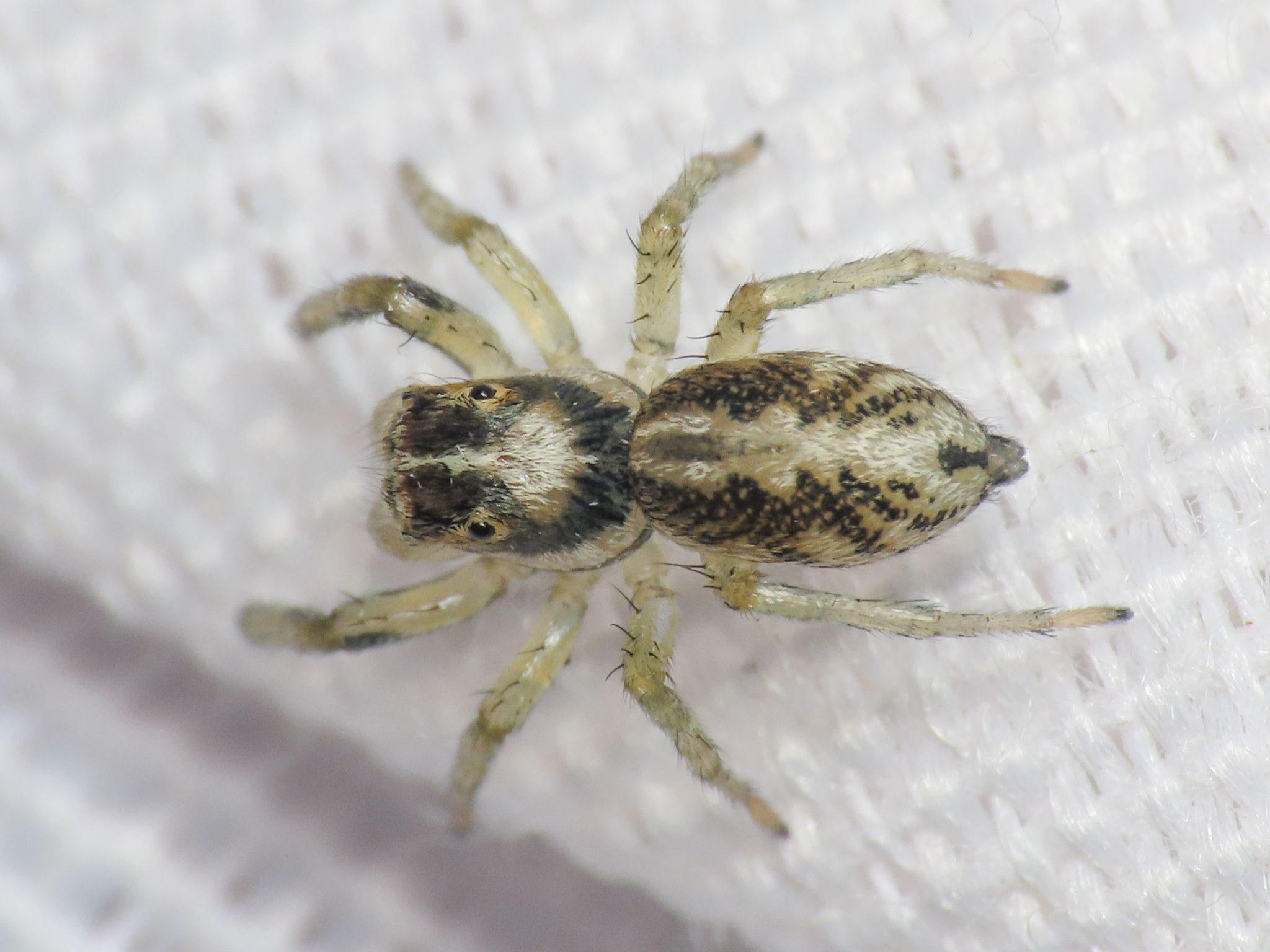
- juvenile male from Italy

Scientific classification
- Kingdom: Animalia
- Phylum: Arthropoda
- Subphylum: Chelicerata
- Class: Arachnida
- Order: Araneae
- Infraorder: Araneomorphae
- Family: Salticidae
- Genus: Phintella
- Species: P. castriesiana

Binomial name
- Phintella castriesiana (Grube, 1862)

Synonyms
- Attus castriesianus Grube, 1861; Attus multipunctatus Simon, 1868; Attus scriptus Simon, 1868; Salticus blandus Blackwall, 1870; Saitis sanctae-eufemiae Kolosváry, 1938; Euophrys aninotatus Bösenberg & Strand, 1906

= Phintella castriesiana =

Species of spider

Phintella castriesiana is a species of jumping spider in the genus Phintella. It has a wide distribution across the Palearctic region, ranging from the Canary Islands in the west to Japan in the east.

== Etymology ==
The species name castriesiana refers to "Castries" (now De-Kastri in Khabarovsk Krai, Russia), where the original specimen was collected by Leopold von Schrenck during his expeditions to the Russian Far East in the 1850s. The bay was named after Charles Eugène Gabriel de La Croix.

== Taxonomy ==
The species was originally described by Adolf Eduard Grube in 1861 as Attus castriesianus based on specimens collected in the Amur River valley in the Russian Far East.

The species has had a complex taxonomic history and was transferred to the genus Phintella by Jerzy Prószyński in 1983. Since the original holotype was incomplete, a neotype was designated by Logunov and Wesołowska in 1992 from specimens collected in the Bolshekhekhtsirskii Nature Reserve in Khabarovsk Krai, Russia.

== Distribution ==
P. castriesiana has been recorded from the Canary Islands, southern Europe, North Africa, the Middle East, Turkey, the Caucasus, Iran, the Russian Far East, Korea, and Japan.

== Habitat ==
The species has been collected in mixed forests on grass vegetation.

== Description ==
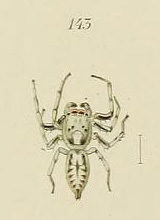
Drawing of male (Bösenberg & Strand 1906)

Phintella castriesiana is the largest and darkest species of Phintella found in the Russian Far East. Males have a body length of approximately 4.6 mm, while females reach 4.9 mm.

The male has a yellowish-brown cephalothorax with black veins and eyes surrounded by black rings. White scales are present in the vicinity of the eyes. The sternum, labium and maxillae are yellow, while the chelicerae are brownish. The opisthosoma is yellow with a dark grey pattern on the dorsal surface and light ventrally with a dark longitudinal streak. The legs are yellow with brown longitudinal stripes on the femora of legs I-III and brown dots on the proximal and distal parts of the tibiae of legs I-II.

Females have similar coloration to males but are slightly paler, with all legs being uniformly yellow.
