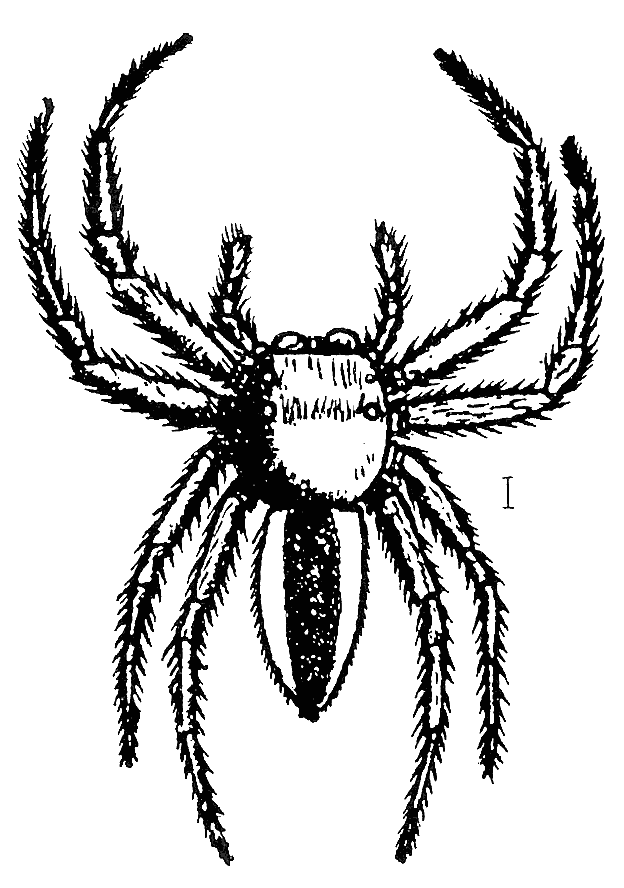
- The related male Phintella versicolor

Scientific classification
- Kingdom: Animalia
- Phylum: Arthropoda
- Subphylum: Chelicerata
- Class: Arachnida
- Order: Araneae
- Infraorder: Araneomorphae
- Family: Salticidae
- Genus: Phintella
- Species: P. lucida

Binomial name
- Phintella lucida Wesołowska & Tomasiewicz, 2008

= Phintella lucida =

Species of spider

Phintella lucida is a species of jumping spider in the genus Phintella that lives in Ethiopia and Kenya. The female of the species was first described in 2008 by Wanda Wesołowska and Beata Tomasiewicz and the male by Angelika Dawidowicz and Wesołowska in 2016. The spider is large for the genus, and the female larger than the male with an abdomen that is up to 3.2 mm (0.13 in) in length. It is yellow, with brown spots on the abdomen, the lighter colour recognised in the name of the species, which recalls the Latin word for light.

== Taxonomy ==
Phintella lucida is a jumping spider that was first identified in 2008 by Wanda Wesołowska and Beata Tomasiewicz. It is one of over 500 species identified by Wesołowska during her career. The species name is derived from the Latin word for light. It was placed in the genus Phintella, first raised in 1906 by Embrik Strand and W. Bösenberg. The genus name derives from the genus Phintia, which it resembles. The genus Phintia was itself renamed Phintodes, which was subsequently absorbed into Tylogonus. There are similarities between spiders within genus Phintella and those in Chira, Chrysilla, Euophrys, Icius, Jotus and Telamonia. Genetic analysis confirms that it is related to the genera Helvetia and Menemerus and is classified in the tribe Chrysillini.

== Description ==
The spider was initially described based on a female specimen found by Anthony Russell-Smith between 1982 and 1988. The male was first identified by Angelika Dawidowicz and Wanda Wesołowska in 2016 based on the collection of the Swedish arachnologist Åke Holm. The species is distinguished by its lighter colouring, which is recalled in its species name, and larger size. Otherwise, it resembles Phintella debilis, which is found in Asia. The spider has a very light brown thorax and the area around the eyes in yellow. The clypeus is similarly yellow. The abdomen is oval and yellow with a pattern of brown spots. The female is slightly lighter than the male. The male has an abdomen that is between 1.6 and 2.1 mm (0.063 and 0.083 in) long. The female is larger, between 1.9 and 3.2 mm (0.075 and 0.126 in) long. The cephalothorax is similar in size to the abdomen, measuring between 1.6 and 2.2 mm (0.063 and 0.087 in) in length. The male has hairy pedipalps and a very short embolus. The female has an epigyne with a notch on the end.

== Distribution and habitat ==
Phintella lucida was first found in the Shoa Province of Ethiopia, in a Eucalyptus swamp. It was subsequently identified from examples discovered in the Tsavo West National Park and on the slopes of Mount Elgon in Kenya.
