= Tylogonus =

Scientific classification
- Kingdom: Animalia
- Phylum: Arthropoda
- Subphylum: Chelicerata
- Class: Arachnida
- Order: Araneae
- Infraorder: Araneomorphae
- Family: Salticidae
- Subfamily: Salticinae
- Genus: Tylogonus; Simon, 1902

Type species
- T. auricapillus Simon, 1902

Species
- 11, see text

Synonyms
- Phintodes Strand, 1934

Genus of spiders

Tylogonus is a genus of jumping spiders that was first described by Eugène Louis Simon in 1902. It is considered a senior synonym of Phintodes.

== Species ==
As of August 2019 it contains eleven species, found in Brazil, Colombia, Venezuela, Ecuador, and Panama:

- Tylogonus auricapillus Simon, 1902 (type) – Ecuador
- Tylogonus chiriqui Galiano, 1994 – Panama
- Tylogonus miles Simon, 1903 – Venezuela
- Tylogonus parabolicus Galiano, 1985 – Colombia
- Tylogonus parvus Zhang & Maddison, 2012 – Ecuador
- Tylogonus pichincha Galiano, 1985 – Ecuador
- Tylogonus prasinus Simon, 1902 – Brazil
- Tylogonus putumayo Galiano, 1985 – Colombia
- Tylogonus vachoni Galiano, 1960 – Brazil
- Tylogonus viridimicans (Simon, 1901) – Ecuador
- Tylogonus yanayacu Zhang & Maddison, 2012 – Ecuador
