= Pristobaeus vanuaensis =

Scientific classification
- Kingdom: Animalia
- Phylum: Arthropoda
- Subphylum: Chelicerata
- Class: Arachnida
- Order: Araneae
- Infraorder: Araneomorphae
- Family: Salticidae
- Genus: Pristobaeus
- Species: P. vanuaensis

Binomial name
- Pristobaeus vanuaensis (Patoleta, 2008)

Species of jumping spider

Pristobaeus vanuaensis is a jumping spider species that lives on Fiji. It was first found on the island of Vanua Levu, after which it is named. First described in 2008 by the arachnologist Barbara Maria Patoleta, the spider is medium-sized, measuring typically 5.7 mm (0.22 in) in body length. Its upper surfaces are darker than it is underneath. On top, it has a grey-brown hard forward section, or carapace, that has a darker eye field and black areas around its eyes while, behind its carapace, its abdomen has a light leaf-like pattern on its grey-brown background. Underneath, its front section includes a pale yellow sternum while its abdomen is white apart from a marking of grey spots. Its legs are light brown and covered in leg spines. The spider's copulatory organs help to distinguish the spider from others in the genus, particularly the length of the female's rounded insemination ducts and the size of its spermathecae at their ends. The male has not been described.

== Etymology and taxonomy ==
Pristobaeus vanuaensis is a species of jumping spider, a member of the family Salticidae, that was first described by the arachnologist Barbara Maria Patoleta in 2008. Its specific name is related to the place where it was first found. She originally allocated it to the genus Palpelius, which had been first cicumscribed by the naturalist Eugène Simon in 1903. In 2015, the evolutionary biologists Junxia Zhang and Wayne Maddison transferred it to the genus Pristobaeus based on its features, including its body form, coloration and the structure of its copulatory organs. Pristobaeus had been first cicumscribed by Simon in 1902.

In 2015, Zhang and Maddison designated the genus part of a clade named Pristobaeus alongside the genera Opisthoncana, Ergane and Ascyltus. A phylogenetic classification showed that it is a member of the tribe Euophryini. This is a very cosmopolitan tribe It is a member of the subclade Simonida in the clade Saltafresia. In 2017, the arachnologist Jerzy Prószyński added the genus to a group of genera named Euophryines. The holotype is stored in the Queensland Museum.

== Description ==
Pristobaeus vanuaensis is a medium-sized spider that has distinctive characteristics. It has a body that is divided into two main parts: a forward section, known as its cephalothorax, and, behind that, an abdomen. The male has a cephalothorax that is typically 2.8 mm (0.11 in) long, 2.2 mm (0.09 in) wide and 1.3 mm (0.05 in) high. Its carapace, the hard upper side of its cephalothorax, is grey-brown apart from its eye field, which is brown, and black areas surrounding its eyes. There is also a lighter leaf-like belt circling its sloping rear and a distinctive depression, or fovea, in the middle of its carapace. It has greu-brown sides while the part of the underside of its cephalothorax known as is sternum is a pale yellow oval. The section of the spider's face known as its clypeus,is low, light brown and slightly hairy. There are two teeth at the front and one conical tooth at the back of its light brown chelicerae. Its remaining mouthparts, its labium and maxillae, are light brown with yellow tips.

The male's abdomen measures typically 2.9 mm (0.11 in) long and 1.8 mm (0.07 in) wide. It is grey-brown on top with a large lighter leaf-like pattern in the middle. Underneath, it is whitish and marked with grey spots. There are white tips at the end of the greyish spinnerets that it uses to spin webs. Its legs are light brown with a few dark sections and many leg spines.

The spider's copulatory organs are distinctive and the best way to distinguish the species from others in the genus. The female has a rounded epigyne, the visible external part of its copulatory organs, which has two copulatory openings at the rear found in windows. These lead, via insemination ducts, to two-stage spermathecae, or receptacles. Compared to the related Pristobaeus namosi and Pristobaeus vitiensis, the spider's insemination ducts are longer and the second chambers of its spermathecae are larger. The male has not been described.

== Distribution ==
Pristobaeus spiders have been identified across the Pacific Islands. Pristobaeus vanuaensis was first seen on the island of Vanua Levu in Fiji where it has been found living at altitudes of about 700 m (2,300 ft) above sea level.

=== Bibliography ===
- Berry, James W.; Beatty, Joseph A.; Proszynski, Jerzy (1998). "Salticidae of the Pacific Islands. III. Distribution of Seven Genera, with Description of Nineteen New Species and Two New Genera" (PDF). Journal of Arachnology. 26 (2): 149–189.
- Maddison, Wayne P. (2015). "A phylogenetic classification of jumping spiders (Araneae: Salticidae)". The Journal of Arachnology. 43 (3): 231–292. doi:10.1636/arac-43-03-231-292. S2CID 85680279.
- Maddison, Wayne P.; Li, Daiqin; Bodner, Melissa; Zhang, Junxia; Xu, Xin; Liu, Qingqing; Liu, Fengxiang (2014). "The deep phylogeny of jumping spiders (Araneae, Salticidae)". ZooKeys (440): 57–87. doi:10.3897/zookeys.440.7891. PMC 4195940. PMID 25317062.
- Patoleta, Barbara (2008). "Description of new species of Palpelius Simon, 1903 from Fiji archipelago (Araneae: Salticidae)". Genus. 19 (4): 721–727.
- Prószyński, Jerzy (2017). "Pragmatic classification of the World's Salticidae (Araneae)". Ecologica Montenegrina. 12: 1–133. doi:10.37828/em.2017.12.1.
- Zhang, Junxia; Maddison, Wayne P. (2015). "Genera of euophryine jumping spiders (Araneae: Salticidae), with a combined molecular-morphological phylogeny". Zootaxa. 3938 (1): 1–147. doi:10.11646/zootaxa.3938.1.1.
