= Xenocytaea taveuniensis =

Scientific classification
- Kingdom: Animalia
- Phylum: Arthropoda
- Subphylum: Chelicerata
- Class: Arachnida
- Order: Araneae
- Infraorder: Araneomorphae
- Family: Salticidae
- Genus: Xenocytaea
- Species: X. taveuniensis

Binomial name
- Xenocytaea taveuniensis Patoleta, 2011

Species of jumping spider

Xenocytaea taveuniensis is a jumping spider species that lives on Fiji. First described in 2011, the spider is large, measuring between 3.52 and 4 mm (0.14 and 0.16 in) in body length, the female being larger than the male. It is generally brown with yellow sections apart from the top side of its abdomen, which is gray-yellow and has a distinctive pattern of rows of light brown patches. There are two teeth at the front and one tooth with two cusps at the back of the spider's brown chelicerae. Both the male and female have whitish legs. The spider's copulatory organs help to distinguish the spider from others in the genus, particularly the lack of arches covering the female's copulatory openings and the blunt projections, or apophyses, on the male's palpal tibia. It was first found on the island of Taveuni, after which it is named.

== Etymology and taxonomy ==
Xenocytaea taveuniensis is a species of jumping spider, a member of the family Salticidae, that was first described by the arachnologist Patoleta in 2011. She allocated it to the genus Xenocytaea, which had been first cicumscribed by James W. Berry, Joseph A. Beatty and Jerzy Proszynski in 1998. The name of the genus is a combination of the Greek word xeno, which can be translated 'strange' and the genus name Cytaea, which denotes that, despite it being similar, it does not belong to that genus. Its specific name is related to the place where it was first found. The holotype is stored in the Queensland Museum.

In 2015, the evolutionary biologist Wayne Maddison undertook a phylogenetic classification that it is a member of the tribe Euophryini. Previously also known as Cytaeae and Cytaeinae, this is a very cosmopolitan tribe It is a member of the subclade Simonida in the clade Saltafresia. In 2017, the arachnologist Jerzy Prószyński added the genus to a group of genera named Euophryines.

== Description ==
Xenocytaea taveuniensis has distinctive characteristics with a body that is divided into two main parts: a forward section, known as its cephalothorax, and, behind that, an abdomen. The male has a brown cephalothorax that is typically 1.96 mm (0.08 in) long, 1.32 mm (0.05 in) wide and 1.08 mm (0.04 in) high. It has lateral stripes made of white scales on its upper surface while there are dark brown areas around its eyes. It has light brown sides while the part of the underside of its cephalothorax known as is sternum is yellow as is the section of the spider's face known as the clypeus. There are two teeth at the front and one tooth with two cusps at the back of its brown chelicerae. Its labium is gray-yellow and is more than twice the length of its yellow maxillae.

The male's abdomen measures typically 1.56 mm (0.06 in) long and 1.26 mm (0.05 in) wide. It is gray-yellow with two rows of dark brown patches on the top and plain whitish underneath. It has light brown spinnerets that are used to spin webs. Its legs are whitish with dark patches and leg spines visible on all of them.

At the end of its pedipalp is the male's spider's copulatory organs. Its palpal tibia has a tuft of hairs visible on its side and has a blunt projection, or tibial apophyses, has two rounded ends. Attached to the top of the palpal tibia is the spider's pear-shaped cymbium, which is hairy and is attached to a smaller rounded palpal bulb that consists of a rounded tegulum and a thin embolus starts towards the middle of the bulb, circles round and then projects upwards, ending up beyond the boundary of the cambium and parallel to its hairy exterior. It lacks the hooked tibial apophyses that seen on the related Xenocytaea maddisoni but otherwise has similar copulatory organs.

The female is slightly larger than the male, with a similarly light brown cephalothorax that is typically 1.95 mm (0.08 in) long, 1.55 mm (0.06 in) wide and 1.15 mm (0.05 in) high. It is covered in white scales and a dark brown eye field. Its sternum is yellow like the male as are its maxillae. Its labium is brown and its chelicerae have two teeth at the front and a single tooth with two cusps like the male. Its abdomen is typically 2.05 mm (0.08 in) long and 1.65 mm (0.06 in) wide. It is gray-yellow on top with a light stripe and a pattern of dark spots on its surface. It is whitish underneath. Its spinnerets are brown and its legs are light brown.

The female's epigyne, the external visible part of its copulatory organs, is rounded with a deep pocket towards the back. It lacks the arches that are common in other species in the genus; instead, its copulatory openings are exposed. They lead to long S-shaped insemination ducts, which are similar to Xenocytaea victoriensis but wider. They lead to spermathecae, or receptacles, that are duct-like at the start and globular at the end. Its has noticeable accessory glands that extend from its spermathecae towards the back of its epigene.

== Distribution ==
Xenocytaea spiders have been identified across the Pacific Islands. Xenocytaea taveuniensis was first found on the island of Taveuni in Fiji
