= Rhondes sarasini =

Scientific classification
- Kingdom: Animalia
- Phylum: Arthropoda
- Subphylum: Chelicerata
- Class: Arachnida
- Order: Araneae
- Infraorder: Araneomorphae
- Family: Salticidae
- Genus: Rhondes
- Species: R. sarasini

Binomial name
- Rhondes sarasini Patoleta, 2016

Species of spider

Rhondes sarasini is an endemic species of jumping spider in the genus Rhondes that lives in New Caledonia. First described in 2016 by Barbara Patoleta, only the female has yet to be identified. The holotype was discovered by Jean Roux and Karl Friedrich Sarasin in 1911, and the species name commemorates the latter. It is a small and slender spider, with a wide light brown cephalothorax that is typically 3.2 mm (0.13 in) long and a thinner abdomen, typically 5 mm (0.20 in) long, that has a pattern of light and dark patches. It differs from other members of the genus in its design of the epigyne, which has a wide pocket and short copulatory openings.

== Taxonomy ==
Rhondes sarasini was first identified in 2016 by Barbara Patoleta. The female holotype had been collected in 1911 by Jean Roux and Karl Friedrich Sarasin, and it is the latter that is commemorated in the species name. The genus Rhondes was raised in 1901 by Eugène Simon for endemic species of jumping spiders in New Caledonia. It has been placed in the tribe Viciriini in the clade Astioida. Genetic analysis confirms that it is related to other species found only on the island, including members of the genus Penionomus, and not as closely related to members of the genus Heliophanus and others of the Chrysillini tribe, as was originally suggested. The fact that the species on the island are both closely related to each other and genetically distinct from those found off the island is used as evidence of the evolution taking place after the breakup of Gondwana.

== Description ==
The spider is one of five members of the genus described by Patoleta in 2016. Only the female has been identified. Small and slender, it has a shape that is typical of the genus, with a wide cephalothorax, thinner abdomen, very large chelicerae and very long endites. The cephalothorax is light brown, with a covering of white scales, which measures 3.2 mm (0.13 in) long and 2.7 mm (0.11 in) wide. The abdomen is grey-brown and hairy with light and dark patches on top and grey-brown underneath. It typically measures 5 mm (0.20 in) long and 2.7 mm (0.11 in) wide. The clypeus is very narrow and light brown with long white hairs. The chelicerae, endites and pedipalps are similarly light brown. The front legs are dark brown, the remainder a lighter brown. The epigyne has short copulatory openings unlike Rhondes atypicus but a similarly shallow and wide pocket. This distinguishes it from other species in the genus, such as Rhondes flexibilis, which has a wide pocket.

== Distribution and habitat ==
Rhondes sarasini has only been found in one location, in the forests of Vallie Ngoué towards the south end of Grande Terre, New Caledonia. Despite the existence of similar environments on other islands across the Pacific Ocean, it is endemic to the island and there is no evidence of the species in any other locale.
