= Rhondes zofiae =

Scientific classification
- Kingdom: Animalia
- Phylum: Arthropoda
- Subphylum: Chelicerata
- Class: Arachnida
- Order: Araneae
- Infraorder: Araneomorphae
- Family: Salticidae
- Genus: Rhondes
- Species: R. zofiae

Binomial name
- Rhondes zofiae Patoleta, 2016

Species of spider

Rhondes zofiae is an endemic species of jumping spider in the genus Rhondes that lives in New Caledonia. Only the female has been described. First defined in 2016 by Barbara Patoleta, the species is unusually named after her mother. It is small and slender, with a wide light brown cephalothorax and thinner abdomen that is lighter and patterned with grey-brown patches. It can be distinguished from the related Rhondes atypicus by the position of its copulatory openings.

== Taxonomy ==
Rhondes zofiae was first identified in 2016 by Barbara Patoleta. The species was named after Patoleta's mother, Zofia Jendrzejewska. This is unusual, as naming species after members of a scientist's family is uncommon, and, when species are named after people, male choices far outnumber female names. The genus Rhondes was raised in 1901 by Eugène Simon for endemic species of jumping spiders in New Caledonia. It has been placed in the tribe Viciriini in the clade Astioida. Genetic analysis confirms that it is related to other species found only on the island, including members of the genus Penionomus, and not as closely related to members of the genus Heliophanus, and others of the Chrysillini tribe, as was originally suggested. The fact that the species on the island are both closely related to each other and genetically distinct from those found off the island is used as evidence of the evolution taking place after the breakup of Gondwana.

== Description ==
The spider is one of five members of the genus described by Patoleta in 2016. Only the female has been identified. Small and slender, it has a shape that is typical of the genus, with a wide cephalothorax, thinner abdomen, very large chelicerae and very long endites. The cephalothorax is light brown, with a covering of white scales, and measures 2.51 mm (0.099 in) long and 1.97 mm (0.078 in) wide. The clypeus is very narrow with long pale hairs. The abdomen is lighter, almost white, with a pattern of grey-brown patches. It measures 3 mm (0.12 in) long and 1.37 mm (0.054 in) wide. The chelicerae, legs and pedipalps are also shades of brown. Although the epigyne has a wide pocket similar to the related Rhondes atypicus, its copulatory openings are closer together. This also distinguishes it from other species in the genus, such as Rhondes flexibilis, which has a narrow pocket.

== Distribution and habitat ==
Rhondes zofiae was first identified from a female holotype found around Bois du Sud on Grande Terre, New Caledonia. It had been collected in 2004 in a forested area. It is only found in the south of the island. Despite the existence of similar environments on other islands across the Pacific Ocean, there is no evidence of the species in any other locale, and so it is endemic to New Caledonia.
