= Pristobaeus taveuniensis =

Scientific classification
- Kingdom: Animalia
- Phylum: Arthropoda
- Subphylum: Chelicerata
- Class: Arachnida
- Order: Araneae
- Infraorder: Araneomorphae
- Family: Salticidae
- Genus: Pristobaeus
- Species: P. taveuniensis

Binomial name
- Pristobaeus taveuniensis (Patoleta, 2008)

Species of jumping spider

Pristobaeus taveuniensis is a jumping spider species that lives on Fiji. It was first found on the island of Taveuni, after which it is named. First described in 2008, the spider is medium-sized, measuring typically 4.06 mm (0.16 in) in body length. Its upper surfaces are darker than it is underneath. On top, it has a brown forward section, or carapace, that has a darker eye field and black areas around its eyes while its abdomen has a pattern of wavy lines that make up a light stripe on a grey-brown background. Underneath, its front section is includes a pale yellow sternum while its abdomen is whitish apart from a marking of grey spots. There are three pronounced fine hairs protruding from the section of the spider's face known as its clypeus and its legs are brown. The spider's copulatory organs help to distinguish the spider from others in the genus, particularly the male's rounded tegulum, which is narrower than that found on the related Pristobaeus namosi. The female has not been described.

== Etymology and taxonomy ==
Pristobaeus taveuniensis is a species of jumping spider, a member of the family Salticidae, that was first described by the arachnologist Patoleta in 2008. Its specific name is related to the place where it was first found. She originally allocated it to the genus Palpelius, which had been first cicumscribed by the naturalist Eugène Simon in 1903. In 2015, the evolutionary biologists Junxia Zhang and Wayne Maddison transferred it to the genus Pristobaeus based on its features, including its body form, coloration and the structure of its copulatory organs. The holotype is stored in the Queensland Museum.

In 2015, Zhang and Maddison designated the genus part of a clade named Pristobaeus alongside the genera Opisthoncana, Ergane and Ascyltus. A phylogenetic classification showed that it is a member of the tribe Euophryini. This is a very cosmopolitan tribe It is a member of the subclade Simonida in the clade Saltafresia. In 2017, the arachnologist Jerzy Prószyński added the genus to a group of genera named Euophryines.

== Description ==
Pristobaeus taveuniensis is a medium-sized spider that has distinctive characteristics. It has a body that is divided into two main parts: a forward section, known as its cephalothorax, and, behind that, an abdomen. The male has a cephalothorax that is typically 2.07 mm (0.08 in) long, 1.65 mm (0.06 in) wide and 1.27 mm (0.05 in) high. Its carapace, the hard upper side of its cephalothorax, is brown apart from its eye field, which is dark brown, and black areas surrounding its eyes. There are also grey scales around its eyes and a lighter leaf-like belt circling its sloping rear. There is a distinctive depression, or fovea, in the middle of its carapace. It has brown sides while the part of the underside of its cephalothorax known as is sternum is a pale yellow oval. There are three pronounced fine hairs protruding from the section of the spider's face known as its clypeus, which is low, brown and slightly hairy. There are two teeth at the front and one tooth at the back of its brown chelicerae. Its remaining mouthparts, its labium and maxillae, are light brown with yellow tips.

The male's abdomen measures typically 1.99 mm (0.08 in) long and 1.14 mm (0.04 in) wide. It is grey-brown on top with a lighter stripe running down the middle consists of a series of relatively large concentric wave-like patterns. Underneath, it is whitish and marked with grey spots. There are whitish tips at the end of the greyish spinnerets that it uses to spin webs. Its legs are brown and have many leg spines.

At the end of its pedipalp is the male's spider's copulatory organs. These are distinctive and the best way to distinguish the species from others in the genus. Its palpal patella and tibia are whitish with tufts of hairs visible on the side of its tibia, which has, at its end, a long thin slightly curved projection, or tibial apophyses, that has a blunted end. Attached to the top of the palpal tibia is the spider's hairy cymbium that curves around a smaller bulbous palpal bulb. The bulb consists of a rounded tegulum, which has a bulge at the bottom, and a embolus starts at the top of the bulb, circles round and then projects upwards. Its tegulum is narrower than the one found on the related Pristobaeus namosi and its palpal tibia is shorter than that of Pristobaeus beccari. The female has not been described.

== Distribution ==
Pristobaeus spiders have been identified across the Pacific Islands. Pristobaeus taveuniensis was first seen on the island of Taveuni in Fiji where it has been found living at altitudes of between 900 and 1,100 m (3,000 and 3,600 ft) above sea level.
