= Xenocytaea stanislawi =

Scientific classification
- Kingdom: Animalia
- Phylum: Arthropoda
- Subphylum: Chelicerata
- Class: Arachnida
- Order: Araneae
- Infraorder: Araneomorphae
- Family: Salticidae
- Genus: Xenocytaea
- Species: X. stanislawi

Binomial name
- Xenocytaea stanislawi Patoleta, 2011

Species of jumping spider

Xenocytaea stanislawi is a jumping spider species that lives on the island of Viti Levu in Fiji. First described in 2011, the spider is large, measuring between 3.68 and 3.97 mm (0.14 and 0.16 in) in body length, the female being larger than the male. It is generally dark brown with light brown sections apart from the top side of its abdomen, which is whitish and has a distinctive pattern of light brown patches, including a large patches at the front, another on top and four patches on each side. The female has a single fine hair on the section of the spider's face known as the clypeus. Both the male and female have yellowish legs. The spider's copulatory organs help to distinguish the spider from others in the genus. Compared to the related Xenocytaea triramosa, the female's insemination ducts are longer and the male's hairy cymbium is wider and has a distinctive flat tip.

== Etymology and taxonomy ==
Xenocytaea stanislawi is a species of jumping spider, a member of the family Salticidae, that was first described by the arachnologist Patoleta in 2011. She allocated it to the genus Xenocytaea, which had been first cicumscribed by ames W. Berry, Joseph A. Beatty and Jerzy Proszynski in 1998. The genus name is a combination of the Greek word xeno, which can be translated 'strange' and the genus name Cytaea, which denotes that, despite it being similar, it does not belong to that genus. Its specific name recalled Patoleta's father, Stanisław Jendrzejewski. The holotype is stored in the Queensland Museum.

In 2015, the evolutionary biologist Wayne Maddison undertook a phylogenetic classification that it is a member of the tribe Euophryini. Previously also known as Cytaeae and Cytaeinae, this is a very cosmopolitan tribe It is a member of the subclade Simonida in the clade Saltafresia. In 2017, the arachnologist Jerzy Prószyński added the genus to a group of genera named Euophryines'.

== Description ==
A large slender spider, Xenocytaea stanislawi is similar to its relative, Xenocytaea triramosa, but has distinctive characteristics. Its body is divided into two main parts: a forward section, known as its cephalothorax, and, behind that, an abdomen. The male has a brown cephalothorax that is typically 1.99 mm (0.08 in) long, 1.52 mm (0.06 in) wide and 1.12 mm (0.04 in) high. It is covered in many white scales on its upper surface while there are dark brown areas around its eyes. The part of the underside of its cephalothorax known as is sternum is light brown. The section of the spider's face known as the clypeus is brown with a covering of grey hairs. There are two teeth at the front and one tooth with two cusps at the back of its chelicerae. Its remaining mouthparts, including its labium and maxillae, are light brown, its labium also being twice as long as its maxillae.

The male's whitish abdomen measures typically 1.69 mm (0.07 in) long and 1.26 mm (0.05 in) wide. There is a pattern of light brown patches, with two larger patches towards the front and middle of the topside, two much smaller patches towards the rear and four patches on each side. There are no patches on the underside. It has light brown spinnerets that are used to spin webs. Its legs are yellowish and slender with leg spines visible on all of them.

At the end of its pedipalp is the male's spider's copulatory organs. Its palpal tibia is short and covered in long brown and white hairs. This tibia has a distinctive set of appendages called tibial apophyses made up of a pair of blunt protrusions and, above them, a sharp spike that projects upwards towards the spider's cymbium. Its cambium is also hairy and is attached to a smaller rounded palpal bulb that consists of a rhomboid tegulum and a thin embolus starts towards the middle of the bulb, circles round and then projects upwards, ending up beyond the boundary of the cambium and parallel to its hairy exterior. Compared to the related Xenocytaea triramosa, its tibial apophyses are longer and its cymbium is shorter and wider with a distinctive flat tip.

The female is slightly larger than the male, with a similarly light brown cephalothorax that is typically 2.09 mm (0.08 in) long, 1.56 mm (0.06 in) wide and 1.3 mm (0.05 in) high. While the male's carapace is without a pattern, the female's has patches on the sides. Its eye field is dark brown and its clypeus is brown with a single fine hair visible on its surface. Its sternum is light brown like the male as are its labium and maxillae. Its abdomen is typically 1.88 mm (0.07 in) long and 1.59 mm (0.06 in) wide and has a similar pattern to the male. Its spinnerets are light brown and its legs are yellowish.

The female's epigyne, the external visible part of its copulatory organs, is rounded. It has an arch near the rear alongside the epigynal border that is sinuous like the related Xenocytaea daviesae. It is also s similar to Xenocytaea triramosa although its insemination ducts are a little longer and open towards the rear of its spermathecae, or receptacles. It differs from these species in that the openings are not hidden under the arch.

== Distribution ==
Xenocytaea spiders have been identified across the Pacific Islands. Xenocytaea stanislawi was first found in the Nadarivatu Reserve, on the island of Viti Levu in Fiji
