= Xenocytaea vonavonensis =

Scientific classification
- Kingdom: Animalia
- Phylum: Arthropoda
- Subphylum: Chelicerata
- Class: Arachnida
- Order: Araneae
- Infraorder: Araneomorphae
- Family: Salticidae
- Genus: Xenocytaea
- Species: X. vonavonensis

Binomial name
- Xenocytaea vonavonensis Patoleta, 2011

Species of jumping spider

Xenocytaea vonavonensis is a jumping spider species that lives on the Solomon Islands. the spider has a typical body length of 2.36 mm (0.09 in). Its front section, or cephalothorax, is generally dark brown while its abdomen, which can be found behind its cephalothorax, is generally whitish, although it is marked by brown sots. Both have patches of identifying iridescent scales visible on them. Its tibial apophysis, part of its copulatory organs, also has a more pronounced hook. Its generally whitish legs are covered in multiple spines. The male was first described in 2011 by the arachnologist Barbara Maria Patoleta, the female remaining as yet undescribed.

== Etymology and taxonomy ==
Xenocytaea vonavonensis is a species of jumping spider, a member of the family Salticidae, that was first described by the arachnologist Barbara Maria Patoleta in 2011. She allocated it to the genus Xenocytaea, which had been first cicumscribed by James W. Berry, Joseph A. Beatty and Jerzy Proszynski in 1998. The genus name is a combination of the Greek word xeno, which can be translated 'strange' and the genus name Cytaea, which denotes that, despite it being similar, it does not belong to that genus. Its specific name is related to the place where it was first found.

In 2015, in the phylogenetic classification study undertaken by the evolutionary biologist Wayne Maddison, the genus was identified as a member of the tribe Euophryini. Previously also known as Cytaeae and Cytaeinae, this is a very cosmopolitan tribe It is a member of the subclade Simonida in the clade Saltafresia. In 2017, the arachnologist Jerzy Prószyński added the genus to a group of genera named Euophryines. The holotype is stored in the zoological museum that was then linked to the Humboldt University of Berlin.

== Description ==
Xenocytaea vonavonensis is a spider that has distinctive characteristics with a body that is divided into two main parts: a forward section, known as its cephalothorax, and, behind that, an abdomen. The male has a dark brown cephalothorax that is typically 1.38 mm (0.05 in) long, 1.03 mm (0.04 in) wide and 0.86 mm (0.03 in) high. It has many iridescent scales on the sides of its upper surface and black areas around its eyes. There are two teeth at the front and a single tooth at the back of brown chelicerae while the remainder of its mouthparts, Its labium and maxillae are also brown, as are the part of the underside of its cephalothorax known as is sternum and its face, or clypeus.

The male's abdomen measures typically 0.98 mm (0.04 in) long and 0.74 mm (0.03 in) wide. It is whitish with a pattern that consists of grey-brown spots and iridescent scales. The presence of these scales, as well as similar scales on its carapace, are one of the identifying features of the species. The spider has yellow spinnerets that are used to spin webs and generally whitish spiny legs.

At the end of its pedipalp is the male's spider's copulatory organs. Its palpal tibia has tufts of hairs visible on its side and has a short curved spike, or tibial apophysis. Attached to the top of the palpal tibia is the spider's pear-shaped cymbium, which is hairy and is attached to a smaller rounded palpal bulb that consists of a bulgy tegulum and a thin embolus starts towards the middle of the bulb, circles round and then projects upwards, ending up beyond the boundary of the cambium and parallel to its hairy exterior. The spider's tibial apophysis is similar to that on the related Xenocytaea daviesae and Xenocytaea maddisoni but has a more pronounced hook. The female has not yet been described.

== Distribution ==
Xenocytaea spiders have been identified across the Pacific Islands. Xenocytaea vonavonensis has only been seen on Vonavona, one of the Solomon Islands.
