= Xenocytaea =

Scientific classification
- Kingdom: Animalia
- Phylum: Arthropoda
- Subphylum: Chelicerata
- Class: Arachnida
- Order: Araneae
- Infraorder: Araneomorphae
- Family: Salticidae
- Subfamily: Salticinae
- Genus: Xenocytaea; Berry, Beatty & Prószyński, 1998

Type species
- Xenocytaea triramosa Berry, Beatty & Prószyński, 1998

Species
- See text.

Genus of spiders

Xenocytaea is a genus of spiders in the family Salticidae (jumping spiders).

Of all 150 salticid genera known from Australia and the entire Pacific, only Chalcotropis, Donoessus and Panysinus resemble Xenocytaea.

== Name ==
The genus name is a combination of Greek ξένος "strange, foreign" and the salticid genus Cytaea. This indicates that despite the similarity of the two genera in male palpal structure, this group of species does not belong in Cytaea.

== Species ==
As of March 2018, the World Spider Catalog lists the following species in the genus:

- Xenocytaea agnarssoni Zhang & Maddison, 2012 – New Guinea
- Xenocytaea albomaculata Zhang & Maddison, 2012 – New Guinea
- Xenocytaea anomala Berry, Beatty & Prószyński, 1998 – Caroline Islands
- Xenocytaea daviesae Berry, Beatty & Prószyński, 1998 – Fiji
- Xenocytaea maddisoni Berry, Beatty & Prószyński, 1998 – Fiji
- Xenocytaea proszynskii Zhang & Maddison, 2012 – New Guinea
- Xenocytaea stanislawi Patoleta, 2011 – Fiji
- Xenocytaea taveuniensis Patoleta, 2011 – Fiji
- Xenocytaea triramosa Berry, Beatty & Prószyński, 1998 – Fiji
- Xenocytaea victoriensis Patoleta, 2011 – Fiji
- Xenocytaea vonavonensis Patoleta, 2011 – Solomon Islands
- Xenocytaea zabkai Berry, Beatty & Prószyński, 1998 – Fiji
