= Cytaea carolinensis =

Scientific classification
- Kingdom: Animalia
- Phylum: Arthropoda
- Subphylum: Chelicerata
- Class: Arachnida
- Order: Araneae
- Infraorder: Araneomorphae
- Family: Salticidae
- Genus: Cytaea
- Species: C. carolinensis

Binomial name
- Cytaea carolinensis Berry, Beatty & Prószynski, 1998

Species of spider

Cytaea carolinensis is a species of jumping spiders.

== Name ==
The species is named for the Caroline Islands, where it was collected.

== Appearance ==
C. carolinensis is similar to C. ponapensis and C. rai. Males are 4–5 mm long, females 5.5–6.5 mm.

== Distribution ==
C. carolinensis is known from Truk and the Palau group in the Caroline Islands.
