= Phintella caledoniensis =

Scientific classification
- Kingdom: Animalia
- Phylum: Arthropoda
- Subphylum: Chelicerata
- Class: Arachnida
- Order: Araneae
- Infraorder: Araneomorphae
- Family: Salticidae
- Genus: Phintella
- Species: P. caledoniensis

Binomial name
- Phintella caledoniensis Patoleta, 2009

Species of jumping spider

Phintella caledoniensis is a species of jumping spider that is endemic to New Caledonia. A member of the genus Phintella, it was named after the archipelago where it was found.

First described in 2009 by the arachnologist Barbara Patoleta, the spider is small and measures between 4.83 and 4.89 mm (0.190 and 0.193 in) in length. It has a brown cephalothorax, the female being generally darker, that features white patches on its head faint lines that radiate from an obvious fovea, or depression in the middle. Behind the cephalothorax is a grey or grey-brown abdomen. Its legs are generally brown some of the sections being lighter than others. It is similar to the related Sri Lankan Phintella volupe and Ugandan Phintella nilotica, but can be distinguished by its copulatory organs. The female has distinctive bean-shaped spermatheca and the male a long and thin embolus that is similar in size to its palpal bulb.

== Taxonomy and etymology ==
Phintella caledoniensis is a species of jumping spider, a member of the family Salticidae. that was first described in 2009 by the arachnologist Barbara Patoleta. The specific name is derived from the name of the archipelago of New Caledonia where it was first found. Patoleta allocated the spider to the genus Phintella, first circumscribed in 1906 by Embrik Strand in a publication he co-wrote with Wilhelm Bösenberg. The genus name derives from the genus Phintia, which it resembles. The genus Phintia was itself renamed Phintodes, which was subsequently absorbed into Tylogonus.

There are similarities between spiders within genus Phintella and those in Chira, Chrysilla, Euophrys, Icius, Jotus and Telamonia. It is a member of the tribe Heliophaninae, renamed Chrysillini by Wayne Maddison in 2015. Chrysillines are monophyletic. The tribe is ubiquitous across most of the continents of the world. It is allocated to the subclade Saltafresia in the clade Salticoida. In 2017, Jerzy Prószyński grouped the genus with 32 other genera of jumping spiders under the name Chrysillines in the supergroup Chrysilloida.

== Description ==
=== Adult female ===
The spider is medium-sized, with shape that is typical of the genus, with a broad forward section, or cephalothorax, with flat sides that is wider than the section behind, its abdomen. The female's cephalothorax is typically 2.34 mm (0.092 in) long, 1.68 mm (0.066 in) wide and 1.13 mm (0.044 in) high. The top of the spider's cephalothorax, known as its carapace, is dark brown apart from faint lines that radiate from an obvious fovea, or depression in the middle. There are whitish patches on its head made of guanine and an eye field that is wider than it is long. The rear of the cephalothorax slopes gently. Its sides are brown, as is the underside of the cephalothorax, or sternum. The part of the spider's face known as its clypeus and its mouthparts, including its chelicerae, labium and maxillae, are also brown. The spider has a single visible tooth.

The female's abdomen is a greyish oval that is typically 2.49 mm (0.098 in) long, 1.46 mm (0.057 in) wide. It has a pattern of light and dark patches on top. its spinnerets are grey. The spider's legs are mainly brown, some of the sections being darker than others. The spider is most similar to Phintella volupe, found in Sri Lanka, but can be distinguished by its copulatory organs. Its copulatory openings are widely spaced and lead via long curved insemination ducts to bean-shaped spermathecae, or receptacles, and small accessory glands.

=== Adult male ===
The male is similar in size to the female. Its carapace is typically 2.45 mm (0.096 in) long, 1.68 mm (0.066 in) wide and 1.12 mm (0.044 in) high. It is lighter brown than the female's carapace, although similar whitish patches are visible on its head. Although its eye field is also wider than it is long, there are dark patches around the spider's eyes. Similarly the female, there are faint lines radiating from its fovea, as is the gentle slope to the rear of the cephalothorax. Although the sides are similarly brown, the spider's sternum is a lighter brown, as are its maxillae and labium. Its chelicerae similarly feature a single visible tooth.

The male's abdomen is typically 2.44 mm (0.096 in) long and 1.17 mm (0.046 in) wide. It is grey-brown on top and has a noticeable hard patch in the middle known as a scutum. Its underside is grey. The spider has grey-brown spinnerets. Its legs are generally brown but have darker brown sections. Its pedipalps, sensory organs near the spider's face, are light brown. Its copulatory organs include a hairy cymbium that surrounds a much smaller palpal bulb. Its palpal bulb includes a tegulum that is taller than it is wide and has a protrusion that sticks out the middle. From the top projects a long, thin and curved embolus. At the base of the bulb is a light brown palpal tibia. This has a short slightly curved spike, or tibial apophysis, Amongst the spiders in the genus, its embolus is most similar to Phintella nilotica, found in Uganda, although it can be distinguished from this species by fact that its palpal bulb is similar in size to its embolus.

== Distribution and habitat ==
The majority of Phintella species are found in the Indomalayan realm. They are very uncommon in New Caledonia, representing about 2% of specimens of jumping spiders found on the archipelago. Phintella caledonia is the most common species. It has only been seen in the rainforest around Mont Panié living at an altitude of between 950 and 1,600 m (3,120 and 5,250 ft) above sea level.
