= Cytaea taveuniensis =

Scientific classification
- Kingdom: Animalia
- Phylum: Arthropoda
- Subphylum: Chelicerata
- Class: Arachnida
- Order: Araneae
- Infraorder: Araneomorphae
- Family: Salticidae
- Genus: Cytaea
- Species: C. taveuniensis

Binomial name
- Cytaea taveuniensis Patoleta & Gardzińska, 2010

Species of jumping spider

Cytaea taveuniensis is a jumping spider species from the Fijian island of Taveuni, after which it is named. A member of the genus Cytaea, it is typically 4.8 cm (2 in) long with a light brown front section, or cephalothorax, and, behind that, a yellowish abdomen. Underneath, it is whitish. It has four teeth at the front of its light brown chelicerae, or jaws, and, like others in its genus, a single tooth with two cusps to the rear. Its legs are yellowish with darker segments. The male was first identified in 2010 by Barbara Maria Patoleta and Joanna Gardzińska. It has a very long and thin embolus, part of its copulatory organs, that has a distinctive risen base. This helps distinguish the spider from others in the genus. The female has not been described.

== Taxonomy and etymology ==
Cytaea taveuniensis is a species of jumping spider, a member of the family Salticidae, that was first described by the arachnologists Barbara Maria Patoleta and Joanna Gardzińska in 2010. They assigned the species to the genus Cytaea, first circumscribed by Eugen von Keyserling in 1882. In Wayne Maddison's 2015 study of spider phylogenetic classification, the genus was listed in the tribe Euophryini, a member of the subclade Simonida in the clade Saltafresia. In 2016, Prószyński added the genus to a group of genera named Euopherines, named after the genus Euophrys. Its specific name is derived from the Fijian island Taveuni.

== Description ==
The male of the species has a light brown front section, or cephalothorax, that is typically 2.45 cm (1 in) long and 1.95 cm (1 in) wide. Its wide trapezoid eye field, which is covered in brown scales, is marked by dark areas that are nearly black and white hairs around its eyes. It has a noticeable dip, or fovea, and a lighter leaf-like pattern on its back. The sides of its cephalothorax are brown. The underside of its cephalothorax, its sternum, is whitish and oval. Its chelicerae, or jaws, are light brown. Like other members of its genus, it has a tooth with two cusps to the rear. It has four teeth towards the front. The remainder of its mouthparts, its labium and maxillae, are light brown.

The spider has an oval abdomen that is typically 2.35 cm (1 in) long and 1.2 cm (0 in) wide. It is yellowish on top and whitish underneath. There are short brown hairs on its upper surfaces. Its spinnerets are light brown. Its legs are yellowish with darker segments. Its pedipalps, sexual organs near its mouth, are brown with a lighter tibia that has a short, slightly curved projection, or tibial apophysis. And the end of its tibia is a hairy cymbium and a tegulum that contains a meandering seminal duct, which leads to a very long and thin embolus that coils counter-clockwise before arching alongside the inside of its cymbium. It is similar to Cytaea nausori but is differentiated by its risen embolic base. The female has not been described.

== Distribution ==
Cytaea spiders are found across the Indo-Pacific. Cytaea taveuniensis is found living on the island of Taveuni at an altitude of between 300 to 400 m (980 to 1,310 ft) above sea level.
