= Proszynellus occidentalis =

Scientific classification
- Kingdom: Animalia
- Phylum: Arthropoda
- Subphylum: Chelicerata
- Class: Arachnida
- Order: Araneae
- Infraorder: Araneomorphae
- Family: Salticidae
- Genus: Proszynellus
- Species: P. occidentalis

Binomial name
- Proszynellus occidentalis Patoleta & Żabka, 2015

Species of jumping spider

Proszynellus occidentalis is a jumping spider species that lives in Western Australia, which is recalled in its specific name, a Latin word that can be translated 'western'. A member of the genus Proszynellus, the spider is small and typically 3.19 mm (0.13 in) long. The spider is generally brown apart from its dark grey abdomen that has a distinctive pattern of light patches, with a forward set that is marked by a series of concentric rings and, behind that, large chevrons. It has light brown legs, the front pair being darker than the rest. The spider can be most clearly distinguished from related members of the genus by its copulatory organs, particularly the existence of a blunt spike, or embolus, at the end of the male's palpal bulb. Arachnologists Barbara Maria Patoleta and Marek Michał Żabka described the male in 2015 but the female remains unidentified.

== Etymology and taxonomy ==
Proszynellus occidentalis is a species of jumping spider, a member of the family Salticidae, that was first described by the arachnologists Barbara Maria Patoleta and Marek Michał Żabka in 2015. It was allocated to the genus Proszynellus, first circumscribed at the same time, which is named after the arachnologist Jerzy Prószyński. Its specific name is the Latin word occidentalis, which can be translated 'western' and relates to the fact that the spider is found in the western part of Australia. The genus' relationship within the wider family is uncertain. It has been tentatively placed in the clade Chrysillini alongside the closely related genus Menemerus based on a study of its morphology. It also seems to be related to Heliophanus, Phintella and Pseudicius. In 2017, Prószyński placed the genus in a group known as Chrysillines in the supergroup Chrysilloida.

== Description ==
Proszynellus are small slender spiders. Proszynellus occidentalis has a body that is divided into two main parts: an ovoid cephalothorax and, behind that, a more rounded abdomen. The male of the species have a brown cephalothorax that is typically 1.73 mm (0.07 in) long, 1.17 mm (0.05 in) wide and 0.49 mm (0.02 in) high. Its eye field is darker, nearly black and the part of the underside of the cephalothorax known as its sternum is dirty brown. Its face, known as its clypeus, is brown while its chelicerae are lighter brown. The remainder of its mouthparts, its labium and maxilae, are also brown.

The male's abdomen is dark grey and is marked with a distinctive pattern of pale patches, with one, consisting of interrupted concentric rings to the front and a series of large chevrons to the rear. Its abdomen is typically 1.46 mm (0.06 in) long and 0.93 mm (0.04 in) wide. The underside of its abdomen is grey as are its spinnerets, which the spider uses to spin webs. Its first pair of legs are light brown, the remainder of its legs being even lighter and are marked with darker rings.

The male's copulatory organs are distinctive. Its pedipalp is similar to its legs apart from a curved spike, or femoral apophysis, on the palpal femur and a long spike, or retrolateral tibial apophysis, that extends from the papal tibia into the spider's palpal bulb. The bulb consists of a rhomboid tegulum that has a thick, blunt and slightly curved spike, or embolus, at its end. Attached to the bulb is a hairy cymbium. The blunt nature of its embolus helps to distinguish the spider from the related Proszynellus nasalis. The female has not been described.

== Distribution ==
Proszynellus live in Australia. Proszynellus occidentalis is found in Western Australia. The spider was first found living in Nannu and near a pool close to the Donnelly River.
