= Rhondes =

Scientific classification
- Kingdom: Animalia
- Phylum: Arthropoda
- Subphylum: Chelicerata
- Class: Arachnida
- Order: Araneae
- Infraorder: Araneomorphae
- Family: Salticidae
- Subfamily: Salticinae
- Genus: Rhondes; Simon, 1901

Type species
- R. neocaledonicus (Simon, 1889)

Species
- 6, see text

Genus of spiders

Rhondes is a genus of New Caledonian jumping spiders that was first described by Eugène Louis Simon in 1901. It was briefly considered a synonym of Hasarius, but was revalidated after the results of a 2008 molecular study. It is now grouped with several other Australasian genera in the unranked clade Astioida.

== Species ==
As of August 2019 it contains six species, found only on New Caledonia:

- Rhondes atypicus Patoleta, 2016 – New Caledonia
- Rhondes berlandi Patoleta, 2016 – New Caledonia
- Rhondes flexibilis Patoleta, 2016 – New Caledonia
- Rhondes neocaledonicus (Simon, 1889) (type) – New Caledonia
- Rhondes sarasini Patoleta, 2016 – New Caledonia
- Rhondes zofiae Patoleta, 2016 – New Caledonia
