= Lagnus =

Scientific classification
- Kingdom: Animalia
- Phylum: Arthropoda
- Subphylum: Chelicerata
- Class: Arachnida
- Order: Araneae
- Infraorder: Araneomorphae
- Family: Salticidae
- Subfamily: Salticinae
- Genus: Lagnus; L. Koch, 1879

Type species
- Lagnus longimanus L. Koch, 1879

Diversity
- 3 species

Genus of spiders

Lagnus is a spider genus of the jumping spider family, Salticidae. It occurs only in the Philippines and Fiji.

== Name ==
The species name longimanus is Latin for "with a long hand".

== Species ==
As of April 2017, the World Spider Catalog accepted the following species:

- Lagnus edwardsi Zhang & Maddison, 2012 – Philippines
- Lagnus longimanus L. Koch, 1879 (type species) – Fiji
- Lagnus monteithorum Patoleta, 2008 – Fiji
