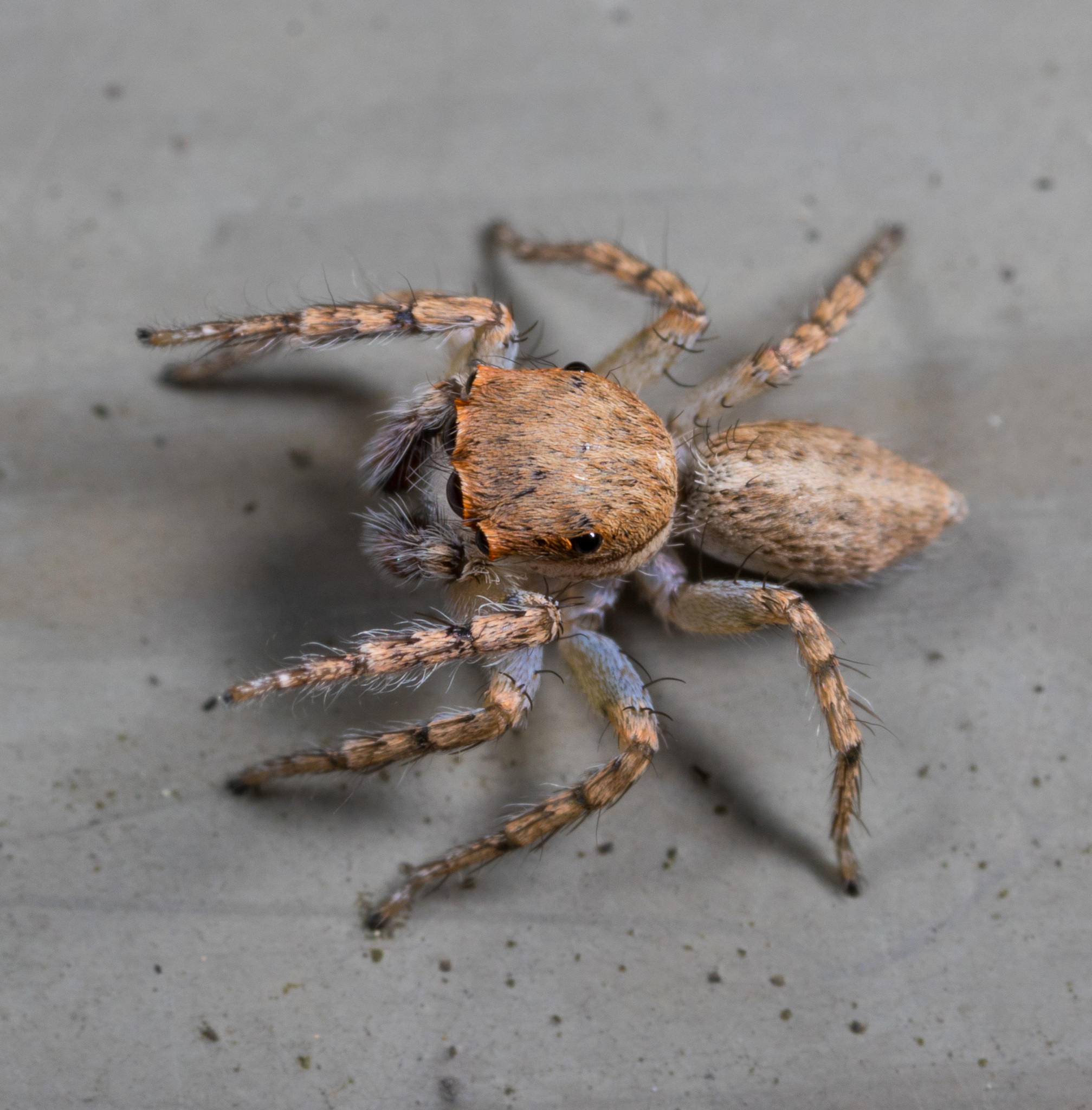
- from Hong Kong

Scientific classification
- Kingdom: Animalia
- Phylum: Arthropoda
- Subphylum: Chelicerata
- Class: Arachnida
- Order: Araneae
- Infraorder: Araneomorphae
- Family: Salticidae
- Genus: Cytaea
- Species: C. maoming

Binomial name
- Cytaea maoming Yu & Zhang, 2022

= Cytaea maoming =

Species of jumping spider

Cytaea maoming is a species of jumping spider in the genus Cytaea. It was described in 2022 by Yu and Zhang from specimens collected in Guangdong Province, China. The species name refers to Maoming, the city where the type specimens were collected.

== Taxonomy ==
Cytaea maoming was first described by Yu and Zhang in 2022 based on specimens collected from Tianlongshan Tourist Area in Xinyi County, Maoming City, Guangdong Province. The holotype male and paratype female are deposited in the Museum of Hebei University in Baoding, China.

== Distribution ==
C. maoming is known only from its type locality in Guangdong Province, China.

== Description ==
Cytaea maoming is a medium-sized jumping spider. The male holotype has a total length of 4.33 mm, with a carapace measuring 2.30 mm long and 1.76 mm wide. The female paratype is slightly larger, with a total length of 4.64 mm and a carapace measuring 2.37 mm long and 1.80 mm wide.

The species can be distinguished from the similar Cytaea oreophila by two key features: males have a developed ventral protuberance on the tibia of the palp, which is absent in C. oreophila, and females have a long, S-shaped copulatory duct, whereas C. oreophila has a short, thick copulatory duct.

The carapace is dark gray with a dark eye field and is covered with white setae. The abdomen is oval-shaped with a gray-black dorsum. The legs range from yellow to gray in coloration and bear macrosetae and hairs.
