= Pristobaeus =

Scientific classification
- Kingdom: Animalia
- Phylum: Arthropoda
- Subphylum: Chelicerata
- Class: Arachnida
- Order: Araneae
- Infraorder: Araneomorphae
- Family: Salticidae
- Subfamily: Salticinae
- Genus: Pristobaeus; Simon, 1902

Type species
- P. jocosus Simon, 1902

Species
- 15, see text

Synonyms
- Palpelius Simon, 1903

Genus of spiders

Pristobaeus is a genus of jumping spiders that was first described by Eugène Louis Simon in 1902.

== Species ==
As of August 2019 it contains fifteen species, found only in Oceania and Asia:

- Pristobaeus albofasciatus (Peckham & Peckham, 1907) – Borneo
- Pristobaeus arboreus (Peckham & Peckham, 1907) – Borneo
- Pristobaeus beccarii (Thorell, 1881) – Indonesia (Moluccas) to Australia
- Pristobaeus clarus (Roewer, 1938) – New Guinea
- Pristobaeus dearmatus (Thorell, 1881) – Australia (Queensland)
- Pristobaeus discedens (Kulczyński, 1910) – Papua New Guinea (Bismarck Arch.)
- Pristobaeus fuscoannulatus (Strand, 1911) – Indonesia (Aru Is.)
- Pristobaeus jocosus Simon, 1902 (type) – India, Indonesia (Sulawesi)
- Pristobaeus kuekenthali (Pocock, 1897) – Indonesia (Moluccas)
- Pristobaeus namosi (Berry, Beatty & Prószyński, 1996) – Fiji
- Pristobaeus nemoralis (Peckham & Peckham, 1907) – Borneo
- Pristobaeus taveuniensis (Patoleta, 2008) – Fiji
- Pristobaeus trigyrus (Berry, Beatty & Prószyński, 1996) – Caroline Is.
- Pristobaeus vanuaensis (Patoleta, 2008) – Fiji
- Pristobaeus vitiensis (Patoleta, 2008) – Fiji
