= Proszynellus wandae =

Scientific classification
- Kingdom: Animalia
- Phylum: Arthropoda
- Subphylum: Chelicerata
- Class: Arachnida
- Order: Araneae
- Infraorder: Araneomorphae
- Family: Salticidae
- Genus: Proszynellus
- Species: P. wandae

Binomial name
- Proszynellus wandae Patoleta & Żabka, 2015

Species of jumping spider

Proszynellus wandae is a jumping spider species that lives in Western Australia. The spider was first identified in 2015 by arachnologists Barbara Maria Patoleta and Marek Michał Żabka and is named after their fellow arachnologists Jerzy Prószyński and Wanda Wesołowska. A member of the genus Proszynellus, the spider is small and between 3.02 and 3.45 mm (0.12 and 0.14 in) long. The female is larger than the male. The spider has an ovoid forward section, or cephalothorax, that is dark brown and, behind this, a more rounded abdomen. The different sexes have distinctive patterns on their abdomen that can help identify the species. The male a light patch shaped like a horse shoe and the female has a series of white chevrons. The males' mouthparts are generally greyish-brown while the female's are brown, its labium and maxilae being marked with lighter tips. Each also has front legs that are darker than the rest. Most have dark rings on them. As well as its abdominal patterns, the spider can be most clearly distinguished from related members of the genus by its copulatory organs. The male's palpal bulb has a curved spike, or embolus, at its end and the female's epigyne has two lobes on its forward edge.

== Taxonomy and etymology ==
Proszynellus wandae is a species of jumping spider, a member of the family Salticidae, that was first described by the arachnologists Barbara Maria Patoleta and Marek Michał Żabka in 2015. It was allocated to the genus Proszynellus, first circumscribed at the same time. The genus' relationship within the wider family is uncertain. It has been tentatively placed in the clade Chrysillini alongside the closely related genus Menemerus based on a study of its morphology. It also seems to be related to Heliophanus, Phintella and Pseudicius. In 2017, Prószyński placed the genus in a group known as Chrysillines in the supergroup Chrysilloida.

The spider's genus is named after the arachnologist Jerzy Prószyński. Its specific name recalls the arachnologist Wanda Wesołowska.

== Description ==
Proszynellus are small slender spiders. Proszynellus wandae has a body that is divided into two main parts: an ovoid cephalothorax and, behind that, a more rounded abdomen. The male of the species have a dark brown cephalothorax that is typically 1.43 mm (0.06 in) long, 0.99 mm (0.04 in) wide and 0.5 mm (0.02 in) high. There are two white spots on the spider's eye field and long dark bristles above its forward eyes. It has a few white hairs on its surface. The part of the underside of the cephalothorax known as its sternum is dirty brown and has darker edges. The part of its face known as its clypeus is brown. Its chelicerae are greyish-brown, as are the remainder of its mouthparts, its labium and maxilae.

The male's abdomen is lighter than its cephalothorax on its topside, marked with a distinctive pattern of lighter markings with two indistinct patches towards the front and a clearer patch at the rear that is shaped like a horse shoe. This pattern enables the species to be distinguished from others in the genus. Its abdomen is typically 1.54 mm (0.06 in) long and 0.92 mm (0.04 in) wide. The underside of its abdomen is light grey, although it fades to a darker colour at its sides. Its first pair of legs are brown with lighter segments. The remainder of its legs are lighter and are marked with darker rings.

The male's copulatory organs are distinctive. Its pedipalp is similar to its legs apart from a clear bump on the palpal femur and a long spike, or retrolateral tibial apophysis, that extends from the papal tibia into the spider's palpal bulb. The bulb consists of a lumpy tegulum that has a lobe at the bottom and a curved spike, or embolus, at its end. Attached to the bulb is a hairy cymbium. The curve in the spider's embolus and the larger size of the palpal bump help distinguish the spider from the related Proszynellus nasalis.

The female has a brown cephalothorax that is typically 1.55 mm (0.06 in) long, 1.02 mm wide and 0.48 mm (0.02 in) high. There are more white hairs on its surfac and its eye field is darker with long brown bristles present above the forward eyes. While its sternum is dirty brown like the male, it differs in its clypeus and chelicerae, which are brown. Its brown labium and maxilae have lighter tips. Its dark grey abdomen measures typically 1.9 mm (0.07 in) long and 1.05 mm (0.04 in) wide. It is marked with a distinctive pattern of light chevrons. The spider has mainly grey-brown spinnerets although the central ones are lighter than the rest. The first pair of legs are dirty orange, the remainder are paler. All have dark rings.

The female's copulatory organs are also distinctive. Its epigyne, the external visible part of its copulatory organs, has two caudal lobes at the front and its two copulatory openings towards the rear at the back of a pair of relatively thin channels. The openings lead, via a simple duct and wider proximal chamber, to a winding distal chamber and thin spermathecae, or receptacles. There are narrow accessory glands that can be found lying across the ducts. The presence of two lobes on the forward edge of the spider's epigyne is characteristic of the species.

== Distribution and habitat ==
Proszynellus spiders live in Australia. Proszynellus wandae is found in Western Australia. The spider was first found in areas of human habitation, living on a cement tank at a shearing shed. It has been also found living on walls.
