= Foordus =

Scientific classification
- Kingdom: Animalia
- Phylum: Arthropoda
- Subphylum: Chelicerata
- Class: Arachnida
- Order: Araneae
- Infraorder: Araneomorphae
- Family: Salticidae
- Genus: Foordus; Azarkina, 2024
- Species: F. stefani

Binomial name
- Foordus stefani Azarkina, 2024
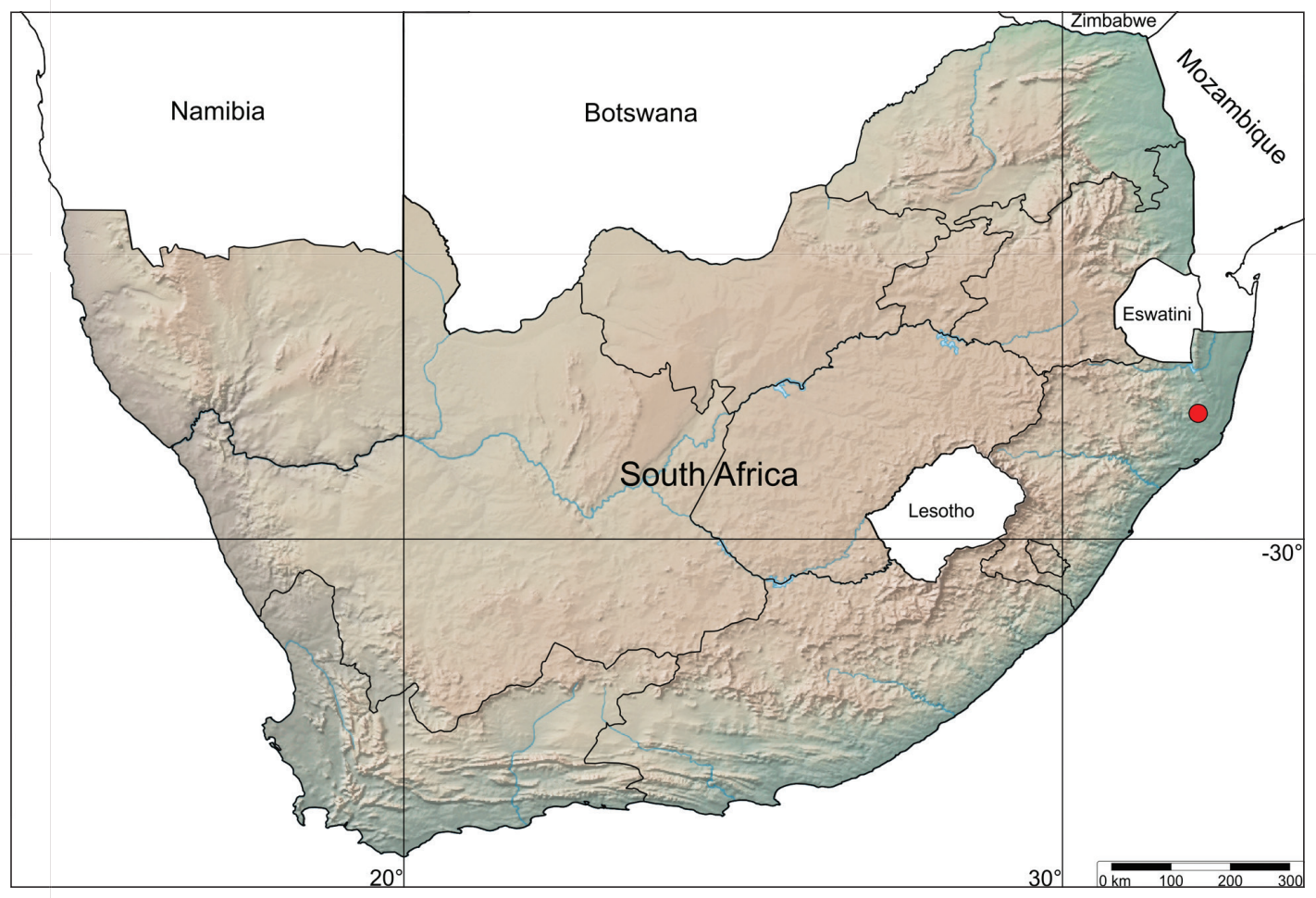

Genus of spiders

Foordus stefani is the only described species in the monotypic jumping spider genus Foordus, in the family Salticidae. It is endemic to South Africa and is commonly known as Stefan's jumping spider.

Foordus is similar to Cytaea, which is distributed from India to Australia and Samoa to the East and South.

== Distribution ==
Foordus stefani has only been found in Hluhluwe–iMfolozi Park in KwaZulu-Natal province, South Africa.

== Habitat and ecology ==
Foordus stefani inhabits the Savanna biome, where it was sampled from grasses.

== Description ==
The male has a brown carapace with a dark brown eye field and dark brown rings surrounding the eyes. The clypeus is brown in color. The chelicerae are light-brown, becoming pale toward their apical ends. The sternum displays a yellow-brown coloration. The abdomen features a dark brown shiny scutum that completely covers the entire dorsal surface of the abdomen. The ventral surface is brown. The book lung covers are yellow-brown. The spinnerets are brown posteriorly and yellow anteriorly. All legs are yellow in color. The femora of all legs are dark brown on both the prolateral and retrolateral surfaces, with the distal portions remaining dark brown. The palps are dark brown, while the cymbium is yellow and covered with short white setae.

The female's carapace is also brown, with a dark brown eye field and black rings surrounding the eyes. The thoracic portion features a yellow-brown longitudinal band running along the midline. The clypeus is brown. The chelicerae are yellow-brown. The sternum displays a brownish-yellow coloration. Both the labium and endites are brownish-yellow, becoming pale toward their apical ends. The dorsal surface of the abdomen is grey-brown and bears two thin yellow longitudinal bands along the median area. The ventral surface is pale-yellow. Both the spinnerets and book-lung covers are pale yellow. All legs and palps are dark yellow with a brownish tinge.

== Conservation ==
Foordus stefani is listed as Data Deficient by the South African National Biodiversity Institute due to the species having a small distribution range. The species receives some protection in the Hluhluwe-Imfolozi Game Reserve but some more sampling is needed to determine the species' range.

== Etymology ==
Foordus stefani is named in memory of South African arachnologist and Azarkina's collaborator Stefan Hendrik Foord (1971–2023).

== Taxonomy ==
Foordus stefani was described by Galina N. Azarkina in 2024 from KwaZulu-Natal and is only known from the type locality.
