= Pristobaeus namosi =

Scientific classification
- Kingdom: Animalia
- Phylum: Arthropoda
- Subphylum: Chelicerata
- Class: Arachnida
- Order: Araneae
- Infraorder: Araneomorphae
- Family: Salticidae
- Genus: Pristobaeus
- Species: P. namosi

Binomial name
- Pristobaeus namosi (Berry, Beatty & Prószyński, 1996)

Species of jumping spider

Pristobaeus namosi is a jumping spider species that lives on Fiji. First described in 1996, the spider is medium-sized, measuring between 4 and 8.4 mm (0.16 and 0.33 in) in body length, the female being larger than the male. The spider is yellowish-brown when viewed from the front and the part of its face known as its clypeus is generally bare apart from a few fine hairs and strong bristles. The female has a white triangle of fine hairs on its chestnut brown eye field and the male has a white diamond-shaped area on its carapace, the hard upper surface of its forward section, behind its eye field There are two teeth at the front and one tooth] at the back of the spider's chelicerae. The male has yellowish-grey legs while the female's legs are brown. The spider has been found living on trees and in houses. It was first seen in the forest of Namosi District, after which it is named.

== Etymology and taxonomy ==
Pristobaeus namosi is a species of jumping spider, a member of the family Salticidae, that was first described by the arachnologists James William Berry, Joseph Beatty and Jerzy Prószyński in 1996. Its specific name is related to the place where it was first found. They originally allocated it to the genus Palpelius, which had been first cicumscribed by the naturalist Eugène Simon in 1903. In 2015, the evolutionary biologists Junxia Zhang and Wayne Maddison transferred it to the genus Pristobaeus based on its features, including its body form, coloration and the structure of its copulatory organs.

In 2015, Zhang and Maddison designated the genus part of a clade named Pristobaeus alongside the genera Opisthoncana, Ergane and Ascyltus. A phylogenetic classification showed that it is a member of the tribe Euophryini. This is a very cosmopolitan tribe It is a member of the subclade Simonida in the clade Saltafresia. In 2017, the arachnologist Jerzy Prószyński added the genus to a group of genera named Euophryines. The holotype is stored in the Bishop Museum in Hawaii.

== Description ==
Pristobaeus namosi is a medium-sized spider that has distinctive characteristics. It has a body that is divided into two main parts: a forward section, known as its cephalothorax, and, behind that, an abdomen. The male has a total body length that is between 4 and 5.6 mm (0.16 and 0.22 in). Its brown carapace,. The hard upper surface of its cephalothorax, is between 2.1 and 2.6 mm (0.08 and 0.10 in) long and between 1.4 and 2 mm (0.06 and 0.08 in) wide. It has a greater slope at the front to the rear and is covered in thin reddish fine hairs apart from a diamond-shaped area behind its eye field that is covered in even finer whitish hairs. It is yellowish-brown from the front with fine red hairs visible around some of its eyes. The section of the spider's face known as its clypeus is low and almost bare apart from a few strong bristles and fine brown hairs on its edges. Its chelicerae are short and narrow with a small, flat, triangular projection. It has two teeth at the front and another behind. Its remaining mouthparts, labium and maxillae, light brown and have a slight slope. The part of the underside of its cephalothorax known as is sternum is whitish.

The male's elongated abdomen is narrower than its carapace. Its upper surface is generally grayish-yellow apart from its edges, which are marked with an irregular pattern of darker grey spots, and a streak that runs down the middle. with two rows of dark brown patches on the top and plain whitish underneath. It has yellowish-grey cylindrical spinnerets that are used to spin webs. Its light yellowish-grey legs have short dark fine hairs and a noticeable number of prominent brown spines.

At the end of its pedipalp is the male's spider's copulatory organs. Its palpal tibia is narrow and has a long slightly curved projection, or tibial apophyses, that curves upwards beyond its tip to run beside its rounded cymbium. Attached to its cambium is a smaller narrow elongated palpal bulb that consists of a tegulum that narrows at the end and a thin embolus starts towards the top of the bulb, coils round and then projects upwards near to the cambium.

The female is slightly larger than the male with a total length between 5.4 and 8.4 mm (0.21 and 0.33 in). Its carapace is similar to the male, but ranges between 2.2 and 3.4 mm (0.09 and 0.13 in) in length and between 2 and 2.5 mm (0.08 and 0.10 in) in width. Its eye field is bare and chestnut brown except for a white triangle of fine hairs between its foremost eyes and two markings, one a faint brown line and the other a lighter yellow line. On the top of its carapace are three dark brown streaks that radiate from the middle. Its clypeus is low and bare apart from three brown bristles and a few fine white hairs. Its slightly bulgy chelicerae are dark yellow with light brownish ends and teeth that are similar to the male. Its legs are brown with spines that are also similar to the male.

The female's epigyne, the external visible part of its copulatory organs, is rounded with its copulatory openings positioned towards the back of two membranous windows. Two broad ducts lead into a chamber at the back of the epigene that shows evidence of sclerotization. A short diagonal ducts then leads to oval spermathecae, or receptacles. There are two sets of accessory glands, one near the entrance and the other near to end of the spermathecae.

== Distribution and habitat ==
Pristobaeus namosi was first found in the hill forest of Namosi District on the island of Viti Levu in Fiji It has been found living at altitudes of up to 900 m (3,000 ft) above sea level. As well as in trees, it has been seen in houses. It has only been observed on this island.
