= Ergane =

Ergane may refer to:

- Athena, as Athena Ergane (Εργανη), the patron goddess of craftsmen and artisans
- Ergane (spider), a genus of jumping spiders
