= Proszynellus =

Scientific classification
- Kingdom: Animalia
- Phylum: Arthropoda
- Subphylum: Chelicerata
- Class: Arachnida
- Order: Araneae
- Infraorder: Araneomorphae
- Family: Salticidae
- Subfamily: Salticinae
- Genus: Proszynellus; Żabka

Type species
- Proszynellus nasalis

Species
- Proszynellus nasalis Patoleta & Żabka, 2015; Proszynellus occidentalis Patoleta & Żabka, 2015; Proszynellus wandae Patoleta & Żabka, 2015

Genus of spiders

Proszynellus is a genus of spiders in the family Salticidae. It was first described in 2015 by Barbara Patoleta & Marek Żabka. As of 2017, it contains 3 Australian species.
