= Rhondes berlandi =

Scientific classification
- Kingdom: Animalia
- Phylum: Arthropoda
- Subphylum: Chelicerata
- Class: Arachnida
- Order: Araneae
- Infraorder: Araneomorphae
- Family: Salticidae
- Genus: Rhondes
- Species: R. berlandi

Binomial name
- Rhondes berlandi Patoleta, 2016

Species of spider

Rhondes berlandi is an endemic species of jumping spider in the genus Rhondes that lives in New Caledonia. First described in 2016 by Barbara Patoleta, the species has been found on both Grande Terre and Isle of Pines, living in rainforests. Only the female has yet to be described. It is small and slender, with a wide brown hairy cephalothorax and thinner abdomen that is patterned with light and dark patches. The species can be distinguished from the related Rhondes flexibilis by its wide epigynal pocket.

== Taxonomy ==
Rhondes berlandi was first identified in 2016 by Barbara Patoleta. The species was named after the French arachnologist Lucien Berland. The genus Rhondes was raised in 1901 by Eugène Simon for endemic species of jumping spiders in New Caledonia. It has been placed in the tribe Viciriini in the clade Astioida. Genetic analysis confirms that it is related to other species found only on the island, including Trite ignipilosa, and not as closely related to members of the Chrysillini tribe, such as the genus Heliophanus, as was originally suggested by Simon. The fact that the species on the island are both closely related to each other and genetically distinct from those found off the island is used as evidence of the evolution taking place after the breakup of Gondwana.

== Description ==
The spider is one of five members of the genus described by Patoleta in 2016. Only the female has been identified. Small and slender, it has a shape that is typical of the genus, with a wide cephalothorax, thinner abdomen, very large chelicerae and very long endites. The cephalothorax is brown, with a covering of white scales, which measures 4.9 mm (0.19 in) long and 3.7 mm (0.15 in) wide. The abdomen is grey-brown and hairy with light and dark patches. Itmeasures 7.5 mm (0.30 in) long and 4.1 mm (0.16 in) wide. The clypeus is narrow and dark brown with white hairs. The chelicerae and front legs are dark brown, although the more rearward legs are lighter. The pedipalps are light brown. The epigyne has a wide pocket. This distinguishes it from other species in the genus, such as Rhondes flexibilis, which has a narrow pocket.

== Distribution and habitat ==
Rhondes berlandi was first identified from the female holotype and eight juvenile paratypes found around Mont Canala on Grande Terre, New Caledonia. They had been collected in 1911 by Jean Roux and Fritz Sarasin. It has also been identified in other rainforest locations around the island and the nearby island of Isle of Pines, and is predicted to have a distribution in other inland areas around the archipelago. Despite the existence of similar environments on other islands across the Pacific Ocean, it is endemic to New Caledonia and there is no evidence of the species in any other locale.
