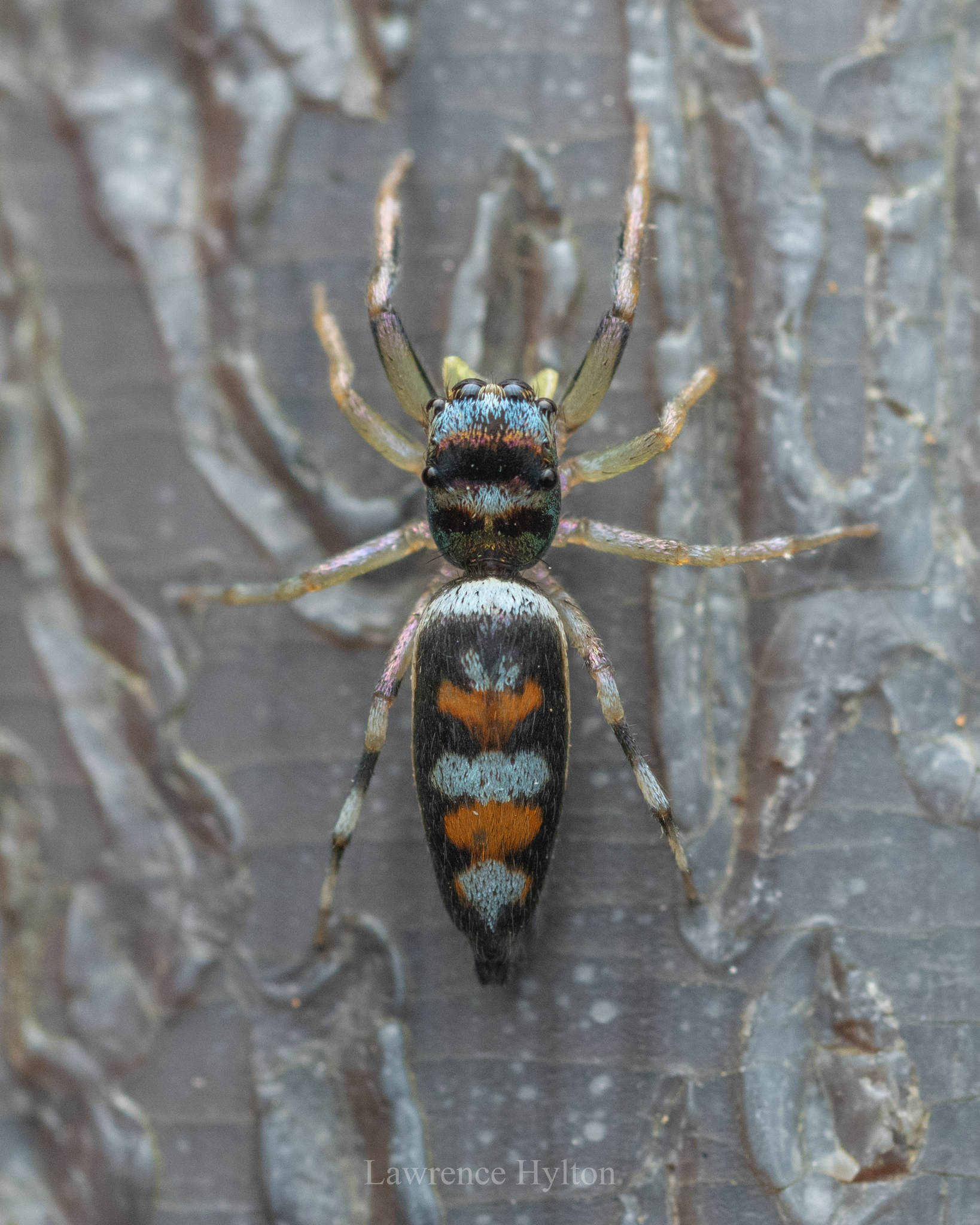
- female from Hong Kong
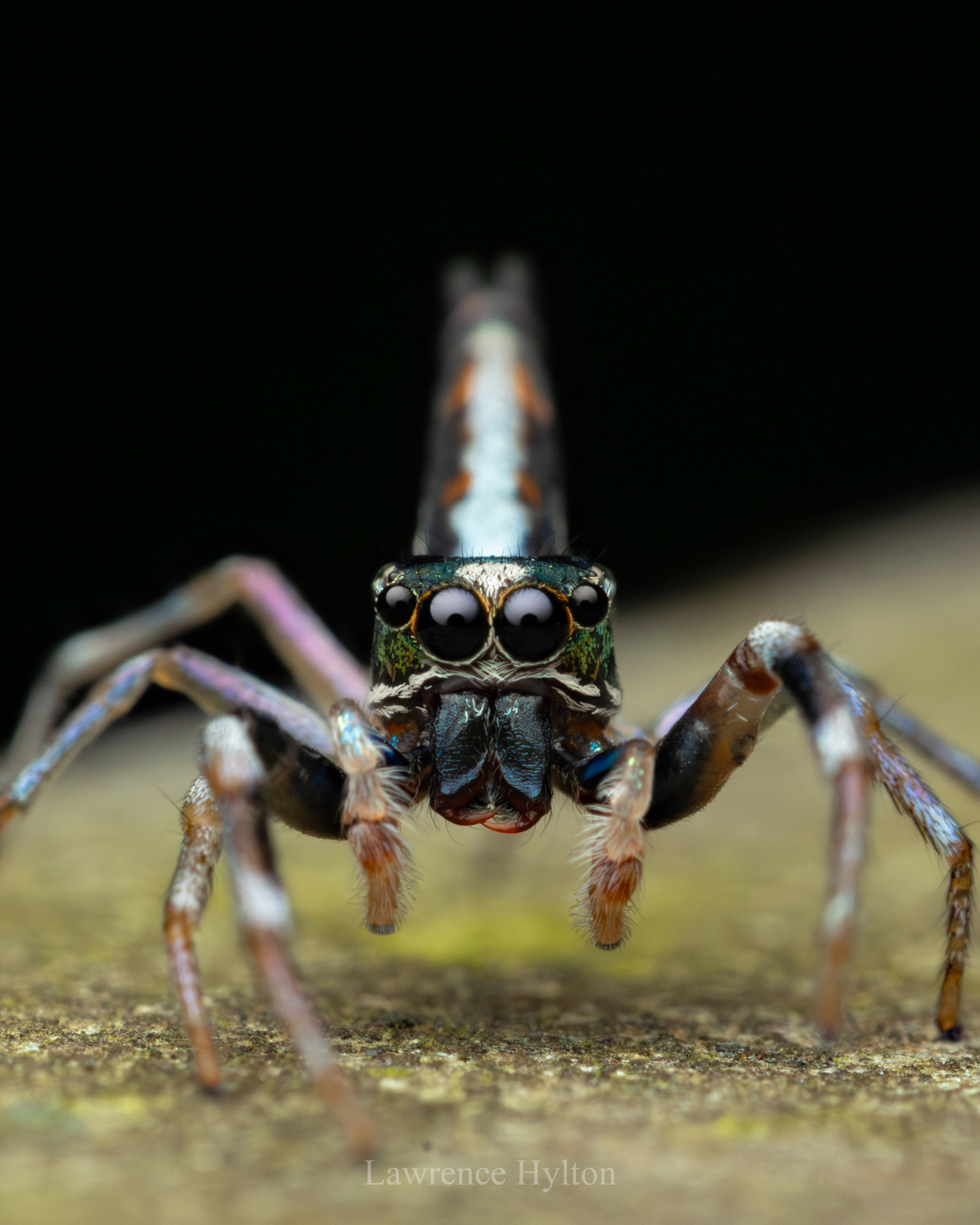
- male from Hong Kong

Scientific classification
- Kingdom: Animalia
- Phylum: Arthropoda
- Subphylum: Chelicerata
- Class: Arachnida
- Order: Araneae
- Infraorder: Araneomorphae
- Family: Salticidae
- Genus: Chrysilla
- Species: C. acerosa

Binomial name
- Chrysilla acerosa Wang & Zhang, 2012

Synonyms
- Chrysilla assamensis Ahmed et al., 2014

= Chrysilla acerosa =

Species of jumping spider

Chrysilla acerosa is a species of jumping spider in the family Salticidae. It was first described in 2012 from specimens collected in China.

== Taxonomy ==
The species was originally described by Wang & Zhang in 2012 based on specimens from Chongqing and Sichuan provinces in China. In 2014, Ahmed and colleagues described Chrysilla assamensis from India, but this was later determined to be a junior synonym of C. acerosa by Caleb in 2016.

== Distribution ==
Chrysilla acerosa is found across parts of Asia, with confirmed records from India, China, and Vietnam. In China, it has been documented from Chongqing and Sichuan provinces, specifically from localities including Jinyun Mountain National Natural Reserve.

== Habitat ==
The species has been collected from natural forest reserves and university campuses at elevations ranging from 238 to 517 meters above sea level.

== Description ==
Chrysilla acerosa is a medium-sized jumping spider. Males measure 6.71–9.70 mm in total length, while females are somewhat smaller at around 7.16 mm.

The male has a dark brown oval prosoma (front body section) that is longer than wide, with iridescent setae on the head region. The chelicerae are elongate and brown. The legs are long and slender, yellowish brown in color, with the first femur showing a black anterolateral surface and metallic blue luster when alive. The opisthosoma (abdomen) is brown with distinctive white longitudinal markings along the midline and brick red markings on the sides.

Females are similar but somewhat smaller, with the opisthosoma being relatively stronger than in males and showing three white and two brick red markings when alive. The species can be distinguished from related species by specific genital features: males have a wider-than-long retrolateral tibial apophysis with a ventral tip and a much longer embolus, while females have anteriorly located copulatory openings and piriform spermathecae.
