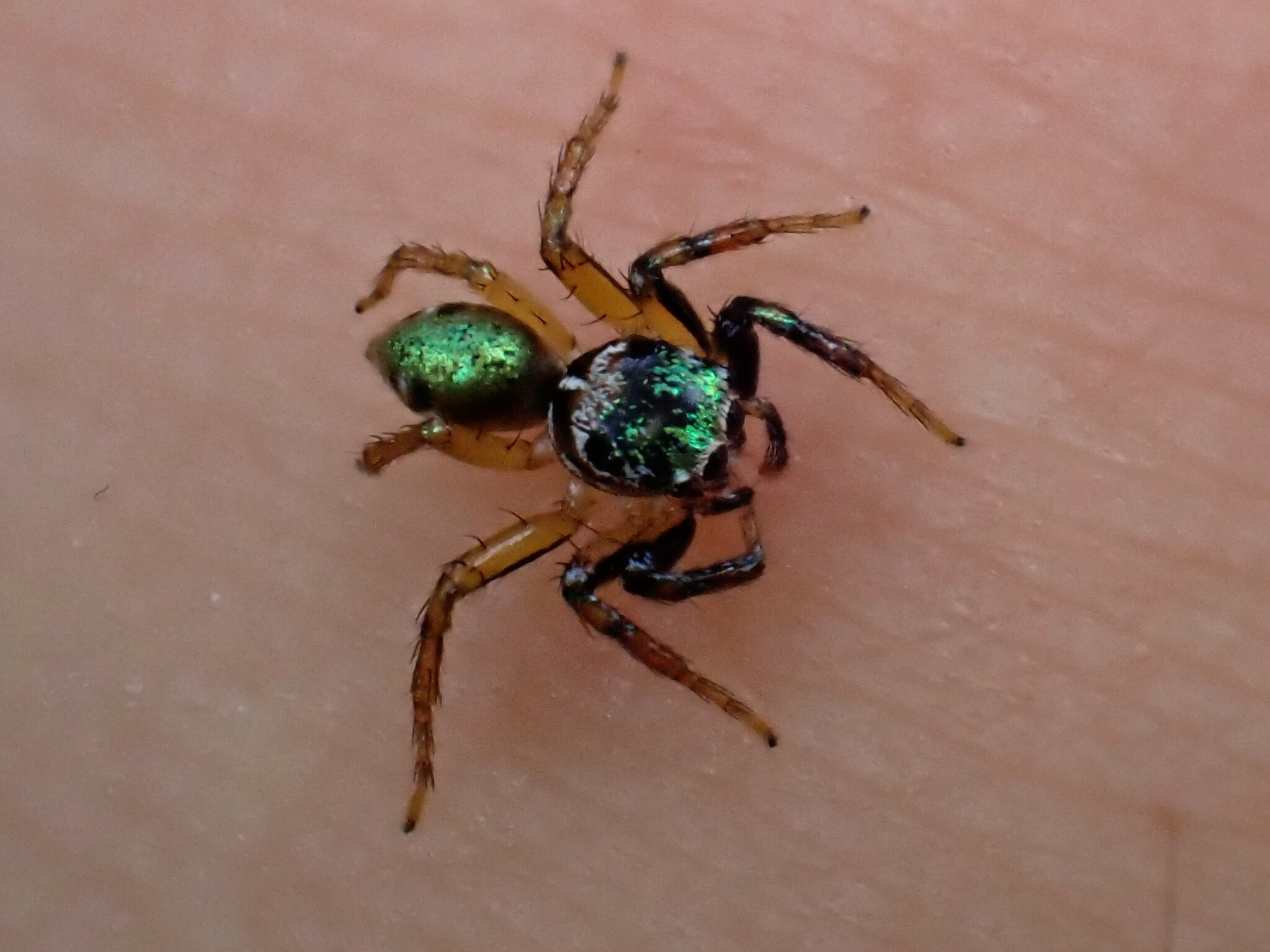
- male from Thailand

Scientific classification
- Kingdom: Animalia
- Phylum: Arthropoda
- Subphylum: Chelicerata
- Class: Arachnida
- Order: Araneae
- Infraorder: Araneomorphae
- Family: Salticidae
- Genus: Cytaea
- Species: C. dispalans

Binomial name
- Cytaea dispalans (Thorell, 1892)

Synonyms
- Hasarius dispalans Thorell, 1892; Cytaea guentheri Thorell, 1895; Cytaea aeneomicans Simon, 1902

= Cytaea dispalans =

Species of jumping spider

Cytaea dispalans is a species of jumping spider in the genus Cytaea. It is found in Myanmar, Indonesia (Borneo, Java, Lombok), and has been reported from Singapore.

== Taxonomy ==
The species was originally described by Tamerlan Thorell in 1892 as Hasarius dispalans based on a male specimen from Java. It was later transferred to the genus Cytaea by Prószyński & Żabka in 1983, who removed it from nomen dubium status.

In 2015, Patoleta & Trębicki conducted a comprehensive taxonomic revision and synonymized two other species with C. dispalans: Cytaea guentheri Thorell, 1895 (originally described from Myanmar) and Cytaea aeneomicans Simon, 1902 (originally described from Lombok). This revision was based on examination of type specimens and detailed morphological comparisons.

== Distribution ==
C. dispalans is distributed across Southeast Asia, with confirmed records from Myanmar, Indonesia (including the islands of Borneo, Java, and Lombok), and has been photographically documented from Singapore.

== Description ==
The original description by Thorell (1892) describes the male as having a pitch-black cephalothorax with a broad white submarginal band on the sides, formed by pubescence, and thin whitish scales showing golden or coppery coloration in the inter-ocular area. The palps are slender and black, broadly testaceous at the base. The legs are brownish-testaceous with black banding on the anterior pairs. The abdomen is ovate-lanceolate, blackish-brown above with thin bronze-green scales on the back and more golden ones on the sides. The total body length is approximately 4.2 mm.

The species was redescribed in detail by Patoleta & Trębicki (2015) based on examination of multiple specimens and type material.
