= Cytaea vitiensis =

Scientific classification
- Kingdom: Animalia
- Phylum: Arthropoda
- Subphylum: Chelicerata
- Class: Arachnida
- Order: Araneae
- Infraorder: Araneomorphae
- Family: Salticidae
- Genus: Cytaea
- Species: C. vitiensis

Binomial name
- Cytaea vitiensis Berry, Beatty & Prószynski, 1998

Species of spider

Cytaea vitiensis is a species of jumping spider.

== Name ==
The species is named for its occurrence on the island of Viti Levu.

== Distribution ==
Cytaea vitiensis is only known from Viti Levu, Fiji.
