= Xenocytaea anomala =

Scientific classification
- Kingdom: Animalia
- Phylum: Arthropoda
- Subphylum: Chelicerata
- Class: Arachnida
- Order: Araneae
- Infraorder: Araneomorphae
- Family: Salticidae
- Genus: Xenocytaea
- Species: X. anomala

Binomial name
- Xenocytaea anomala Berry, Beatty & Prószyński, 1998

Species of spider

Xenocytaea anomala is a jumping spider.

== Name ==
The epitheton anomala indicates the divergence of some characters of the species with others of the genus (e.g. the epigynum).

== Appearance ==
Xenocytaea anomala is about 3mm long, with females slightly larger.

== Distribution ==
Xenocytaea anomala is only known from the Palau District on the western Caroline Islands.
