= Lagnus monteithorum =

Scientific classification
- Kingdom: Animalia
- Phylum: Arthropoda
- Subphylum: Chelicerata
- Class: Arachnida
- Order: Araneae
- Infraorder: Araneomorphae
- Family: Salticidae
- Genus: Lagnus
- Species: L. monteithorum

Binomial name
- Lagnus monteithorum Patoleta, 2008

Species of spider

Lagnus monteithorum is a jumping spider species in the genus Lagnus. The female was first identified in 2008 by Barbara Maria Patoleta.

== Description ==
The species is small and brown, typically measuring 3.6 millimetres (1/8 in) long.

== Distribution ==
Lagnus monteithorum is found in Fiji. The holotype was discovered at the Nadarivatu Reserve on Viti Levu.
