= Cytaea koronivia =

Scientific classification
- Kingdom: Animalia
- Phylum: Arthropoda
- Subphylum: Chelicerata
- Class: Arachnida
- Order: Araneae
- Infraorder: Araneomorphae
- Family: Salticidae
- Genus: Cytaea
- Species: C. koronivia

Binomial name
- Cytaea koronivia Berry, Beatty & Prószynski, 1998

Species of spider

Cytaea koronivia is a species of jumping spiders.

== Name ==
The species is named after the locality where the first specimen was collected.

== Appearance ==
Cytaea koronivia females are up to 7.6 mm long. The male is not known.

== Distribution ==
Cytaea koronivia is only known from Viti Levu, Fiji.
