= Lagnus longimanus =

Scientific classification
- Kingdom: Animalia
- Phylum: Arthropoda
- Subphylum: Chelicerata
- Class: Arachnida
- Order: Araneae
- Infraorder: Araneomorphae
- Family: Salticidae
- Genus: Lagnus
- Species: L. longimanus

Binomial name
- Lagnus longimanus L. Koch, 1879

Species of spider

Lagnus longimanus is a species of spider in the family Salticidae (jumping spiders). It is endemic to Fiji.
