= Xenocytaea zabkai =

Scientific classification
- Kingdom: Animalia
- Phylum: Arthropoda
- Subphylum: Chelicerata
- Class: Arachnida
- Order: Araneae
- Infraorder: Araneomorphae
- Family: Salticidae
- Genus: Xenocytaea
- Species: X. zabkai

Binomial name
- Xenocytaea zabkai Berry, Beatty & Prószyński, 1998

Species of spider

Xenocytaea zabkai is a jumping spider.

== Name ==
The species has been named after Marek Żabka, a Polish salticid specialist.

== Description ==
Xenocytaea zabkai females are about 4 mm long. Males are not yet known.

== Distribution ==
Xenocytaea zabkai is only known from Viti Levu, Fiji.
