= Pristobaeus jocosus =

Scientific classification
- Kingdom: Animalia
- Phylum: Arthropoda
- Subphylum: Chelicerata
- Class: Arachnida
- Order: Araneae
- Infraorder: Araneomorphae
- Family: Salticidae
- Genus: Pristobaeus
- Species: P. jocosus

Binomial name
- Pristobaeus jocosus Simon, 1902

Species of spider

Pristobaeus jocosus is a species of spider in the jumping spider family (Salticidae), found in Sulawesi.
