= Chrysilla guineensis =

Scientific classification
- Kingdom: Animalia
- Phylum: Arthropoda
- Subphylum: Chelicerata
- Class: Arachnida
- Order: Araneae
- Infraorder: Araneomorphae
- Family: Salticidae
- Genus: Chrysilla
- Species: C. guineensis

Binomial name
- Chrysilla guineensis (Wesołowska & Wiśniewski, 2013)

Synonyms
- Phintella guineensis Wesołowska & Wiśniewski, 2013

Species of jumping spider

Chrysilla guineensis is a species of jumping spider that is endemic to Guinea. It was described in 2013 based on specimens collected from the Nimba Mountains. Originally named Phintella guineensis, it was given its current name in 2018. The spider is medium-sized and typically between 4.2 and 5.6 mm (0.17 and 0.22 in) long, the female being shorter than the male. The male is generally brown and greyish-brown on its upper surfaces with yellowish patches on its abdomen. The female is light brown and yellowish grey with darker patches, although one female example is darker with a brownish-grey abdomen. The spider's reproductive system is similar to others in the genus. The male has a thin straight embolus and the female's copulatory openings are hidden in pockets formed by a groove in its epigyne, the external visible part of its copulatory organs.

== Taxonomy ==
Chrysilla guineensis is a species of jumping spider, a member of the family Salticidae, that was first described by the Polish arachnologists Wanda Wesołowska and Konrad Wiśniewski in 2013. It was originally named Phintella guineensis and placed in the genus Phintella. The genus Phintella was first circumscribed in 1906 by Embrik Strand and W. Bösenberg. In 2015, the Australian biologist Wayne Maddison classified it in the tribe Chrysillini, named after the genus Chrysilla. Genetic analysis confirms that Phintella is related to the genera Helvetia and Menemerus.

In 2018, a team led by the arachnologist John Caleb revisited the species. They noted the similarity of the species and the genus Chrysilla. They transferred the species to this genus with the name Chrysilla guineensis. There are similarities between Chrysilla and the genera Chira, Euophrys, Icius, Jotus, Phintella and Telamonia. In 2017, Chrysilla and Phintella had been grouped the genus with 31 other genera of jumping spiders under the name Chrysillines in the supergroup Chrysilloida.

== Description ==
Chrysilla guineensis is a medium-sized spider with an elongated body. In the male, the front part of its body, its prosoma or cephalothorax, is typically 2.3 mm (0.09 in) long and 1.7 mm (0.07 in) wide. The hard upper surface of its cephalothorax, its carapace, is oval, slightly flattened, and brown. Its eye field is covered with white hairs and there are blackish rings around its eyes. The part of the underside of the spider's cephalothorax known as its sternum is dark yellow. The lower part of the spider's face known as its clypeus is low and brownish. Its mouthparts, including its labium and maxillae, are dark yellow, with darker parts at the edges of its maxillae. It has large light brown chelicerae, or jaws, with two serrated teeth to the front and a single wide tooth to the rear.

The male spider has a rear section, known as its opisthosoma or abdomen, that measures typically 3.3 mm (0.13 in) in length and 1.1 mm (0.04 in) in width. It is elongated, narrower than carapace, and greyish brown with some yellowish patches on its upper surface and a yellow-tinge to its grey under surfaces. It has yellow spinnerets. Its first pair of legs is light brown and longer and thicker than the other pairs, which are yellow. There are five pairs of leg spines on the first pair of legs and sparse brownish hairs on all its legs.

Females have a prosima that is 2.0 mm (0.08 in) long and 1.4 mm (0.06 in) wide. Its carapace is oval, light brown, and less hairy than in the male. There is a black area around its eyes. Its sternum is light yellow, as are its mouthparts. Its clypeus is very low. Its abdomen is ovoid and tapering, rather than elongated), between 2.2 and 2.9 mm (0.09 and 0.11 in) in length and between 1.0 and 1.3 mm (0.04 and 0.05 in) in width.

The top of the female's abdomen is yellowish grey with darker spots, turning brownish posteriorly, or sometimes, brownish grey with traces of lighter spots. The upper side is generally hairless, apart from a small number to the front edge. The underside is light and creamy. The spider has long brownish spinnerets and light yellow legs. One example of a female was darker than the others. Its abdomen was brownish grey with hints of lighter spots visible on its surface.

Chrysilla guineensis was identified as a member of the genus Chrysilla by the similarity of its reproductive system to other members of the genus. The male has light, creamy pedipalps, sexual organs that can be found near its mouth. Its pedipalps finish with a single straight pointed spike on its palpal tibia, known as a tibial apophysis. Attached to the top of the tibia is a large elongated cymbium and a smaller palpal bulb, which has a particularly pronounced lump near its bottom and a thin straight embolus sticking out of the top.

The female has whitish pedipalps. Its epigyne, its external visible copulatory organ, has a large shallow groove. It has two copulatory openings that are hidden in pockets that are formed from the forward rim of the groove. These openings lead via long seminal ducts to almost spherical spermathecae, or receptacles. The spermathecae have thick walls that show signs of sclerotization. There are also accessory glands near the spermathecae.

== Distribution ==
Chrysilla guineensis is endemic to Guinea, which is recalled in its specific name. It was first found on the Nimba Mountains.
