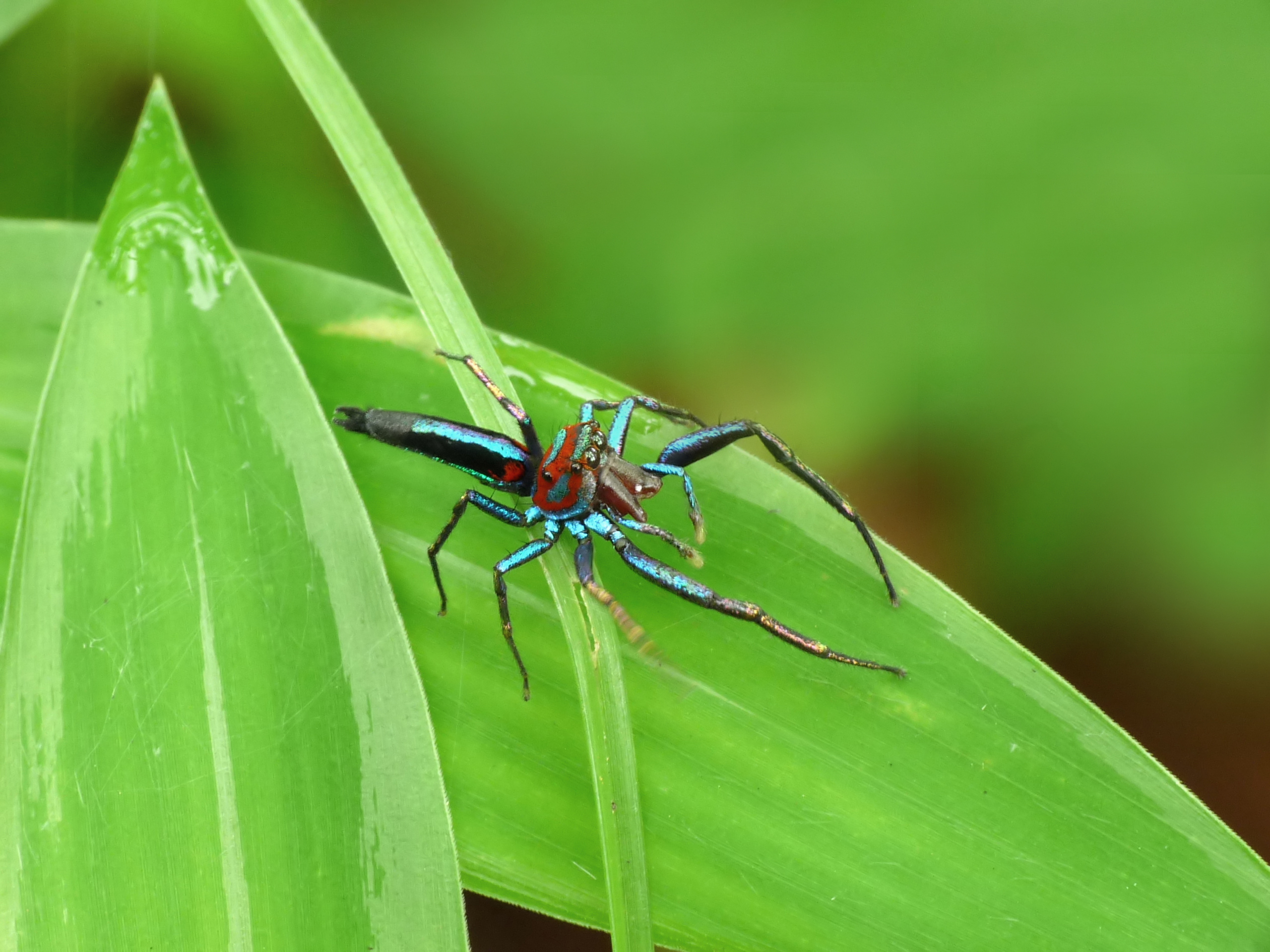

Scientific classification
- Kingdom: Animalia
- Phylum: Arthropoda
- Subphylum: Chelicerata
- Class: Arachnida
- Order: Araneae
- Infraorder: Araneomorphae
- Family: Salticidae
- Genus: Chrysilla
- Species: C. lauta

Binomial name
- Chrysilla lauta Thorell, 1887

= Chrysilla lauta =

Species of spider

Chrysilla lauta is the type species of the jumping spider genus Chrysilla. It occurs in rain forest from Burma to China and Vietnam. Although known since 1887, the female was only described in 2024.

== Description ==
The male is very slender. Its carapace is orange-red, with a narrow bluish-white, iridescent transverse stripe between the eyes. The robust chelicerae do not point forward. The long scutum of the opisthosoma is dark brown and covered with dense, bronze-colored hairs. The long legs are brownish-yellow, with the first pair, and the last segments of the others brown.

The female is smaller than the male, with a body length of 5.0 mm. Live females show parts of the carapace covered with white setae and an abdomen with a pattern of red, white, black and iridescent greenish spots, though this coloration shows considerable variation between specimens. The chelicerae have parallel sides with one distal tooth on the promargin and two distal teeth on the retromargin. All legs are pale in coloration. The abdomen displays few iridescent scales suggesting a vague dorsal pattern, with lateral patches consisting of reddish procumbent hair and posteriorly a pattern of dark areas covered with simple black setae arranged in several reversed V-shaped bars on the posterior half of the abdomen.

== Habitat ==
The species is generally found in forests and gardens, usually by beating/sweeping shrub and trees, from lowland up to 600 m.
