= Cytaea levii =

Scientific classification
- Kingdom: Animalia
- Phylum: Arthropoda
- Subphylum: Chelicerata
- Class: Arachnida
- Order: Araneae
- Infraorder: Araneomorphae
- Family: Salticidae
- Genus: Cytaea
- Species: C. levii

Binomial name
- Cytaea levii Peng & Li, 2002

Species of arachnid

Cytaea levii is a species of jumping spider.

== Appearance ==
The species is allied to C. alburna.

== Name ==
Cytaea levii is named in honor of H. W. Levi, a mentor of one of the first describers at Harvard University.

== Distribution ==
Cytaea levii is only known from Taiwan.
