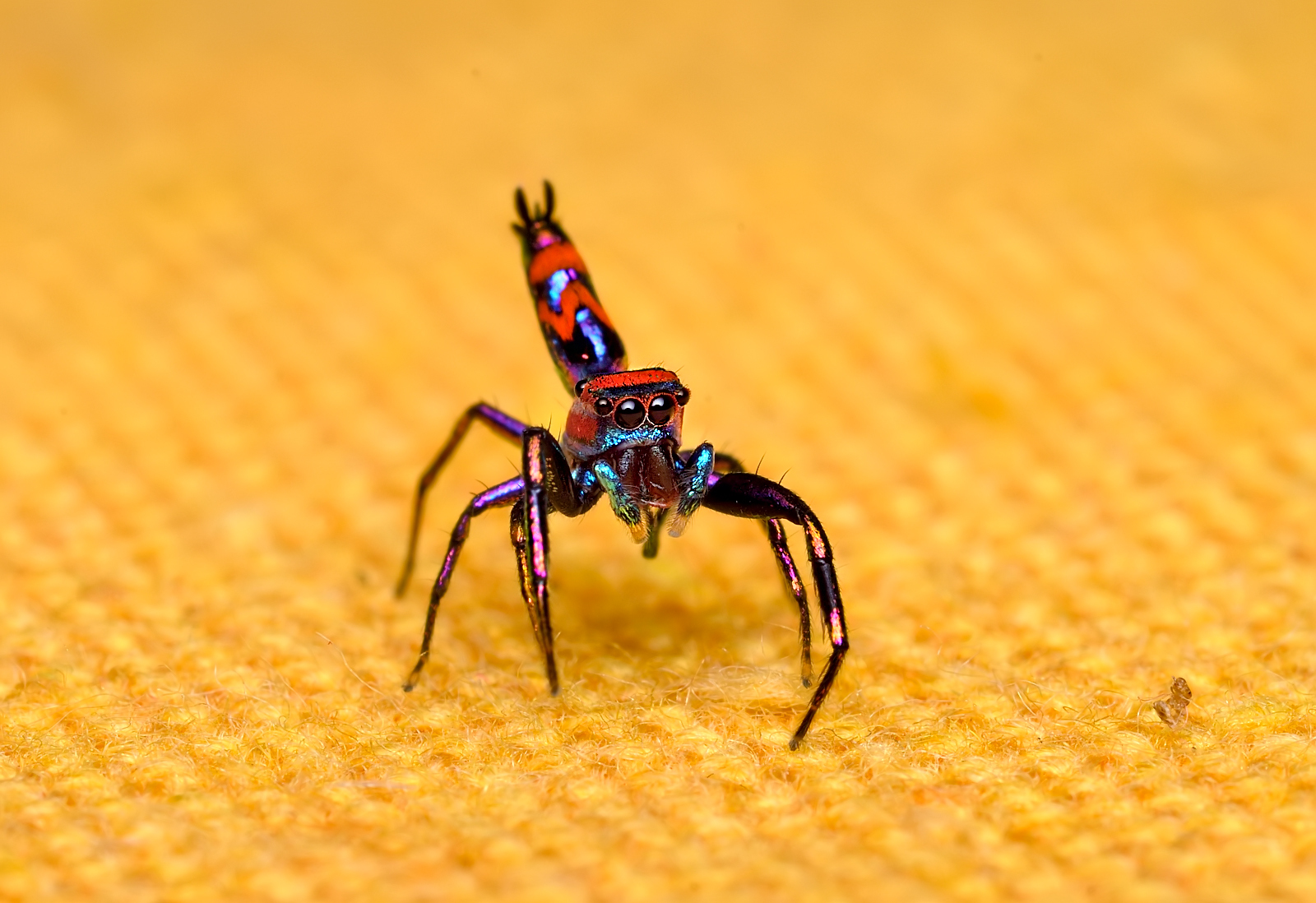
- Male from Kerala, India.

Scientific classification
- Kingdom: Animalia
- Phylum: Arthropoda
- Subphylum: Chelicerata
- Class: Arachnida
- Order: Araneae
- Infraorder: Araneomorphae
- Family: Salticidae
- Genus: Chrysilla
- Species: C. volupe

Binomial name
- Chrysilla volupe (Karsch, 1879)

Synonyms
- Attus volupe Karsch, 1879; Phintella volupe (Karsch, 1879)

= Chrysilla volupe =

Species of spider

Chrysilla volupe is a species of spider of the family Salticidae. It is found in Pakistan, India, Sri Lanka, Nepal, Bhutan, Bangladesh and Myanmar.

Karsch begins his original 1879 description with »Ein durch Mischung von vier, zum Theil metallisch-glänzender Farben wundervolles Spinnchen.« ("Through the mixture of four, partly metallic colors a marvelous little spider"). The species name is derived from Latin volup "pleasant".

== Description ==
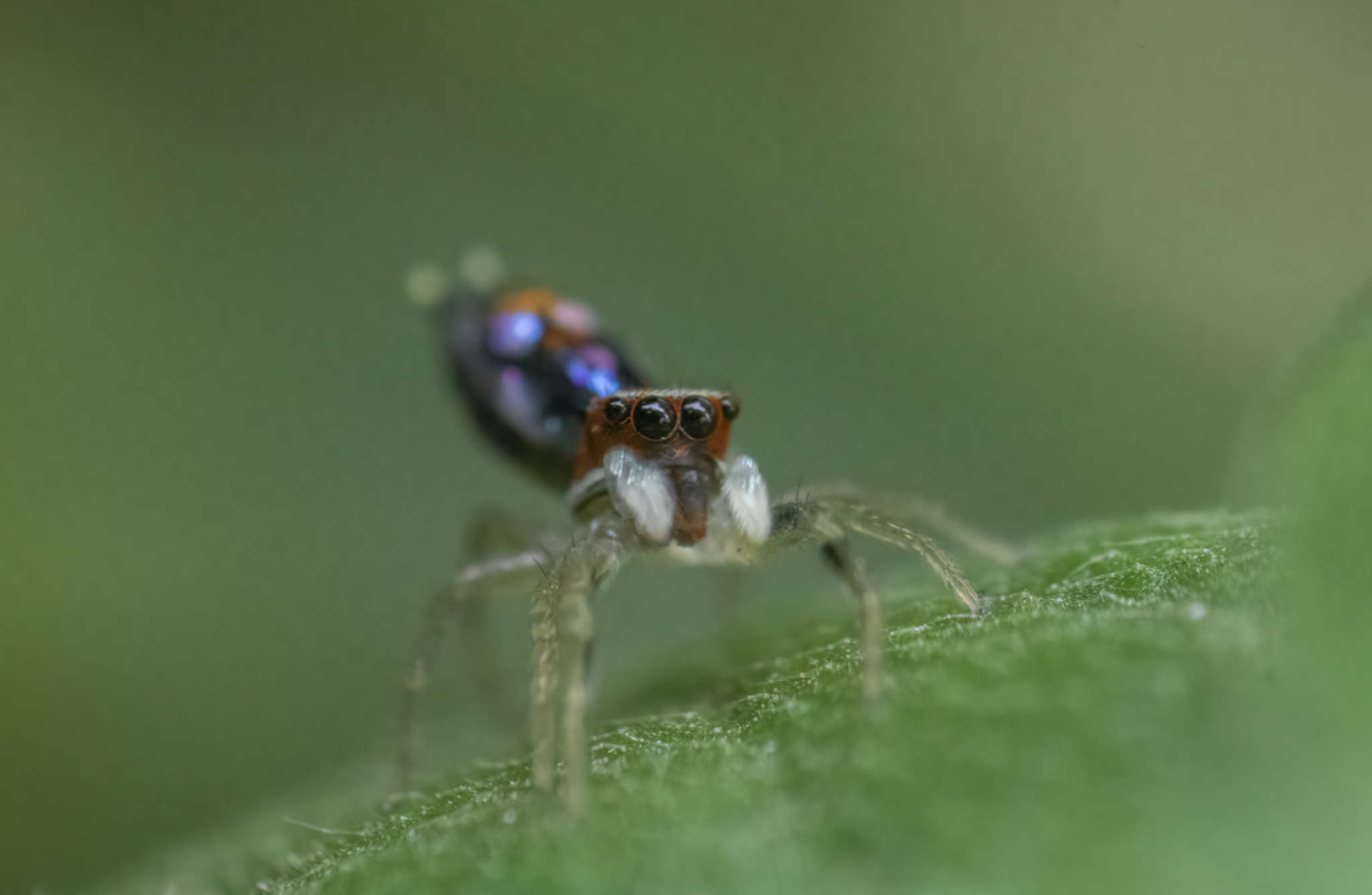
Female from Coimbatore, Tamil Nadu, India.

=== Male ===
The male has a total length of approximately 5.44 mm, with the carapace measuring 2.14 mm long and 1.76 mm wide. The carapace is covered with reddish orange scales and features two broad bluish iridescent transverse stripes—one behind the anterior eye row and another between the posterior lateral eyes. A broad quadrangular patch is present on the posterior slope of the carapace.

The anterior eyes are surrounded by reddish-orange orbital setae in the upper half and white orbital setae in the lower half. The clypeus is covered by bluish iridescent scales that diverge laterally. The first pair of legs is robust and black, while legs II–III are yellow. The tarsi of legs II–IV are white, and leg IV has a dark brown femur with blackish annulation at the joints of each segment. All legs are covered with iridescent scales that reflect metallic shades of golden and purplish tinge.

The abdomen is elongate and narrow, covered with fine iridescent hairs. Reddish orange scales are present mid-dorsally, forming an M-shaped patch resting on a broad transverse patch below.

=== Female ===
The female is smaller than the male, with a total length of about 2.61 mm and a carapace measuring 1.10 mm long and 0.86 mm wide. The color pattern is similar to that of the male but differs in several aspects: the carapace is covered with greyish scales dorsally and lacks the bluish stripes laterally found in males. The carapace rim is outlined by white scales, and the clypeus is uniformly covered with reddish orange scales. The anterior eyes have grey eyebrows.

All legs are yellowish in the female, with leg IV showing dark annulations near the joints of the femur, patella, and tibia. The epigyne features closely positioned copulatory openings facing laterally and situated under a wide anterior flap. The posterior margin is sclerotized and W-shaped, with long copulatory ducts whose anterior halves are parallel. The spermathecae are spherical and contiguous.

== Life history ==
In a study conducted in June 2017 at Aarey Forest in Mumbai, both sexes were collected from a lemon tree in a forest patch near human settlement. Gravid females laid 4–5 eggs in July, with development taking place over approximately 18 days. The eggs appeared yellow initially, and after about six days, a large light yellow spot appeared covering approximately half of the egg surface. The nymphs became visible with distinguishable body parts, though they remained motionless for about three days after apparent hatching.

The newly emerged nymphs had dark yellow abdomens and whitish carapaces with black patches near the eyes. Over the following days, the nymphs developed dark borders outlining the carapace and brown patches on the abdomen. The first molt occurred after about 18 days, after which black stripes appeared on the legs, setae developed over the body, and a reddish sheen was observed on the abdomen.

== Taxonomy ==
The female of C. volupe was described 139 years after the species was first described by Karsch in 1879, based only on the male type specimen. The species was originally described in the genus Attus, later transferred to Phintella, and finally to its current placement in Chrysilla.

C. volupe is closely related to C. lauta Thorell, 1887, from which it can be distinguished by its distinct reddish orange dorsal pattern and the sac-like proximal protrusion of the palpal tegulum (which is more elongated and U-shaped in C. lauta). It is also similar to C. guineensis but differs in having a wider distal tip of the palpal tegulum and laterally directed copulatory openings.
