= Xenocytaea victoriensis =

Scientific classification
- Kingdom: Animalia
- Phylum: Arthropoda
- Subphylum: Chelicerata
- Class: Arachnida
- Order: Araneae
- Infraorder: Araneomorphae
- Family: Salticidae
- Genus: Xenocytaea
- Species: X. victoriensis

Binomial name
- Xenocytaea victoriensis Patoleta, 2011

Species of spider

Xenocytaea victoriensis is a jumping spider species in the genus Xenocytaea. It was first identified in 2011 by Barbara Maria Patoleta.

== Description ==
The species has a brown cephalothorax with white scales.

== Distribution ==
Xenocytaea victoriensis is found in Fiji.
