= Cytaea nausori =

Scientific classification
- Kingdom: Animalia
- Phylum: Arthropoda
- Subphylum: Chelicerata
- Class: Arachnida
- Order: Araneae
- Infraorder: Araneomorphae
- Family: Salticidae
- Genus: Cytaea
- Species: C. nausori

Binomial name
- Cytaea nausori Berry, Beatty & Prószynski, 1998

Species of spider

Cytaea nausori is a species of jumping spiders.

== Name ==
The species is named after the area where the first specimen was collected.

== Appearance ==
Cytaea nausori females are about 6 mm long, males slightly longer than 4 mm.

== Distribution ==
Cytaea nausori is only known from Viti Levu in Fiji.
