= Cytaea ponapensis =

Scientific classification
- Kingdom: Animalia
- Phylum: Arthropoda
- Subphylum: Chelicerata
- Class: Arachnida
- Order: Araneae
- Infraorder: Araneomorphae
- Family: Salticidae
- Genus: Cytaea
- Species: C. ponapensis

Binomial name
- Cytaea ponapensis Berry, Beatty & Prószynski, 1998

Species of spider

Cytaea ponapensis is a species of jumping spider.

== Name ==
The species is named after the island of Ponape in the Caroline Island, where the first specimens were collected.

== Distribution ==
Cytaea ponapensis is only known from Ponape in the Caroline Islands.
