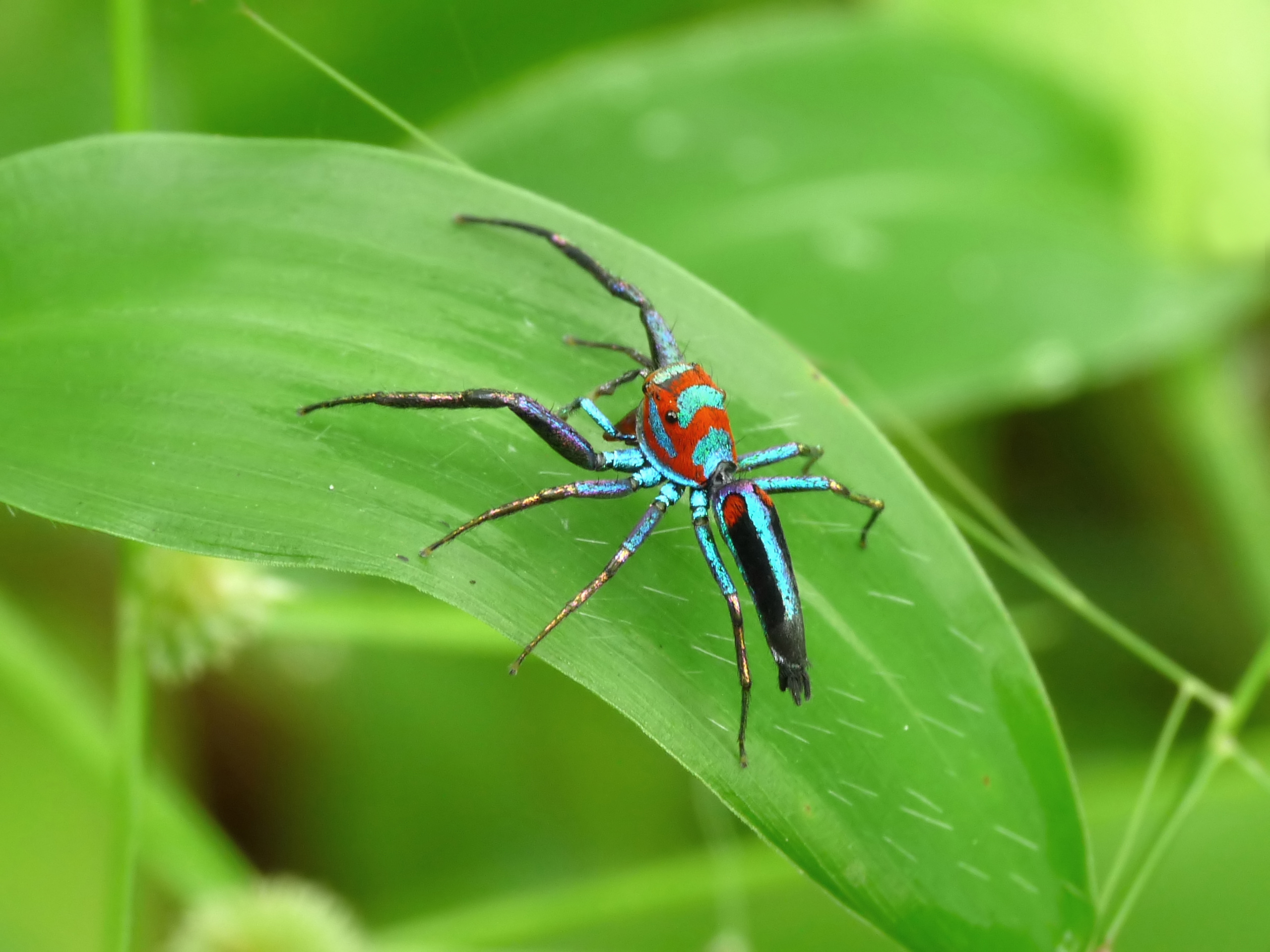
- Chrysilla sp. in Kerala

Scientific classification
- Kingdom: Animalia
- Phylum: Arthropoda
- Subphylum: Chelicerata
- Class: Arachnida
- Order: Araneae
- Infraorder: Araneomorphae
- Family: Salticidae
- Tribe: Chrysillini
- Genus: Chrysilla; Thorell, 1887

Type species
- C. lauta Thorell, 1887

Species
- 10, see text

= Chrysilla =

Genus of spiders

Chrysilla is a genus of jumping spiders that was first described by Tamerlan Thorell in 1887. Several species formerly placed here were transferred to Phintella, and vice versa. Females are 3 to 4 millimetres (0.12 to 0.16 in) long, and males are 4 to 9 millimetres (0.16 to 0.35 in) long. The genus is Persian, derived from the Greek Χρύσιλλα.

== Species ==
As of June 2019 it contains ten species, found only in Africa, Asia, and New South Wales:

- Chrysilla acerosa Wang & Zhang, 2012 – China
- Chrysilla albens Dyal, 1935 – Pakistan
- Chrysilla deelemani Prószyński & Deeleman-Reinhold, 2010 – Indonesia (Lombok)
- Chrysilla delicata Thorell, 1892 – Myanmar
- Chrysilla doriae Thorell, 1890 – Indonesia (Sumatra)
- Chrysilla guineensis (Wesolowska & Wiśniewski, 2013) – Guinea
- Chrysilla kolosvaryi Caporiacco, 1947 – East Africa
- Chrysilla lauta Thorell, 1887 (type) – Sri Lanka, Myanmar, Thailand, Vietnam, China, Taiwan
- Chrysilla pilosa (Karsch, 1878) – Australia (New South Wales)
- Chrysilla volupe (Karsch, 1879) – Sri Lanka, India, Bhutan, Pakistan
