= Xenocytaea triramosa =

Scientific classification
- Kingdom: Animalia
- Phylum: Arthropoda
- Subphylum: Chelicerata
- Class: Arachnida
- Order: Araneae
- Infraorder: Araneomorphae
- Family: Salticidae
- Genus: Xenocytaea
- Species: X. triramosa

Binomial name
- Xenocytaea triramosa Berry, Beatty & Prószyński, 1998

Species of spider

Xenocytaea triramosa is a jumping spider.

== Name ==
The epitheton triramosa refers to the three-part retrolateral tibial apophysis (RTA) of the male palp.

== Description ==
Xenocytaea triramosa males are about 4 mm long, with females up to 5.5 mm.

== Distribution ==
Xenocytaea triramosa is only known from Viti Levu, Fiji.
