= Pristobaeus vitiensis =

Scientific classification
- Kingdom: Animalia
- Phylum: Arthropoda
- Subphylum: Chelicerata
- Class: Arachnida
- Order: Araneae
- Infraorder: Araneomorphae
- Family: Salticidae
- Genus: Pristobaeus
- Species: P. vitiensis

Binomial name
- Pristobaeus vitiensis (Patoleta, 2008)

Species of spider

Pristobaeus vitiensis is a jumping spider species in the genus Pristobaeus. The female was first identified in 2008 by Barbara Maria Patoleta. The species was initially placed in the genus Palpelius but was renamed Pristobaeus vitiensis when Palpelius was accepted as the junior synonym for Pristobaeus.

== Description ==
The species is small with a grey abdomen and a cephalothorax typically measuring 3.1 mm (1/8 in) long.

== Distribution ==
Pristobaeus vitiensis is found in Fiji. The holotype was discovered on the island of Viti Levu, after which the species is named.
