= Namosi District =

Namosi District is a district in Namosi Province, Central Division, Fiji. The province is ruled by a council and chaired by Ratu Kiniviliame Taukeinikoro. At the 2017 census it had a population of 1,259.
