= Cytaea rai =

Scientific classification
- Kingdom: Animalia
- Phylum: Arthropoda
- Subphylum: Chelicerata
- Class: Arachnida
- Order: Araneae
- Infraorder: Araneomorphae
- Family: Salticidae
- Genus: Cytaea
- Species: C. rai

Binomial name
- Cytaea rai Berry, Beatty & Prószynski, 1998

Species of spider

Cytaea rai is a species of jumping spider.

== Name ==
Rai are the large stone discs used as money in Yap.

== Distribution ==
Cytaea rai is only known from Yap in the Caroline Islands.
