= Xenocytaea daviesae =

Scientific classification
- Kingdom: Animalia
- Phylum: Arthropoda
- Subphylum: Chelicerata
- Class: Arachnida
- Order: Araneae
- Infraorder: Araneomorphae
- Family: Salticidae
- Genus: Xenocytaea
- Species: X. daviesae

Binomial name
- Xenocytaea daviesae Berry, Beatty & Prószyński, 1998

Species of spider

Xenocytaea daviesae is a jumping spider.

== Name ==
Named in honor of Valerie Todd Davies, a Salticid specialist from Queensland Museum, Australia.

== Description ==
Xenocytaea daviesae males are about 3 mm long, with females slightly more than 4 mm.

== Distribution ==
Xenocytaea daviesae is only known from Viti Levu, Fiji.
