= Penionomus =

Scientific classification
- Kingdom: Animalia
- Phylum: Arthropoda
- Subphylum: Chelicerata
- Class: Arachnida
- Order: Araneae
- Infraorder: Araneomorphae
- Family: Salticidae
- Subfamily: Salticinae
- Genus: Penionomus; Simon, 1903

Type species
- P. longipalpis (Simon, 1889)

Species
- P. dispar (Simon, 1889) – New Caledonia; P. dyali Roewer, 1951 – Pakistan; P. longipalpis (Simon, 1889) – New Caledonia

Genus of spiders

Penionomus is a genus of jumping spiders that was first described by Eugène Louis Simon in 1903. As of August 2019 it contains only three species, found only in Pakistan and on New Caledonia: P. dispar, P. dyali, and P. longipalpis.
