= Rhondes atypicus =

Scientific classification
- Kingdom: Animalia
- Phylum: Arthropoda
- Subphylum: Chelicerata
- Class: Arachnida
- Order: Araneae
- Infraorder: Araneomorphae
- Family: Salticidae
- Genus: Rhondes
- Species: R. atypicus

Binomial name
- Rhondes atypicus Patoleta, 2016

Species of spider

Rhondes atypicus is an endemic species of jumping spider in the genus Rhondes that lives in New Caledonia. First described in 2016 by Barbara Patoleta, the species has been found on both Grande Terre and Isle of Pines, living in rainforests. It is small and slender, with a wide brown hairy cephalothorax and thinner abdomen. The abdominal markings differ between the male and female, which gives rise to the species name. The male has light and dark patches on its abdomen, and has a longer and thicker embolus than other species in the genus. The female, which is larger, has a striped abdominal pattern, which distinguishes the species from the similar Rhondes flexibilis.

== Taxonomy ==
Rhondes atypicus was first identified in 2016 by Barbara Patoleta. The species was named after the way that the patterns on the abdomen differ between the male and the female. The genus Rhondes was raised in 1901 by Eugène Simon endemic species of jumping spiders in New Caledonia. It has been placed in the tribe Viciriini in the clade Astioida. Genetic analysis confirms that it is related to other species found only on the island, including Trite ignipilosa, and not as closely related to the genus Heliophanus and other members of the Chrysillini tribe as was originally suggested by Simon. The fact that the species on the island are both closely related to each other and genetically distinct from those found off the island is used as evidence of the evolution taking place after the breakup of Gondwana.

== Description ==
The spider is one of five members of the genus described by Patoleta in 2016. Small and slender, it has a shape that is typical of the genus, with a wide cephalothorax, thinner abdomen, very large chelicerae and very long endites. The cephalothorax is light to dark brown, with a covering of white scales, which measures 4.4 mm (0.17 in) long and 3.8 mm (0.15 in) wide in the male and 5.7 mm (0.22 in) long and 4.8 mm (0.19 in) wide in the female. The clypeus is light brown with white hairs and the abdomen is grey-brown. The male's abdomen measures 5.5 mm (0.22 in) long and 2.55 mm (0.100 in) wide and has light and dark patches. The female has an abdomen 8.2 mm (0.32 in) long and 4.3 mm (0.17 in) wide with three brown bands across it. The striped pattern is distinctive and differentiates the spider from the similar Rhondes flexibilis. The chelicerae and legs are brown, as are the pedipalps in the male. The embolus is longer and thicker than other members of the genus. The female has an epigyne with a shallow pocket behind wide copulatory ducts.

== Distribution and habitat ==
Rhondes atypicus was first identified from the male holotype and female allotype, that were found around Mont Panié on Grande Terre, New Caledonia in 1984. It has also been identified in other rainforest locations around the island and the nearby island of Isle of Pines, and is predicted to have a distribution in other inland areas around the archipelago. Despite the existence of similar environments on other islands across the Pacific Ocean, there is no evidence of the species in any other locale, and so it is endemic to New Caledonia.
