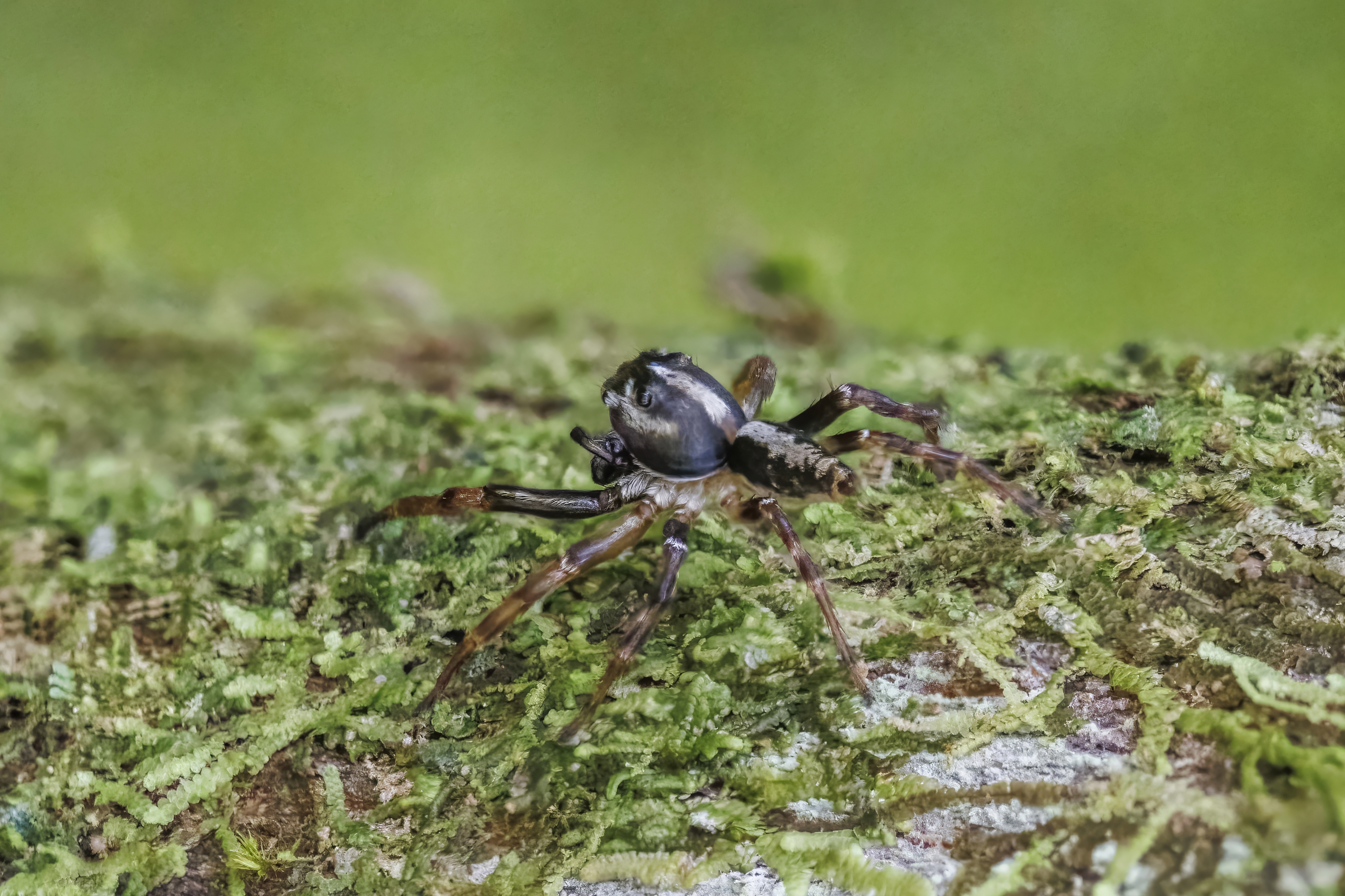
- in Palau

Scientific classification
- Kingdom: Animalia
- Phylum: Arthropoda
- Subphylum: Chelicerata
- Class: Arachnida
- Order: Araneae
- Infraorder: Araneomorphae
- Family: Salticidae
- Subfamily: Salticinae
- Genus: Chalcotropis; Simon, 1902

Type species
- C. acutefrenata Simon, 1902

Species
- 10, see text

= Chalcotropis =

Genus of spiders

Chalcotropis is a genus of jumping spiders that was first described by Eugène Louis Simon in 1902.

== Species ==
As of June 2019 it contains ten species, found only in Asia and on the Polynesian Islands:

- Chalcotropis acutefrenata Simon, 1902 (type) – Indonesia (Java)
- Chalcotropis caelodentata Merian, 1911 – Indonesia (Sulawesi)
- Chalcotropis caeruleus (Karsch, 1880) – Philippines
- Chalcotropis celebensis Merian, 1911 – Indonesia (Sulawesi)
- Chalcotropis decemstriata Simon, 1902 – Philippines
- Chalcotropis insularis (Keyserling, 1881) – Tonga
- Chalcotropis luceroi Barrion & Litsinger, 1995 – Philippines
- Chalcotropis pennata Simon, 1902 – India
- Chalcotropis praeclara Simon, 1902 – Philippines
- Chalcotropis radiata Simon, 1902 – Indonesia (Sulawesi)
