= Proszynellus nasalis =

Scientific classification
- Kingdom: Animalia
- Phylum: Arthropoda
- Subphylum: Chelicerata
- Class: Arachnida
- Order: Araneae
- Infraorder: Araneomorphae
- Family: Salticidae
- Genus: Proszynellus
- Species: P. nasalis

Binomial name
- Proszynellus nasalis Patoleta & Żabka, 2015

Species of jumping spider

Proszynellus nasalis is a jumping spider species that lives in Western Australia. The type species of the genus Proszynellus, the spider is small and between 3.02 and 3.45 mm (0.12 and 0.14 in) long. The female is larger than the male. The spider has an ovoid forward section, or cephalothorax, that is dark brown and, behind this, a thinner abdomen that is dark grey on top and beige-grey or brownish-grey underneath. It can be most clearly distinguished from related members of the genus by its copulatory organs. The male has a bump on its palpal femur and a thin dagger-like embolus on its palpal bulb. On its epigyne, the external visible part of its copulatory organs, the female has a projection, or caudal lobe, that looks like the face of a proboscis monkey, Nasalis larvatus. It is this projection that gave the species its specific name. The spider was first identified in 2015 by Barbara Maria Patoleta and Marek Michał Żabka.

== Etymology and taxonomy ==
Proszynellus nasalis is a species of jumping spider, a member of the family Salticidae, that was first described by the arachnologists Barbara Maria Patoleta and Marek Michał Żabka in 2015. It was allocated as the type species for the genus Proszynellus, first circumscribed at the same time. Its genusx§ is named after the arachnologist Jerzy Prószyński. Its specific name recalls the proboscis monkey, Nasalis larvatus, whose distinctive face is similar to the appearance of the female's copulatory organs. The genus' relationship within the wider family is uncertain. It has been tentatively placed in the clade Chrysillini alongside the closely related genus Menemerus based on a study of its morphology. It also seems to be related to Heliophanus, Phintella and Pseudicius. In 2017, Prószyński placed the genus in a group known as Chrysillines in the supergroup Chrysilloida.

== Description ==
Proszynellus are small slender spiders. Proszynellus nasalis has a body that is divided into two main parts: an ovoid cephalothorax and, behind that, a thinner abdomen. The male of the species have a dark brown cephalothorax that is typically 1.44 mm (0.06 in) long, 1.02 mm (0.04 in) wide and 0.49 mm (0.02 in) high. It has a scattering of white hairs on its surface, two dark spots on its eye field and long dark bristles near its front row of eyes. Its chelicerae are brown with light edges while the remainder of its mouthparts, its labium and maxilae, are brown-grey along with the part of the underside of the cephalothorax known as its sternum.

The male's abdomen is dark grey on its topside, marked with a pattern of slightly lighter chevrons, and has a tuft of grey hairs at the very end. It is typically 1.58 mm (0.06 in) long and 0.99 mm (0.04 in) wide. Its sides are darker, although they have lighter lines, and underneath it is brownish-grey. Its first pair of legs are dirty brown and darker around their joints, while the remaining legs are lighter. Its spinnerets, used for spinning webs, are dark grey.

The male's copulatory organs are distinctive. Its pedipalp is similar to its legs apart from a clear bump on the palpal femur and a long spike, or retrolateral tibial apophysis, that extends from the papal tibia into the spider's palpal bulb. The bulb consists of a lumpy tegulum that has a lobe at the bottom and a short dagger-like spike, or embolus, at its end. The embolus has a membrane. Attached to the bulb is a hairy cymbium that has a cymbial flange at its base. The retrolateral tibial apophysis ends in a valley in this cymbium. The small bump on the palpal femur and the thin, pointed embolus help distinguish the species from others in the genus.

The female is similar to the male, differing in details like the colour of its mouthparts, its chelicerae, labium and maxillae being pale brownish, its dirty-grey sternum and its beige-grey abdomen-underside. Its dirty-grey legs have pale rings. It is with a cephalothorax that is typically 1.55 mm (0.06 in) long, 1.02 mm wide and 0.48 mm (0.02 in) high and an abdomen that is typically 1.9 mm (0.07 in) long and 1.05 mm (0.04 in) wide. Its copulatory organs are distinctive. Its epigyne, the external visible part of its copulatory organs, has a distinctive projection, or caudal lobe, that starts between the two copulatory openings and extends beyond its edges. The openings lead, via a simple duct, to a winding distal chamber and thin spermathecae, or receptacles. There are small accessory glands that can be found lying across the ducts.

== Distribution ==
Proszynellus live in Australia. Proszynellus nasalis is found in Western Australia. The spider was first found in Corymbia calophylla trees in Karragullen and in the areas around mines near Jarrahdale.
