= Xenocytaea maddisoni =

Scientific classification
- Kingdom: Animalia
- Phylum: Arthropoda
- Subphylum: Chelicerata
- Class: Arachnida
- Order: Araneae
- Infraorder: Araneomorphae
- Family: Salticidae
- Genus: Xenocytaea
- Species: X. maddisoni

Binomial name
- Xenocytaea maddisoni Berry, Beatty & Prószyński, 1998

Species of spider

Xenocytaea maddisoni is a jumping spider.

== Name ==
It is named after Wayne Maddison, a Salticid specialist at the University of British Columbia.

== Description ==
Xenocytaea maddisoni is about 3.5 mm long, with females about 4 mm.

== Distribution ==
Xenocytaea maddisoni is only known from Viti Levu, Fiji.
