= Rhondes flexibilis =

Scientific classification
- Kingdom: Animalia
- Phylum: Arthropoda
- Subphylum: Chelicerata
- Class: Arachnida
- Order: Araneae
- Infraorder: Araneomorphae
- Family: Salticidae
- Genus: Rhondes
- Species: R. flexibilis

Binomial name
- Rhondes flexibilis Patoleta, 2016

Species of spider

Rhondes flexibilis is an endemic species of jumping spider in the genus Rhondes that lives in New Caledonia. First described in 2016 by Barbara Patoleta, the species is common across the island, living in rainforests. It is small and slender, with a wide brown hairy cephalothorax and thinner abdomen that has a pattern of light and dark patches. The male, which is slightly larger, has a variably-shaped sclerite on the palpal bulb, after which the species is named. The female has a slightly less distinctive abdominal pattern and an epigyne with a relatively long and narrow pocket.

== Taxonomy ==
Rhondes flexibilis was first identified in 2016 by Barbara Patoleta. The species was named after shape of the sclerite on the palpal bulb, which is quite variable. The genus Rhondes was raised in 1901 by Eugène Simon for endemic species of jumping spiders in New Caledonia. It has been placed in the tribe Viciriini in the clade Astioida. Genetic analysis confirms that it is related to other species found only on the island, including Trite ignipilosa, and not as closely related to the genus Heliophanus, and other members of the Chrysillini tribe, as was originally suggested. The fact that the species on the island are both closely related to each other and genetically distinct from those found off the island is used as evidence of the evolution taking place after the breakup of Gondwana.

== Description ==
The spider is one of five members of the genus described by Patoleta in 2016. Small and slender, it has a shape that is typical of the genus, with a wide cephalothorax, thinner abdomen, very large chelicerae and very long endites. The cephalothorax is dark brown, with a covering of white scales, which measures 4.8 mm (0.19 in) long and 3 mm (0.12 in) wide in the male and 3.2 mm (0.13 in) long and 2.7 mm (0.11 in) wide in the female. The abdomen is grey-brown with sparse brown hairs. The male's abdomen measures 5.3 mm (0.21 in) long and 2.7 mm (0.11 in) wide and has light and dark patches. The female has an abdomen 03 mm (0.12 in) shorter with less contrast between the patches. The chelicerae, endites and clypeus are all light brown, as are the pedipalps in the male. The embolus is long and thin, although shorter than the related Rhondes atypicus. The female has an epigyne with a narrow and relatively long pocket.

== Distribution and habitat ==
Rhondes flexibilis was first identified from specimens, which included the male holotype and female allotype, that were found around Mont Panié on Grande Terre, New Caledonia. They had been collected in 1911 by Jean Roux and Fritz Sarasin. It has also been seen in many other rainforest areas around the island, and is predicted to have a distribution across the archipelago. Despite the existence of similar environments on other islands across the Pacific Ocean, there is no evidence of the species in any other locale, and so it is endemic to New Caledonia.
