= Opisthoncana =

Scientific classification
- Kingdom: Animalia
- Phylum: Arthropoda
- Subphylum: Chelicerata
- Class: Arachnida
- Order: Araneae
- Infraorder: Araneomorphae
- Family: Salticidae
- Genus: Opisthoncana; Strand, 1913
- Species: O. formidabilis

Binomial name
- Opisthoncana formidabilis Strand, 1913

Genus of spiders

Opisthoncana is a monotypic genus of jumping spiders containing the single species, Opisthoncana formidabilis. It was first described by Embrik Strand in 1913, and is only found on New Ireland. The name is a variation of the salticid genus Opisthoncus.
