= Ergane (spider) =

Scientific classification
- Kingdom: Animalia
- Phylum: Arthropoda
- Subphylum: Chelicerata
- Class: Arachnida
- Order: Araneae
- Infraorder: Araneomorphae
- Family: Salticidae
- Subfamily: Salticinae
- Genus: Ergane; L. Koch, 1881

Type species
- E. cognata L. Koch, 1881

Species
- 4, see text

Synonyms
- Afiola Peckham & Peckham, 1907

Genus of spiders

Ergane is a genus of jumping spiders that was first described by Ludwig Carl Christian Koch in 1881. Males of E. benjarei is 9 millimetres (0.35 in) long. The form of the pedipalp and the abdominal pattern suggest that Ergane is close to Chalcotropis. It is named after the goddess Athena, called Athena Ergane as the patron of craftsmen and artisans.

== Species ==
As of June 2019 it contains four species, found in the Philippines, Indonesia, Australia, and Kiribati:

- Ergane benjarei (Peckham & Peckham, 1907) – Borneo
- Ergane carinata Berry, Beatty & Prószyński, 1996 – Philippines, Caroline Is.
- Ergane cognata L. Koch, 1881 (type) – Australia (Northern Territory)
- Ergane insulana L. Koch, 1881 – Australia
