= Barbara Maria Patoleta =

Polish arachnologist

- Citizenship: Polish
- Education: Siedlce University of Natural Sciences and Humanities
- Scientific career
- Fields: Arachnology
- Workplaces: American Museum of Natural History, New York City; Muséum National d'Histoire Naturelle, Paris; Queensland Museum, Brisbane; Tasmanian Museum and Art Gallery, Hobart; Australian Museum, Sydney
- Thesis: Salticidae of New Caledonia and Fidji (2002)
- Doctoral advisor: Marek Michał Żabka

Barbara Maria Patoleta is a Polish arachnologist who specialises in the taxonomy, evolution and zoogeography of jumping spiders (family Salticidae) in the Pacific Islands.

== Education ==
Patoleta studied biology and chemistry at high school before studying biology at the Faculty of Agriculture at Siedlce University of Natural Sciences and Humanities between 1988 and 1993. She obtained her master's degree in the Department of Anatomy and Vertebrate Morphology in 1993, and subsequently her doctorate in 2002.

== Taxa described ==
As of April 2017, the World Spider Catalog lists the following taxa described by Patoleta:

- Cytaea taveuniensis Patoleta & Gardzińska, 2010
- Lagnus monteithorum Patoleta, 2008
- Phintella caledoniensis Patoleta, 2009
- Pristobaeus taveuniensis (Patoleta, 2008)
- Pristobaeus vanuaensis (Patoleta, 2008)
- Pristobaeus vitiensis (Patoleta, 2008)
- Proszynellus nasalis Patoleta & Żabka, 2015
- Proszynellus occidentalis Patoleta & Żabka, 2015
- Proszynellus wandae Patoleta & Żabka, 2015
- Rhondes atypicus Patoleta, 2016
- Rhondes berlandi Patoleta, 2016
- Rhondes flexibilis Patoleta, 2016
- Rhondes sarasini Patoleta, 2016
- Rhondes zofiae Patoleta, 2016
- Trite caledoniensis Patoleta, 2014
- Trite guilberti Patoleta, 2014
- Trite simoni Patoleta, 2014
- Xenocytaea stanislawi Patoleta, 2011
- Xenocytaea taveuniensis Patoleta, 2011
- Xenocytaea victoriensis Patoleta, 2011
- Xenocytaea vonavonensis Patoleta, 2011
