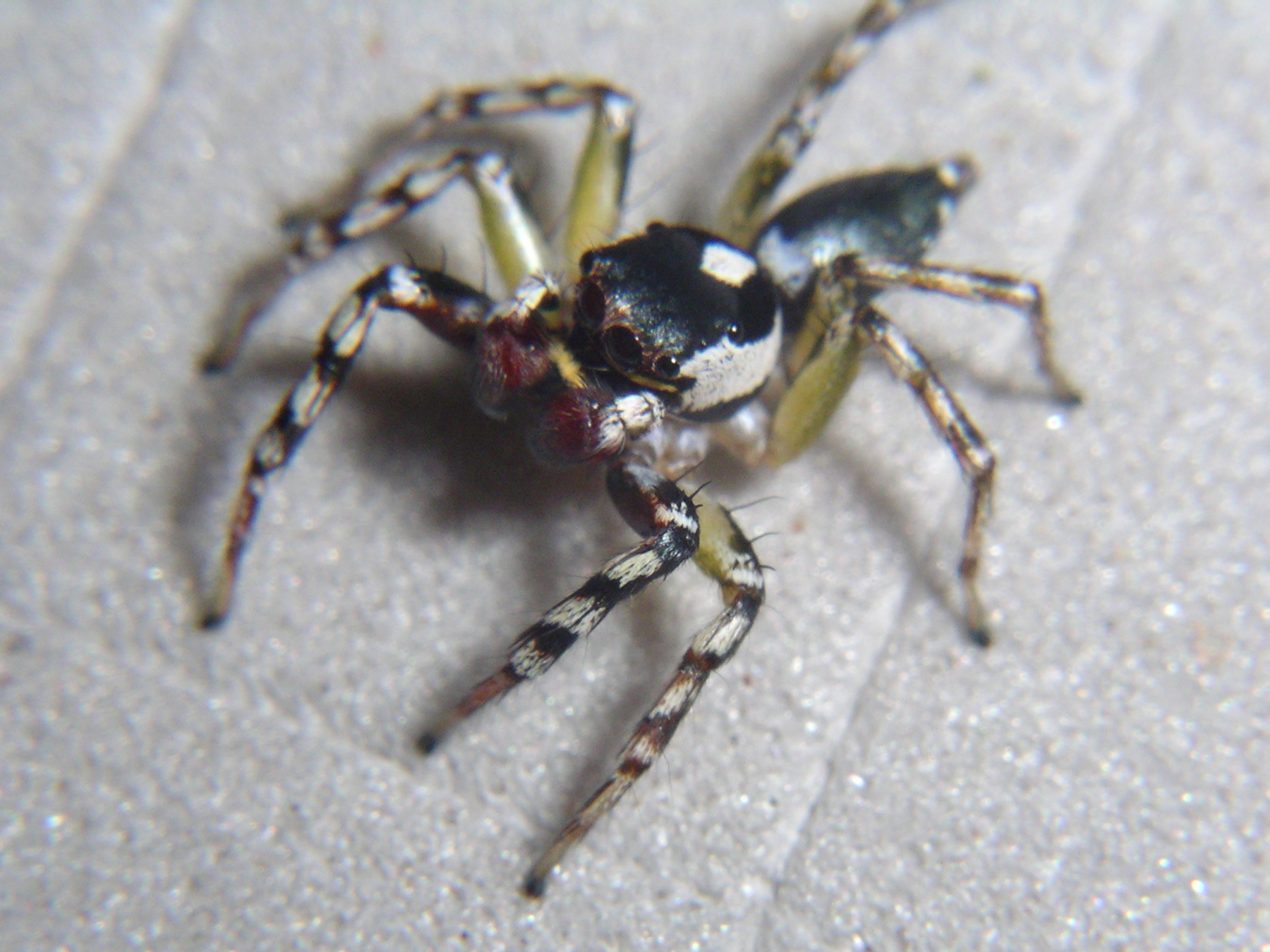
- Male Cytaea from Papua New Guinea

Scientific classification
- Kingdom: Animalia
- Phylum: Arthropoda
- Subphylum: Chelicerata
- Class: Arachnida
- Order: Araneae
- Infraorder: Araneomorphae
- Family: Salticidae
- Subfamily: Salticinae
- Genus: Cytaea; Keyserling, 1882

Type species
- Plexippus severus Thorell, 1881

Species
- See text.

= Cytaea =

Genus of spiders

Cytaea is a genus of spiders in the family Salticidae (jumping spiders).

Cytaea is also the Roman name of an ancient Colchic city, modern-day Kutaisi in Georgia.

== Species ==
- Cytaea aeneomicans Simon, 1902 – Lombok
- Cytaea albichelis Strand, 1911 – Kei Islands
- Cytaea albolimbata Simon, 1888 – Andaman Islands
- Cytaea argentosa (Thorell, 1881) – New Guinea
- Cytaea barbatissima (Keyserling, 1881) – Queensland, New South Wales
- Cytaea carolinensis Berry, Beatty & Prószyński, 1998 – Caroline Islands
- Cytaea catella (Thorell, 1891) – New Guinea
- Cytaea clarovittata (Keyserling, 1881) – New South Wales
- Cytaea dispalans (Thorell, 1892) – Java
- Cytaea fibula Berland, 1938 – New Hebrides
- Cytaea flavolineata Berland, 1938 – New Hebrides
- Cytaea frontaligera (Thorell, 1881) – New Guinea, Queensland
- Cytaea guentheri Thorell, 1895 – Burma
- Cytaea haematica Simon, 1902 – Java
- Cytaea haematicoides Strand, 1911 – Aru Islands
- Cytaea koronivia Berry, Beatty & Prószyński, 1998 – Fiji
- Cytaea laodamia Hogg, 1918 – New Guinea
- Cytaea laticeps (Thorell, 1878) – Amboina
- Cytaea lepida Kulczyński, 1910 – Solomon Islands
- Cytaea levii Peng & Li, 2002 – Taiwan
- Cytaea mitellata (Thorell, 1881) – New Guinea
- Cytaea morrisoni Dunn, 1951 – Western Australia
- Cytaea nausori Berry, Beatty & Prószyński, 1998 – Fiji
- Cytaea nigriventris (Keyserling, 1881) – Queensland
- Cytaea nimbata (Thorell, 1881) – New Guinea
- Cytaea oreophila Simon, 1902 – Java, Sumatra
- Cytaea piscula (L. Koch, 1867) – New South Wales, Samoa
  - Cytaea piscula subsiliens (Kulczyński, 1910) – Samoa, New South Wales
- Cytaea plumbeiventris (Keyserling, 1881) – New Guinea, Queensland
- Cytaea ponapensis Berry, Beatty & Prószyński, 1998 – Caroline Islands
- Cytaea rai Berry, Beatty & Prószyński, 1998 – Caroline Islands
- Cytaea rubra (Walckenaer, 1837) – New Guinea
- Cytaea severa (Thorell, 1881) – Queensland
- Cytaea sinuata (Doleschall, 1859) – Philippines to Australia
- Cytaea sylvia Hogg, 1915 – New Guinea
- Cytaea taveuniensis Patoleta & Gardzińska, 2010 – Fiji
- Cytaea trispinifera Marples, 1955 – Samoa
- Cytaea vitiensis Berry, Beatty & Prószyński, 1998 – Fiji
