= Vicirionessa occidentalis =

Scientific classification
- Kingdom: Animalia
- Phylum: Arthropoda
- Subphylum: Chelicerata
- Class: Arachnida
- Order: Araneae
- Infraorder: Araneomorphae
- Family: Salticidae
- Genus: Vicirionessa
- Species: V. occidentalis

Binomial name
- Vicirionessa occidentalis (Wesołowska & Russell-Smith, 2011)

Synonyms
- Brancus occidentalis Wesołowska & Russell-Smith, 2011

Species of jumping spider

Vicirionessa occidentalis is a jumping spider in the genus Vicirionessa that lives in Nigeria. The holotype was found near Ibadan. It is a small spider, typically with a dark yellow cephalothorax 3.1 mm (0.12 in) in length and a brown abdomen that is typically 3 mm (0.12 in) long. It can be distinguished from other spiders in the genus by its particularly elongated and narrow abdomen, measuring typically 1.4 mm (0.055 in) in width. The spider's eye field is brown to black. Its forelegs are light brown with yellow segments while its rear legs are yellow with only small parts darker. Its femora, leg hairs and spines are particularly long. Also noticeable are the clumps of hairs at the base of the spider's claws. The species was first described in 2011 by Anthony Russell-Smith and Wanda Wesołowska as Brancus occidentalis, who transferred it to their new genus Vicirionessa in 2022.

== Taxonomy and etymology ==
Vicirionessa occidentalis is a species of jumping spider, a member of the family Salticidae, that was first described in 2016 by the arachnologists Wanda Wesołowska and Anthony Russell-Smith. It is one of over 500 species identified by Wesołowska during her career. The spider was initially placed in the genus Brancus with the name Brancus occidentalis. Brancus had been circumscribed by Eugène Simon in 1902. In 2022, the Wesołowska and Russell-Smith recognised that Brancus was a junior synonym of the genus Thyene but that all the species needed to be allocated to other genera. To accommodate some of these, they circumscribed a new genus called Vicirionessa, a combination of the name Viciria and the ending nessa. The species name is Latin word for west and relates to its preference for the western part of Africa.

Vicirionessa is related to Evarcha and Hyllus. In 1976, Jerzy Prószyński placed the genera in the subfamily Pelleninae, along with the genera Bianor and Pellenes. In Wayne Maddison's 2015 study of spider phylogenetic classification, the genera Brancus, Evarcha and Hyllus were allocated to the subtribe Plexippina. Plexippinae and Pelleninae together make up the group Plexippoida. Plexippina is a member of the tribe Plexippini, in the subclade Simonida in the clade Saltafresia. Vicirionessa has a similar relationship.

== Description ==
Vicirionessa occidentalis is a brown spider with a rounded cephalothorax and a narrower elongated abdomen. Its body shape is unusual, particularly the narrowness of its abdomen. Its cephalothorax measures typically 3.1 mm (0.12 in) in length, 2.5 mm (0.098 in) in width and 1.2 mm (0.047 in) in height. The male's carapace, the hard upper side of the cephalothorax, is pear-shaped with the narrow part to the front. It is dark yellow, on top apart from the eye field, which is brown to black. Its margins are black with streaks of white hairs on its sides. Its sternum, or underside of the cephalothorax, is brownish. There are white hairs scattered on the lighter parts of the carapace and thin colourless bristles on the eye field. The eyes at the front in the middle are larger than the others and surrounded by dark brown scales. The spider's face, or clypeus, is low and brown. The spider's mouthparts, including its labium and maxillae, are also brownish and there is a single very small tooth in its chelicerae.

The spider's abdomen is similar in length but narrower and more elongated than the carapace, measuring 3 mm (0.12 in) long and 1.4 mm (0.055 in) wide. Its top is brown and has an indistinct marking of a lighter streak at the back. It is covered in thin delicate hairs. The underside of the abdomen has a distinctive wide stripe. The spider has dark spinneret. Its legs are unusual. The forelegs are light brown with yellow segments. The rear legs are yellow with only a limited number of smaller parts darker. The legs have unusually long femora. There are very long leg spines and long tin colourless leg hairs. It has pronounced clumps of hair at the base of its claws.

The spider's copulatory organs are unusual. It has yellow pedipalps that are generally hairless apart from a clump of long hairs on the palpal tibia. The tibia also has a shovel-like appendage, or tibial apophysis, that has a single spike. The cymbium is rounded and larger than the palpal bulb, which itself has a long embolus that comes out near the base of the bulb, loops around and then springs away from the bulb near the top. This long embolus as well as the shape of the tibial apophysis are particularly unusual in the genus. The female has not been identified.

== Distribution ==
Vicirionessa spiders are endemic to Africa. Vicirionessa occidentalis is endemic to Nigeria. The holotype was found in Ibadan in 1974.
