= Vicirionessa signata =

Scientific classification
- Kingdom: Animalia
- Phylum: Arthropoda
- Subphylum: Chelicerata
- Class: Arachnida
- Order: Araneae
- Infraorder: Araneomorphae
- Family: Salticidae
- Genus: Vicirionessa
- Species: V. signata

Binomial name
- Vicirionessa signata (Dawidowicz & Wesołowska, 2016)

Synonyms
- Brancus signatus Dawidowicz & Wesołowska, 2016

Species of jumping spider

Vicirionessa signata is a jumping spider in the genus Vicirionessa that lives in Ivory Coast and Kenya. It was first described in 2016 by Angelika Dawidowicz and Wanda Wesołowska as Brancus signatus and transferred by Anthony Russell-Smith and Wesołowska to their new genus Vicirionessa in 2022. The spider is small, with a cephalothorax that is typically 3.5 mm (0.14 in) and an abdomen typically 1.8 mm (0.071 in) long. Its carapace is mainly yellow, with a furrow-like fovea, apart from its darker eye field and reddish hairs near the spider's eyes. Its sternum is yellowish. Its abdomen is also mainly yellow with a pattern of light brown chevrons on top and small silver patches of guanine crystals underneath. The female has a pocket and two depressions in its epigyne and short seminal ducts. The male has not been described.

== Taxonomy and etymology ==
Vicirionessa signata is a species of jumping spider, a member of the family Salticidae, that was first described in 2016 by the arachnologists Angelika Dawidowicz and Wanda Wesołowska. It is one of over 500 species identified by Wesołowska during her career. The spider was initially placed in the genus Brancus with the name Brancus signatum. In 2022, Wesołowska and Anthony Russell-Smith recognised that Brancus was a junior synonym of the genus Thyene but that all the species needed to be allocated to other genera. To accommodate some of these, they circumscribed a new genus called Vicirionessa, a combination of the name Viciria and the ending nessa. The species name is Latin for marked, which is named for the two teardrop-shaped patches on the carapace.

Vicirionessa is related to Evarcha and Hyllus. In 1976, Jerzy Prószyński placed the genera in the subfamily Pelleninae, along with the genera Bianor and Pellenes. In Wayne Maddison's 2015 study of spider phylogenetic classification, the genera Brancus, Evarcha and Hyllus were allocated to the subtribe Plexippina. Plexippinae and Pelleninae together make up the group Plexippoida. Plexippina is a member of the tribe Plexippini, in the subclade Simonida in the clade Saltafresia. Vicirionessa has a similar relationship.

== Description ==
Vicirionessa signata is a light spider with a rounded cephalothorax and a narrower elongated abdomen. Its cephalothorax measures typically 3.5 mm (0.14 in) in length, 2.9 mm (0.11 in) in width and 1.8 mm (0.071 in) in height. The female's carapace, the hard upper side of the cephalothorax, is ovoid and high. It is yellowish apart from the eye field, which is darker, and two darker patches behind the eye field that are covered in reddish hairs. There are also small clumps of reddish hairs near some of the eyes. Some eyes are surrounded with black rings and light hairs. The majority of the carapace has a sparse covering of brown bristles while there are dense whitish hairs on the eye field and the edges of the carapace. There is a furrow-like fovea in the middle of the carapace. The spider's face, or clypeus, is high and has light hairs. Its sternum, or underside of the cephalothorax, is yellowish. The spider's mouthparts, including its labium and maxillae, are also yellowish and there is a single tooth in its chelicerae.

The spider's abdomen is smaller, only 1.8 mm long and 1.2 mm (0.047 in) wide. Its top is light yellow and covered in light hairs and longer brown bristles. There are markings of brownish chevrons in the middle, the back narrowing in an almost-conical fashion. The underside of the abdomen is lighter with small silver patches of crystals made of guanine. The spider has light spinneret and yellow legs. There are many dark brown leg spines. The spider's copulatory organs are unusual. Its epigyne, the external and most visible of its copulatory organs, has two depressions and a wide pocket at the back along the epigastric fold, or back edge. The edges of the depressions show strong signs of sclerotization. There are two copulatory openings that lead to short seminal ducts and spermathecae, or receptacles, that have multiple chambers. It is most similar to Vicirionessa peckhamorum, differing mainly in the shape and length of the seminal ducts. The male has not been identified.

== Distribution and habitat ==
Vicirionessa spiders are endemic to Africa. Vicirionessa signata has been identified living in Ivory Coast and Kenya. The holotype was found in Kenya in shrubs on the slope of Mount Elgon in 1948 at an altitude of 2,000 m (6,600 ft) above sea level. In the country, the spider has only been seen in the area around the mountain. In 2022, when Wesołowska and Anthony Russell-Smith were undertaking an assessment of a large collection of spiders brought by Jean-Claude Ledoux from Ivory Coast to France between August 1974 and January 1976, they discovered another example that originated in the Lamto Scientific Reserve in Ivory Coast.
