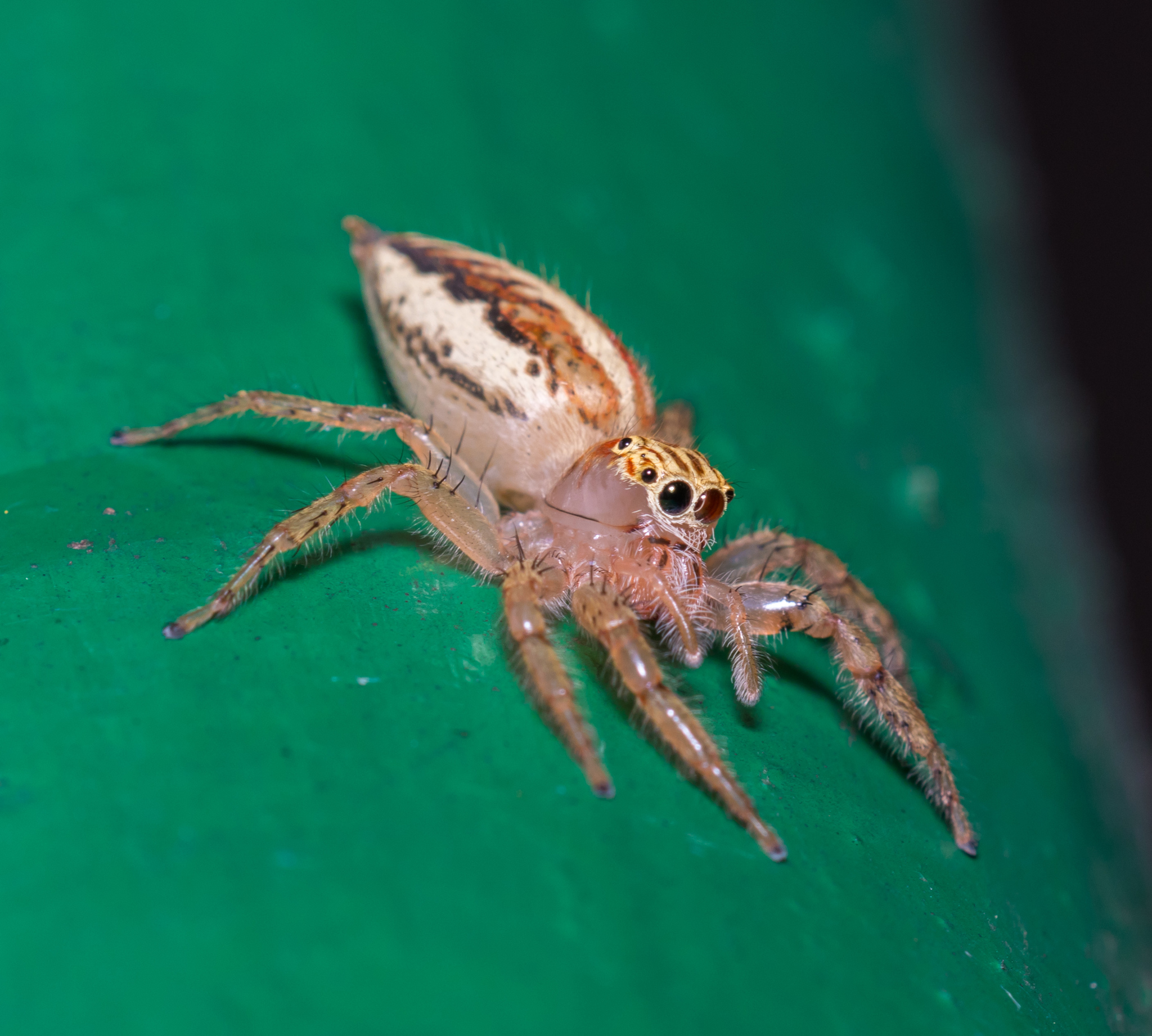
- female from Hong Kong
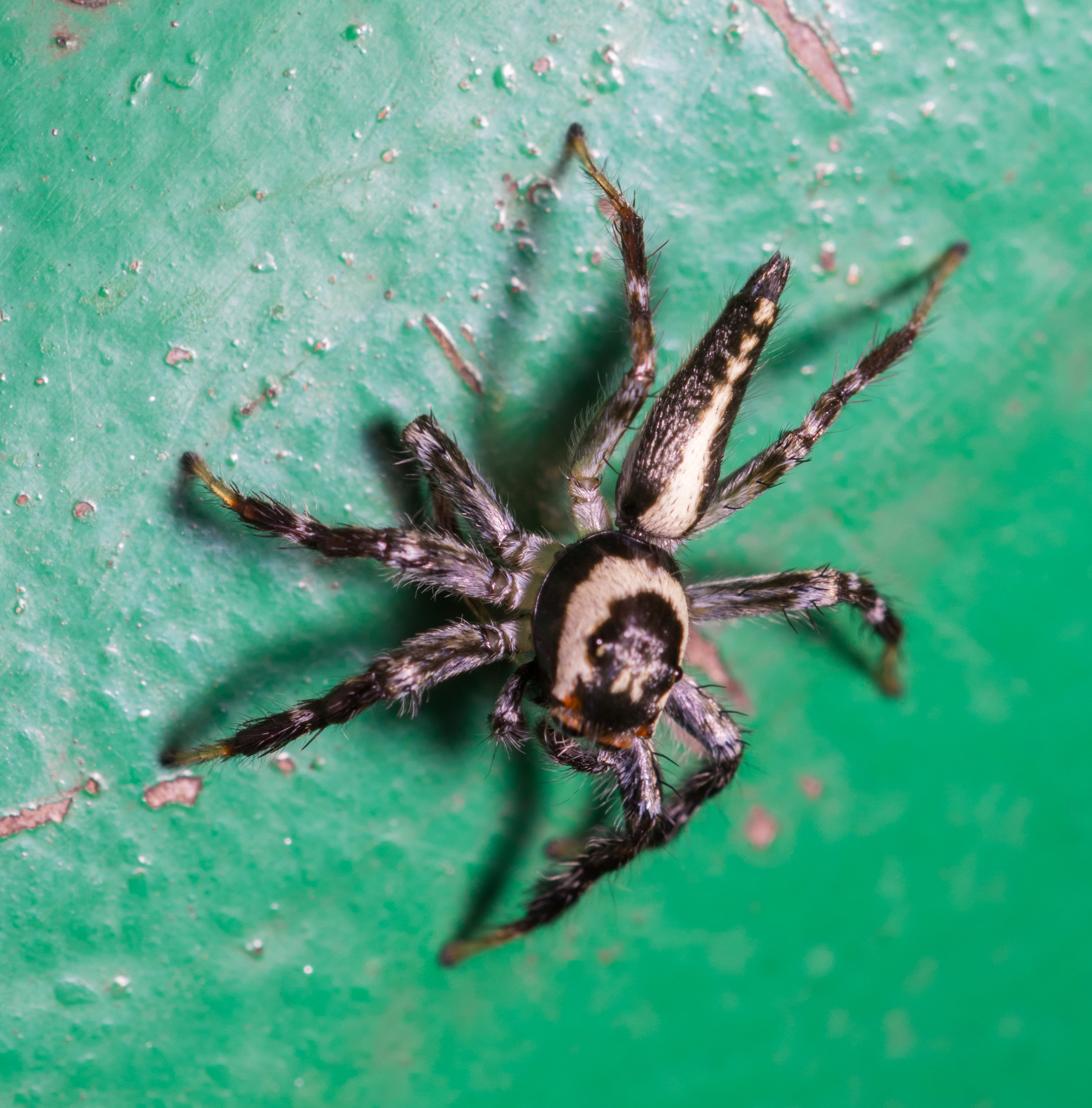
- male from Hong Kong

Scientific classification
- Kingdom: Animalia
- Phylum: Arthropoda
- Subphylum: Chelicerata
- Class: Arachnida
- Order: Araneae
- Infraorder: Araneomorphae
- Family: Salticidae
- Genus: Telamonia
- Species: T. festiva

Binomial name
- Telamonia festiva Thorell, 1887

Synonyms
- Viciria terebrifera Thorell, 1890; Bathippus trinotatus Thorell, 1895; Viciria signata Simon, 1899; Lyssomanes sikkimensis Tikader, 1967; Telamonia shepardi Barrion, Barrion-Dupo & Heong, 2013

= Telamonia festiva =

Species of jumping spider

Telamonia festiva is a species of jumping spider in the family Salticidae. It is widely distributed across South and Southeast Asia, from India to the Philippines.

== Taxonomy ==
The species was first described by Swedish arachnologist Tamerlan Thorell in 1887 based on a female specimen collected in Bhamo, Myanmar. Over time, several other species were described that were later determined to be synonymous with T. festiva. The most recent synonymization was that of Telamonia shepardi Barrion, Barrion-Dupo & Heong, 2013, which was synonymized by Lin and colleagues in 2023.

== Distribution ==
Telamonia festiva has a wide distribution across tropical Asia. It has been recorded from India, Sri Lanka, Nepal, China, Taiwan, Vietnam, Cambodia, Myanmar, Thailand, peninsular and Bornean Malaysia, Singapore, Indonesia (Sumatra, Java, Sulawesi), and the Philippines.

== Description ==
Telamonia festiva is readily recognized by the presence of a series of chevron-shaped markings along the length of the dorsal stripe on the opisthosoma (abdomen). The species exhibits sexual dimorphism in coloration and size.

Males are mostly black and white in coloration, without the elongated front legs that distinguish male Telamonia dimidiata. The retrolateral tibial apophysis (RTA) of males is sharply pointed. The original description noted males have a body length of approximately 7 millimeters.

Females vary in coloration but, in addition to the characteristic chevrons on the dorsal opisthosoma, typically display three stripes of white to off-white scales across the eye region. Thorell's original description of the female noted a body length of 11.5 millimeters, with a testaceous (yellowish-brown) cephalothorax marked with reddish spots, particularly between and behind the eyes. The abdomen is described as long and narrow, testaceous in color, covered with dense silky pale yellow pubescence and ornamented with two longitudinal black bands that are red-margined anteriorly.

== Habitat ==
This species is found in various habitats across its range, including tea plantations in the Dooars region of West Bengal, India.
