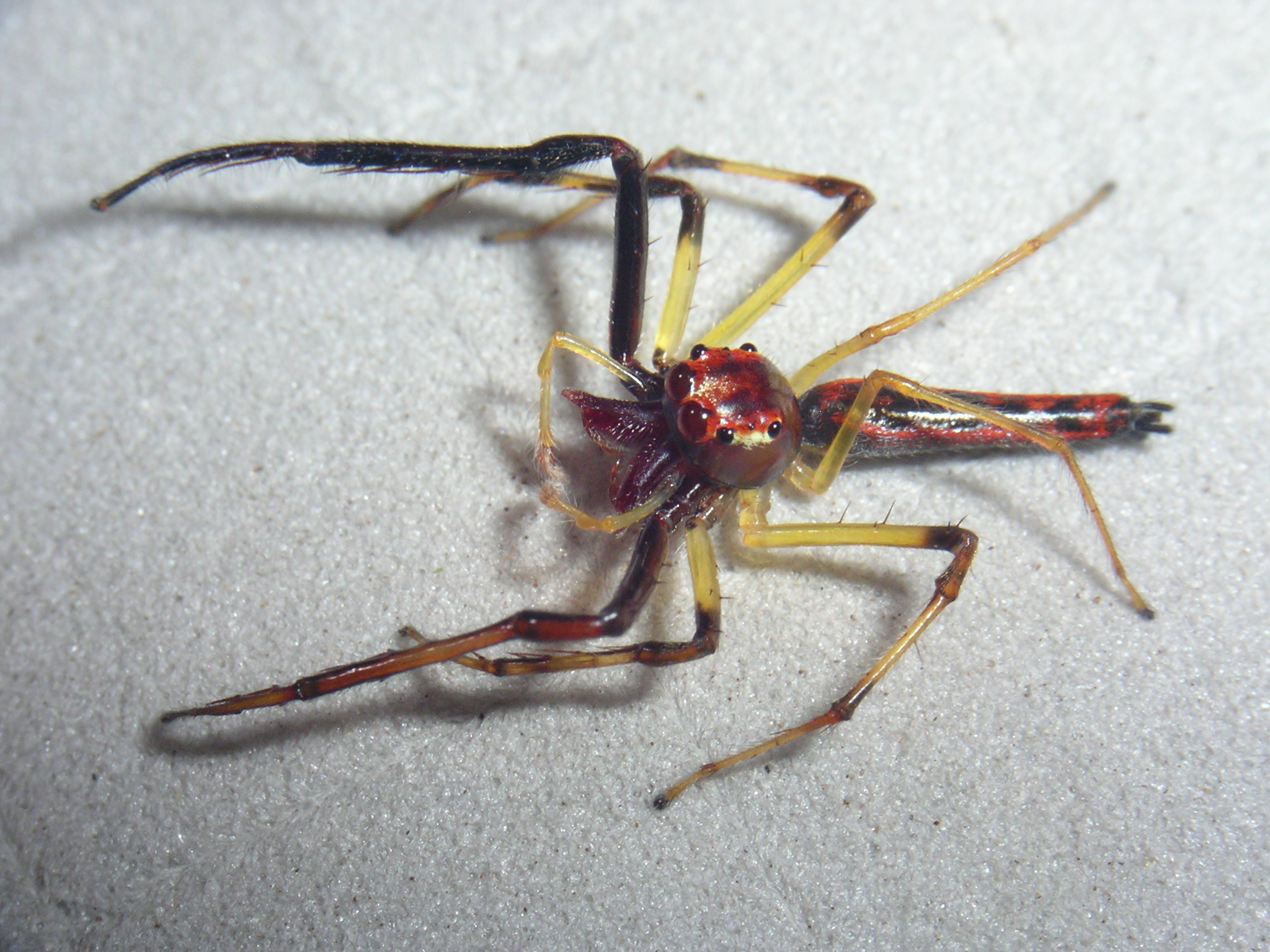
- Male V. praemandibularis
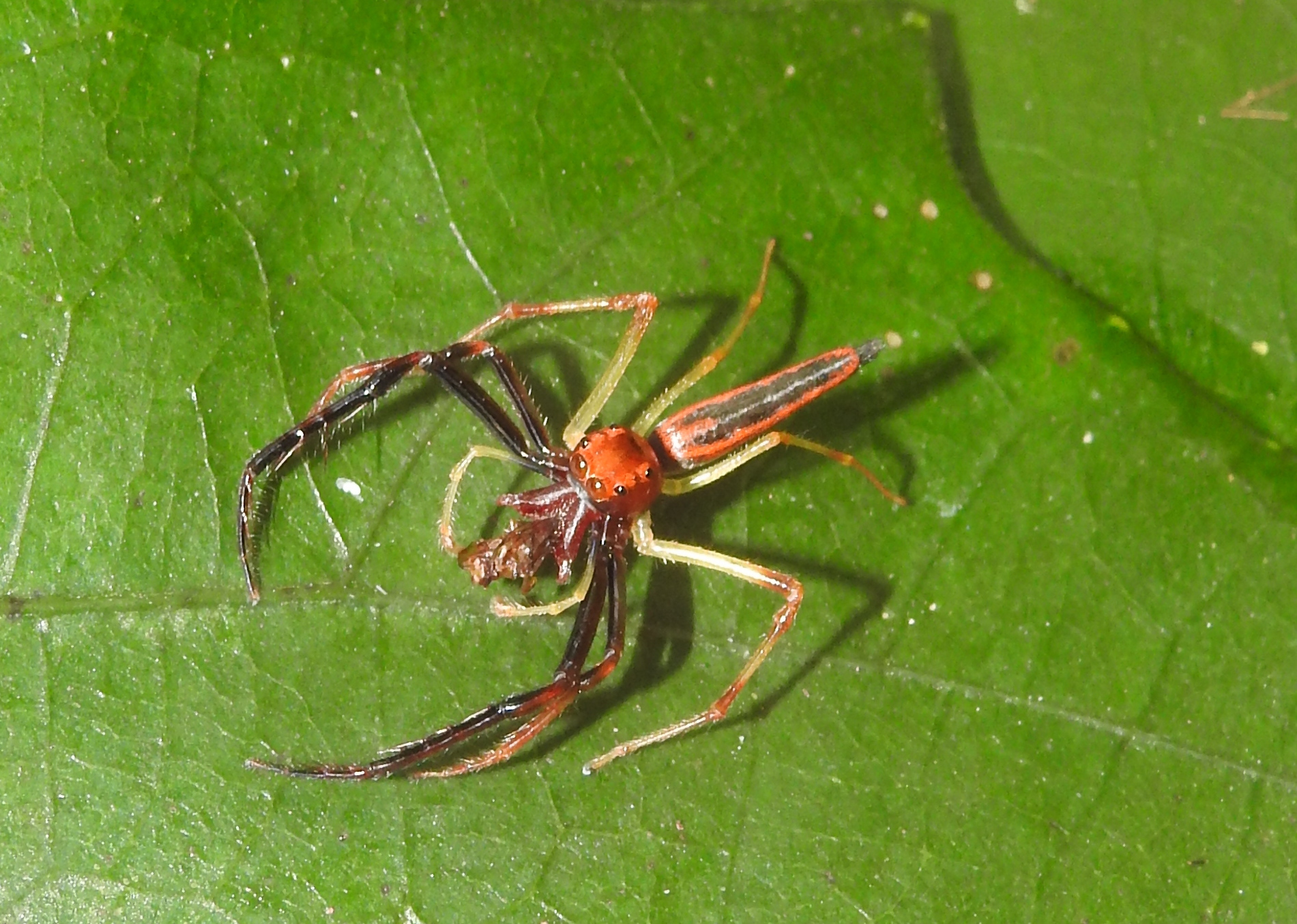
- V. pavesii

Scientific classification
- Kingdom: Animalia
- Phylum: Arthropoda
- Subphylum: Chelicerata
- Class: Arachnida
- Order: Araneae
- Infraorder: Araneomorphae
- Family: Salticidae
- Subfamily: Salticinae
- Genus: Viciria; Thorell, 1877

Type species
- V. pavesii Thorell, 1877

Species
- 21, see text

Synonyms
- Eupalia Simon, 1899; Eupalina Strand, 1932

= Viciria =

Genus of spiders

Viciria is a genus of jumping spiders that was first described by Tamerlan Thorell in 1877.

== Description ==
Both sexes reach a length of about 7 to 12 mm. Viciria is a colorful genus similar to Telamonia. However, the very long, thin opisthosoma of Viciria is almost cylindrical, and the color patterns differ. Viciria often shows a single broad longitudinal stripe with a pattern of black dashes on the opisthosoma. A white median stripe is present on the cephalus of the female.

== Distribution ==
Like Telamonia, Viciria is found in Africa and Asia.

== Species ==
As of October 2025, this genus includes 21 species:

- Viciria albolimbata Simon, 1885 – Indonesia (Sumatra)
- Viciria arrogans G. W. Peckham & E. G. Peckham, 1907 – Malaysia (Borneo)
- Viciria chrysophaea Simon, 1903 – Gabon
- Viciria concolor G. W. Peckham & E. G. Peckham, 1907 – Malaysia (Borneo)
- Viciria detrita Strand, 1922 – Indonesia (Sumatra)
- Viciria diademata Simon, 1902 – India
- Viciria epileuca Simon, 1903 – Gabon
- Viciria flavipes G. W. Peckham & E. G. Peckham, 1903 – South Africa
- Viciria flavolimbata Simon, 1909 – Guinea-Bissau
- Viciria lucida G. W. Peckham & E. G. Peckham, 1907 – Malaysia (Borneo)
- Viciria minima Reimoser, 1934 – India
- Viciria miranda G. W. Peckham & E. G. Peckham, 1907 – Malaysia (Borneo)
- Viciria moesta G. W. Peckham & E. G. Peckham, 1907 – Malaysia (Borneo)
- Viciria pallens Thorell, 1877 – Indonesia (Sulawesi)
- Viciria paludosa G. W. Peckham & E. G. Peckham, 1907 – Malaysia (Borneo)
- Viciria pavesii Thorell, 1877 – Thailand, Malaysia, Singapore, Indonesia (type species)
- Viciria petulans G. W. Peckham & E. G. Peckham, 1907 – Malaysia (Borneo)
- Viciria polysticta Simon, 1902 – Sri Lanka
- Viciria rhinoceros van Hasselt, 1894 – Indonesia (Sulawesi)
- Viciria scintillans Simon, 1909 – West Africa
- Viciria semicoccinea Simon, 1902 – Indonesia (Java)

=== Transitions ===
Following species were transferred to other genera.

- Viciria alba - to Evarcha
- Viciria albocincta - to Vicirionessa
- Viciria alboguttata - to Epeus
- Viciria besanconi - to Vicirionessa
- Viciria bombycina - to Telamonia
- Viciria caprina - to Telamonia
- Viciria chabanaudi - to Vicirionessa
- Viciria diatreta - to Proszynskia
- Viciria dimidiata - to Telamonia
- Viciria elegans - to Telamonia
- Viciria equestris - to Vicirionessa
- Viciria flavobilineata - to Epeus
- Viciria flavocincta - to Evarcha
- Viciria formosa - to Telamonia
- Viciria fuscimana - to Vicirionessa
- Viciria hasselti - to Telamonia
- Viciria jeanneli - to Malloneta
- Viciria lawrencei - to Hyllus
- Viciria longiuscula - to Hyllus
- Viciria lupula - to Thyene
- Viciria mondoni - to Malloneta
- Viciria monodi - to Vicirionessa
- Viciria morigera - to Vicirionessa
- Viciria mustela - to Vicirionessa
- Viciria niveimana - to Vicirionessa
- Viciria ocellata - to Thyene
- Viciria parmata - to Vicirionessa
- Viciria peckhamorum - to Vicirionessa
- Viciria prenanti - to Vicirionessa
- Viciria signata - to Telamonia
- Viciria sponsa - to Telamonia
- Viciria tener - to Epeus
- Viciria terebrifera - to Telamonia
- Viciria tergina - to Vicirionessa
- Viciria thoracica - to Hyllus
- Viciria viciriaeformis - to Thyene
