= Vicirionessa fuscimana =

Scientific classification
- Kingdom: Animalia
- Phylum: Arthropoda
- Subphylum: Chelicerata
- Class: Arachnida
- Order: Araneae
- Infraorder: Araneomorphae
- Family: Salticidae
- Genus: Vicirionessa
- Species: V. fuscimana

Binomial name
- Vicirionessa fuscimana (Simon, 1903)

Synonyms
- Viciria fuscimana Simon, 1903; Brancus fuscimanus (Simon, 1903); Brancus lacrimosus Wesołowska & Edwards, 2008; Telamonia fuscimana (Simon, 1903)

Species of spider

Vicirionessa fuscimana is a jumping spider species that lives in Sierra Leone, Ivory Coast, Nigeria, Cameroon, Equatorial Guinea and was first described by Eugène Simon in 1903 as Viciria fuscimana.
