= Telamonia elegans =

Scientific classification
- Kingdom: Animalia
- Phylum: Arthropoda
- Subphylum: Chelicerata
- Class: Arachnida
- Order: Araneae
- Infraorder: Araneomorphae
- Family: Salticidae
- Genus: Telamonia
- Species: T. elegans

Binomial name
- Telamonia elegans (Thorell, 1887)

Synonyms
- Viciria elegans Thorell, 1887

Species of jumping spider

Telamonia elegans is a species of jumping spider in the family Salticidae. It was originally described as Viciria elegans by Thorell in 1887 and later transferred to the genus Telamonia by Prószyński in 1984.

== Distribution ==
T. elegans is distributed across Southeast Asia, with confirmed records from Myanmar (including Tharrawaddy), Vietnam, and Indonesia (Sumatra).

== Description ==
The species shows sexual dimorphism typical of jumping spiders, with males and females differing in size and coloration.

=== Male ===
Adult males measure approximately 8 mm in total length, with the cephalothorax measuring about 3.5 mm in length and 2.5 mm in width. The cephalothorax is testaceous (yellowish-brown) with a broad black marginal band and distinctive red pubescence between the eyes on each side. The clypeus is black with white hairs along the margin.

The front legs are darker, with femora, patellae and tibiae appearing blackish with a bluish tint, while the metatarsi and tarsi are testaceous except for black tips. The third and fourth pairs of legs are lighter, being mostly testaceous. The front legs bear distinctive fringes of long, dense hairs on the underside of the femora and patellae.

The abdomen is subtestaceous above and on the sides, decorated with two narrow longitudinal red bands formed by pubescence, with yellow pubescence between them and whitish pubescence elsewhere. The underside is black.

=== Female ===
Females are larger than males, reaching approximately 10 mm in total length. The cephalothorax measures about 4.5 mm in length and 3.25 mm in width. Females have a less contrasting coloration pattern compared to males, with the red markings on the cephalothorax sometimes being obsolete. The longitudinal red bands on the abdomen may also be reduced or absent in some specimens.

The epigynum consists of two small, round, dark pits separated by a space smaller than their diameter.

== Taxonomy ==
The species was first described by Thorell in 1887 based on a juvenile male specimen collected at Bhamò, Myanmar. Thorell provided a more complete description in 1895 including adult males and females from additional localities. The species was transferred from Viciria to Telamonia by Prószyński in 1984 based on morphological characters.
