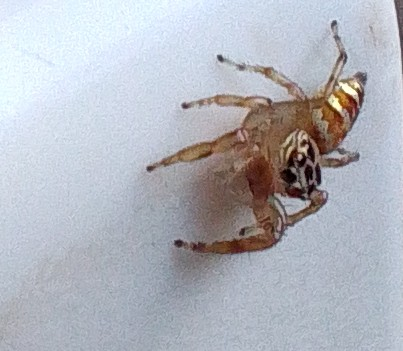
- T. natalii female from South Africa

Scientific classification
- Kingdom: Animalia
- Phylum: Arthropoda
- Subphylum: Chelicerata
- Class: Arachnida
- Order: Araneae
- Infraorder: Araneomorphae
- Family: Salticidae
- Genus: Thyene
- Species: T. natalii

Binomial name
- Thyene natalii Peckham & Peckham, 1903

= Thyene natalii =

Species of spider

Thyene natalii is a species of jumping spider in the genus Thyene that has a wide distribution in Southern and East Africa.

== Description ==
The species was originally described and differentiated from other species of Thyene in South Africa by Peckham & Peckham. The key to the species emphasised the crosswise bands marking the abdomen on males and females. Thyene natalii is between 5 and 8 mm (0.2 and 0.3 in) in length with an ovoid abdomen. The eye field takes up approximately half of the cephalothorax with roughly equidistant sides. The eyes are in three rows, with the first four eyes making up the anterior row and the second and third rows each comprising two eyes. The middle two eyes of the anterior row are almost twice the size of the lateral pair. The second row is closer to the first row and the third row is somewhat narrower than the cephalothorax.

Thyene natalii is the only species in the genus where both sexes have the abdomen decorated with crosswise scales. In the initial description of the species, the bands were described as being the same for both sexes: a series of lustrous silver scales and bright red hairs, but the source specimens were worn. A later description derived from studying live specimens, differentiates the male and female decoration. The male decoration is described as bands consisting of scales and being red and silver in colour, whereas the female decoration is described as bands consisting of metallic to brown and white scales.

In the male, the cephalic part is dark brown and there is a medium dark tan coloured band around the sides and back.The eye region is marked by metallic scales and the face region has three lines of reddish scales. There is a cluster of black hairs behind the lateral eyes. Males are distinguished by having sturdy front legs, which are also the longest.

The cephalothorax of the female was first described as being similar to the male except that the colour of the cephalic part is light brown and that the cluster of black hairs are absent. A later description again states the colour of the cephalic part as light brown, but adds a cluster of black hairs behind the anterior eyes. Females are distinguished by having sturdy front legs, but the third and fourth legs are the longest.

== Range ==
Thyene natalii has a distribution throughout Eastern and Southern Africa. In Eastern Africa it has been observed in Ethiopia, Tanzania, Madagascar and Kenya. In Southern Africa it has been observed Mozambique, Zimbabwe, Eswatini and South Africa.

== Habitat ==
In South Africa, Thyene natalii has been found in all of the country's more verdant floral biomes as well as in several agricultural systems.

== Taxonomy ==
Thyene natalii was first described from specimens collected from Durban in Natal, South Africa. Caporiacco used the name Thyene strandi for specimens from Ethiopia. Thyene strandi was later accepted as a synonym for Thyene natalii by Wesołowska.
