= Vicirionessa mustela =

- A South African Vicirionessa mustela

Scientific classification
- Kingdom: Animalia
- Phylum: Arthropoda
- Subphylum: Chelicerata
- Class: Arachnida
- Order: Araneae
- Infraorder: Araneomorphae
- Family: Salticidae
- Genus: Vicirionessa
- Species: V. mustela

Binomial name
- Vicirionessa mustela (Simon, 1902)

Species of spider

Vicirionessa mustela is a species of jumping spider that lives in Angola, Zimbabwe, Mozambique and South Africa.
