= Viciria polysticta =

Scientific classification
- Kingdom: Animalia
- Phylum: Arthropoda
- Subphylum: Chelicerata
- Class: Arachnida
- Order: Araneae
- Infraorder: Araneomorphae
- Family: Salticidae
- Genus: Viciria
- Species: V. polysticta

Binomial name
- Viciria polysticta Simon, 1902

Species of spider

Viciria polysticta is a species of jumping spider in the genus Viciria. It is endemic to Sri Lanka.

== Etymology ==
The species name polysticta is derived from Greek πολύς + στικτός, meaning "many-spotted" or "with many dots", referring to the spotted pattern described in the original description.

== Taxonomy ==
Viciria polysticta was first described by Eugène Simon in 1902 based on a male specimen from Sri Lanka, then known as Ceylon. The species belongs to the genus Viciria, which was established by Tamerlan Thorell in 1877.

== Description ==
V. polysticta is a small jumping spider with males reaching approximately 6 millimeters in length. Like other members of the genus Viciria, the species has a very long, thin opisthosoma that is almost cylindrical in shape.

Based on the original Latin description, the male has a dark brownish-reddish cephalothorax with pale posterior regions and distinctive white-spotted markings on the anterior part of the cephalic region that form a very broad transverse band. The abdomen is narrow and tapered, brownish-reddish above with parallel white markings on both sides. The chelicerae are nearly black with bronze-tinted appearance.

== Distribution and habitat ==
V. polysticta is endemic to Sri Lanka and has been recorded only from this island nation. No specific habitat information has been published for this species. There are no records of this species since its 1902 description.
