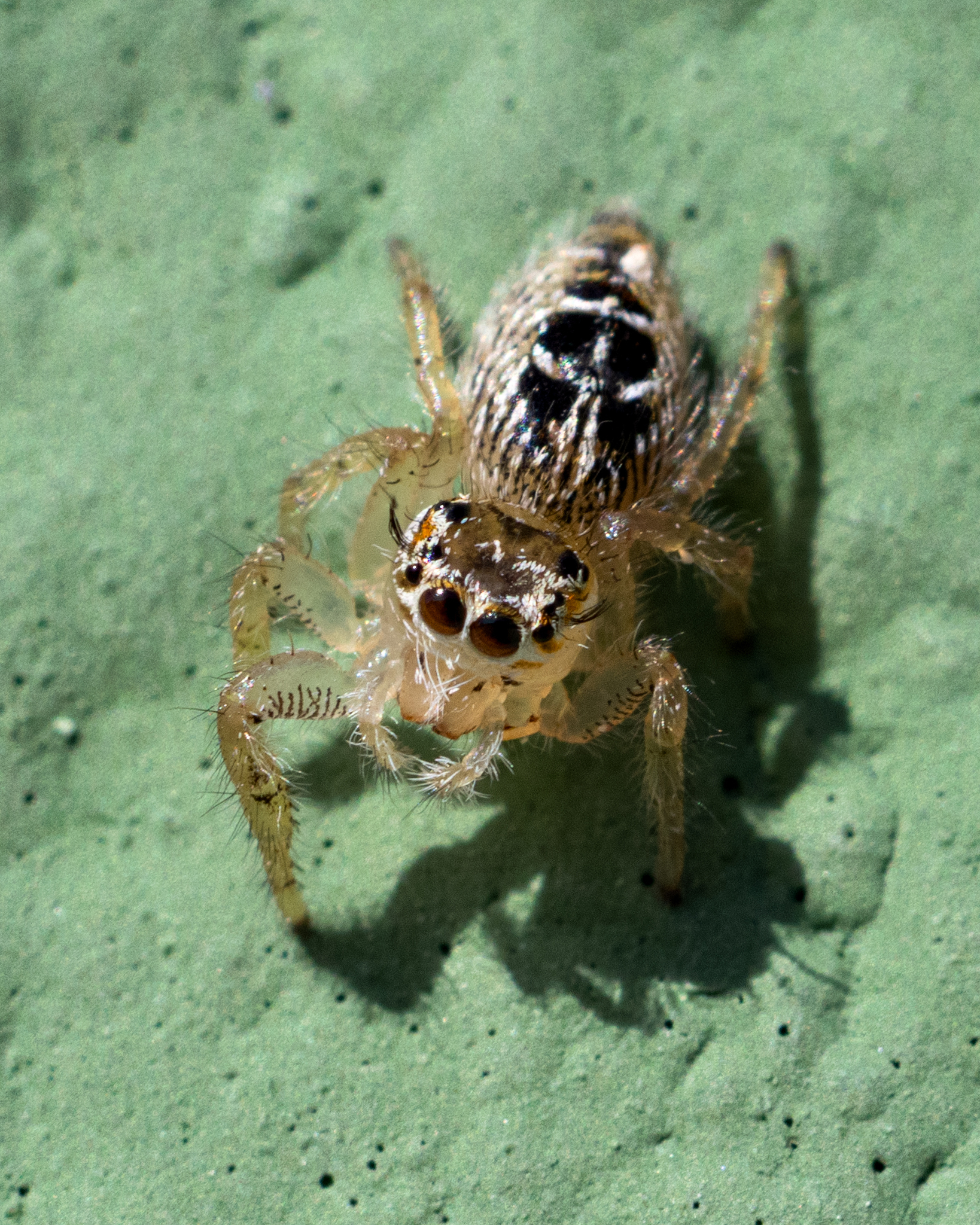
- Female
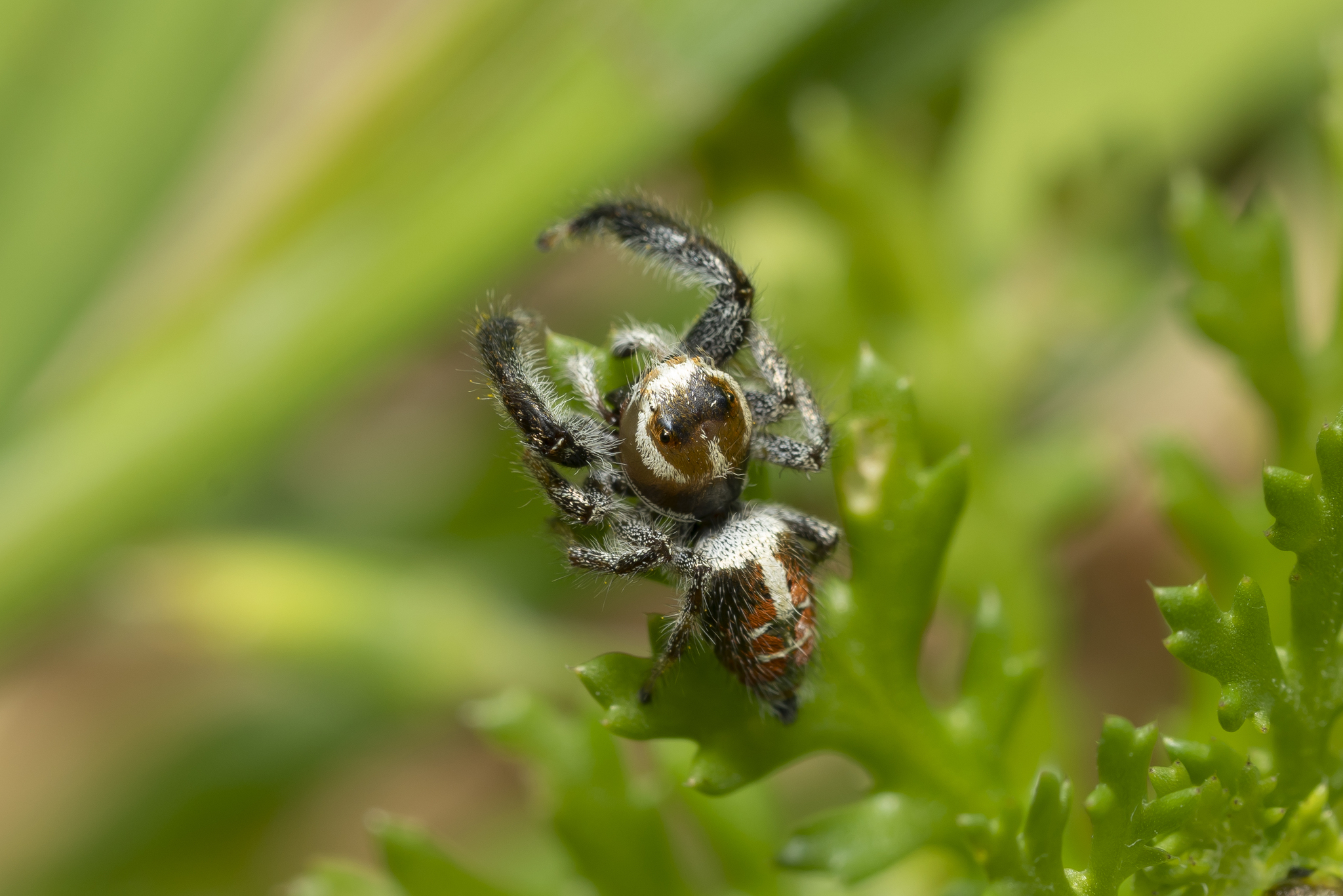
- Male

Scientific classification
- Kingdom: Animalia
- Phylum: Arthropoda
- Subphylum: Chelicerata
- Class: Arachnida
- Order: Araneae
- Infraorder: Araneomorphae
- Family: Salticidae
- Genus: Thyene
- Species: T. imperialis

Binomial name
- Thyene imperialis (Rossi, 1846)

= Thyene imperialis =

Species of jumping spider

Thyene imperialis is a species of jumping spider in the genus Thyene that have a wide distribution, being found across Southern Europe, North Africa and Asia, as far east as Indonesia. The spider lives in cultivated land, among cereal crops and cotton, and is being looked at as a possible biological pest control. It is a medium-sized spider with a flat carapace that is typically between 2.65 and 3.25 mm (0.104 and 0.128 in) long and an ovoid abdomen that is typically between 2.7 and 3.3 mm (0.11 and 0.13 in) long. The spider has 'horns' formed of black hairs on the side of its eye field and white scales on its clypeus. The female has a sandy carapace, the male being yellow, both having a pattern on their abdomen, although this varies between individual spiders. Its chelicerae have two small teeth to the front and one to the back. The spider has distinctive copulatory organs, with the male have a coiled embolus and the female a small white rectangular groove in its epigyne.

== Taxonomy ==
Thyene imperialis is a species of jumping spider, a member of the family Salticidae, that was first described by the arachnologist Pietro Rossi in 1846. He originally placed the species in the genus Attus with the name Attus imperialis and it was not until 1897 that it was given its current name. The original description was based on eight individuals that came from a range of places, including Corfu, Sicily and Spain. The genus Thyene was circumscribed by Eugène Simon in 1885. The newly named Thyene imperialis was made the type species for the new genus.

The genus Thyene was placed in the subtribe Plexippina in the tribe Plexippini by Wayne Maddison in 2015. These were allocated to the clade Simonida. In 2017, Jerzy Prószyński grouped the genus with 39 other genera of jumping spiders under the name Hyllines. The spider is known under different names, including Thyene lindbergi and Thyene sinensis.

== Description ==
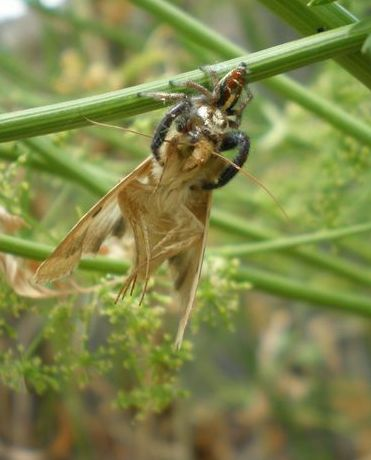
Thyene imperialis feeding on a moth

Thyene imperialis is a medium-sized spider. Its body is divided into two main parts: a rounded rhomboid cephalothorax and a thinner more oval abdomen. The male spider has a yellow carapace, the hard topside of the cephalothorax, that measures between 2.65 and 3.25 mm (0.104 and 0.128 in) in length and between 2.2 and 2.9 mm (0.087 and 0.114 in) in width. It is rather flat and wide, covered in white hairs and a few brown bristles, with a brown edge and fawn eye field. There are black markings and long white hairs around the eyes themselves. The pattern on the carapace varies between spiders, but can include a pale whitish-yellow semi-crescent towards the front and white scales on the rear edge. There are characteristic "horns" of black hairs on each side of the eye field. The front of the spider is yellowish-fawn with a blackish-brown lower part of the clypeus, or face, that has a scattering of white scales visible. The pedipalps are light brown and have a few small white rounded scales. The mouthparts, including the chelicerae, labium and maxillae, are generally brown. There are two small teeth to the front and one to the back. The maxillae have whitish tips. The underside of the cephalothorax, or sternum, is black with prominent dark hairs and bristles.

The male spider's abdomen is similar in length to the carapace but narrower, typically between 2.7 and 3.3 mm (0.11 and 0.13 in) long and between 1.7 and 2 mm (0.067 and 0.079 in) wide. It is brownish-russet with darker edges. The back of the top has a pattern of three white narrow patches on a dark brown or black background and there are a few scattered brown and russet hairs, with white hairs on some examples near the front. The underside of the abdomen is dark with white edges. The spider has dark brown spinnerets and brownish-black legs. The front legs are bigger than the rest and all have very long and bushy black and brown hairs and brown spines. Some of the legs have orange sections. The spider's copulatory organs include a cymbium that is brown with white tips. The round palpal bulb has an embolus that has two tight coils, a small flap near the top and a simple spike on the palpal tibia, or tibial apophysis.

The female is similar to the male, with a light sandy carapace that is typically between 2.9 and 3.25 in length and between 2.1 and 2.6 mm (0.083 and 0.102 in) in width. It has a slightly darker eye field with darker hairs and bristles than the male. Its sternum is light beige with a serrated black edge and a scattering of a few dark bristles. Its clypeus has prominent white scales and its chelicerae, labium and maxillae are light orange. It has a larger abdomen than the male, typically between 3.2 and 4.9 mm (0.13 and 0.19 in) long and between 2.2 and 3.2 wide. Some are orange on top with beige stripes that run from the front to the back and a pattern of a four short white lines in a black spot and a white surround to a black band in the middle. The underside of its abdomen is light beige and has black stripes that run along it, although they do not reach the front or back. Its legs are also beige with obvious dark hairs. Other examples have a pattern of dark square spots and a central spot that is lined by two narrow streaks at the front, a thin dark streak in the middle and white spots at the rear. The rear of the abdomen has a yellow area, small white lines and a darker triangular area and the underside is whitish with grey lines. Others have various similar patterns, some more intense than others.

The female's epigyne, the external visible part of its copulatory organs, is yellow and shows small signs of sclerotization. It has a small white rectangular groove that is membranous, out of the edge of which run two copulatory channels, which also show slight sclerotization. These then run to the rear and turn into a complicated flat spiral, accessory gland. The spermathecae have many chambers and show significant sclerotization.

== Distribution and habitat ==
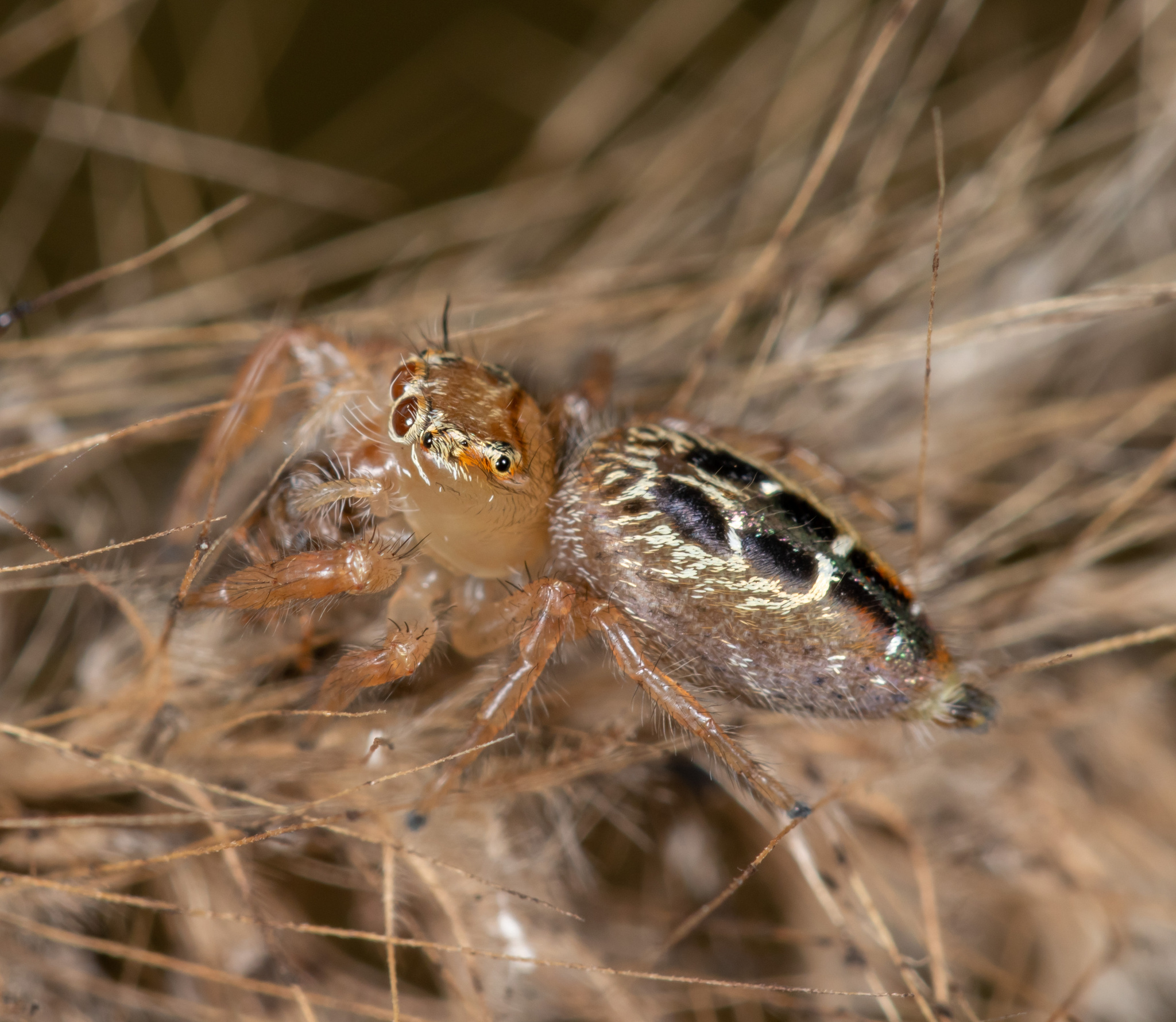
A female from Thailand

Thyene imperialis is widely distributed in Southern Europe, North and East Africa, across the Middle East to Central Asia and beyond, into China, India and Pakistan, with the species range extending to Indonesia. In Africa, it has been observed in countries like Burkina Faso, Guinea, Ivory Coast, Mali and Sudan. It is the only member of the genus that has been found in Italy. It has also been observed in Iran and Turkmenistan. In 2025, it was reported as a non-native species in the UK.

Thyene imperialis is often found in cultivated rather than uncultivated areas and has been found amongst cereal crops and olive groves. The spider eats a wide range of flies and other pests and its use as in biological pest control is being explored to protect a range of crops, including cotton.
