= Thyene masindi =

Scientific classification
- Kingdom: Animalia
- Phylum: Arthropoda
- Subphylum: Chelicerata
- Class: Arachnida
- Order: Araneae
- Infraorder: Araneomorphae
- Family: Salticidae
- Genus: Thyene
- Species: T. masindi

Binomial name
- Thyene masindi Wiśniewski & Wesołowska, 2024

Species of spider

Thyene masindi is a species of jumping spider in the genus Thyene that lives in Uganda. It was first described in 2024.
