= Thyene similis =

Scientific classification
- Kingdom: Animalia
- Phylum: Arthropoda
- Subphylum: Chelicerata
- Class: Arachnida
- Order: Araneae
- Infraorder: Araneomorphae
- Family: Salticidae
- Genus: Thyene
- Species: T. similis

Binomial name
- Thyene similis Wesołowska & van Harten, 2002

Jumping spider species in the genus Thyene

Thyene similis is a species of jumping spider that is endemic to Yemen, found only on Socotra Island. A member of the genus Thyene , it is a small spider, typically 6.4 mm (0.25 in) in length. It is generally brownish-red, apart from a black area near its eyes and a pattern of a white stripe and golden patches on its abdomen. There are also white streaks near its eyes. Its mouthparts, including its chelicerae, labium and maxillae, spinnerets and legs are generally brown. Only the male has so far been described. Its copulatory organs are similar to others spiders in the genus. It has a single thin projection, or tibial apophysis, on the palpal tibia and a round palpal bulb that terminates in a long thin embolus.

== Taxonomy ==
Thyene similis is a jumping spider that was first described by Wanda Wesołowska and Antonius van Harten in 2002. They allocated the species to the genus Thyene, first circumscribed by Eugène Simon in 1885. The spider's specific name is a Latin word meaning 'similar' and relates to the similarity between this species and others in the genus. The genus Thyene was placed in the subtribe Plexippina in the tribe Plexippini by Wayne Maddison in 2015. These were allocated to the subclade Simonida in the clade Saltafresia. In 2017, Jerzy Prószyński grouped the genus with 39 other genera of jumping spiders under the name Hyllines.

== Description ==
Thyene similis is a small spider, typical of the genus. The male has a carapace, the hard upper side of the front section of its body, that is a distinctive shape, a flat elongated oval measuring typically 2.9 mm (0.11 in) long and 2.4 mm (0.094 in) wide. Its thorax is brownish-red and covered in long brown hairs apart from a white streak running down the middle of its thorax. The areas around its eyes is black with white streaks next to its eyes and running under the foremost row of eyes. The part of the underside of the spider known as its sternum is brown. Its mouthparts, including its chelicerae, labium and maxillae, are also brown but there are pale tips at the end of its maxillae.

The spider's abdomen is an oval that is longer and narrower than its carapace, tapering to the rear. It is typically 3.5 mm (0.14 in) long and 1.6 mm (0.063 in) wide. Its upper side is brownish-red with a white stripe running down the middle of its front half and, behind that, six large patches that are golden and paired in a symmetrical pattern. This pattern helps to distinguish the species from others in the genus. It is covered in long, dense brownish hairs. The under side of its abdomen is darker than the upper side. Its spinnerets and legs are brown. The foremost legs are longer, thicker and hairier than the others.

The male spider's copulatory organs are very similar to others in the genus. There is a single thin projection, or tibial apophysis, on the palpal tibia that points parallel to a simple oval cymbium that has white hairs at its tip. Its palpal bulb is circular with a long thin embolus is projecting near the top. The female has not been described.

== Distribution ==
Thyene spiders can be found across Afro-Eurasia and the Eastern hemisphere. Thyene similis is endemic to Yemen. The species has limited distribution. The holotype was found on Socotra Island during 2000. It has not been found in any other areas of the country.
