= Thyene ornata =

Scientific classification
- Kingdom: Animalia
- Phylum: Arthropoda
- Subphylum: Chelicerata
- Class: Arachnida
- Order: Araneae
- Infraorder: Araneomorphae
- Family: Salticidae
- Genus: Thyene
- Species: T. ornata

Binomial name
- Thyene ornata Wesołowska & Tomasiewicz, 2008

Species of spider

Thyene ornata is a jumping spider species in the genus Thyene. The male was first identified in 2008.

== Distribution ==
Thyene ornata has been found in Ethiopia.
