= Telamonia sponsa =

Scientific classification
- Kingdom: Animalia
- Phylum: Arthropoda
- Subphylum: Chelicerata
- Class: Arachnida
- Order: Araneae
- Infraorder: Araneomorphae
- Family: Salticidae
- Genus: Telamonia
- Species: T. sponsa

Binomial name
- Telamonia sponsa (Simon, 1902)

Synonyms
- Viciria sponsa Simon, 1902

Species of spider

Telamonia sponsa is a species of spider of the genus Telamonia. It is endemic to Sri Lanka.
