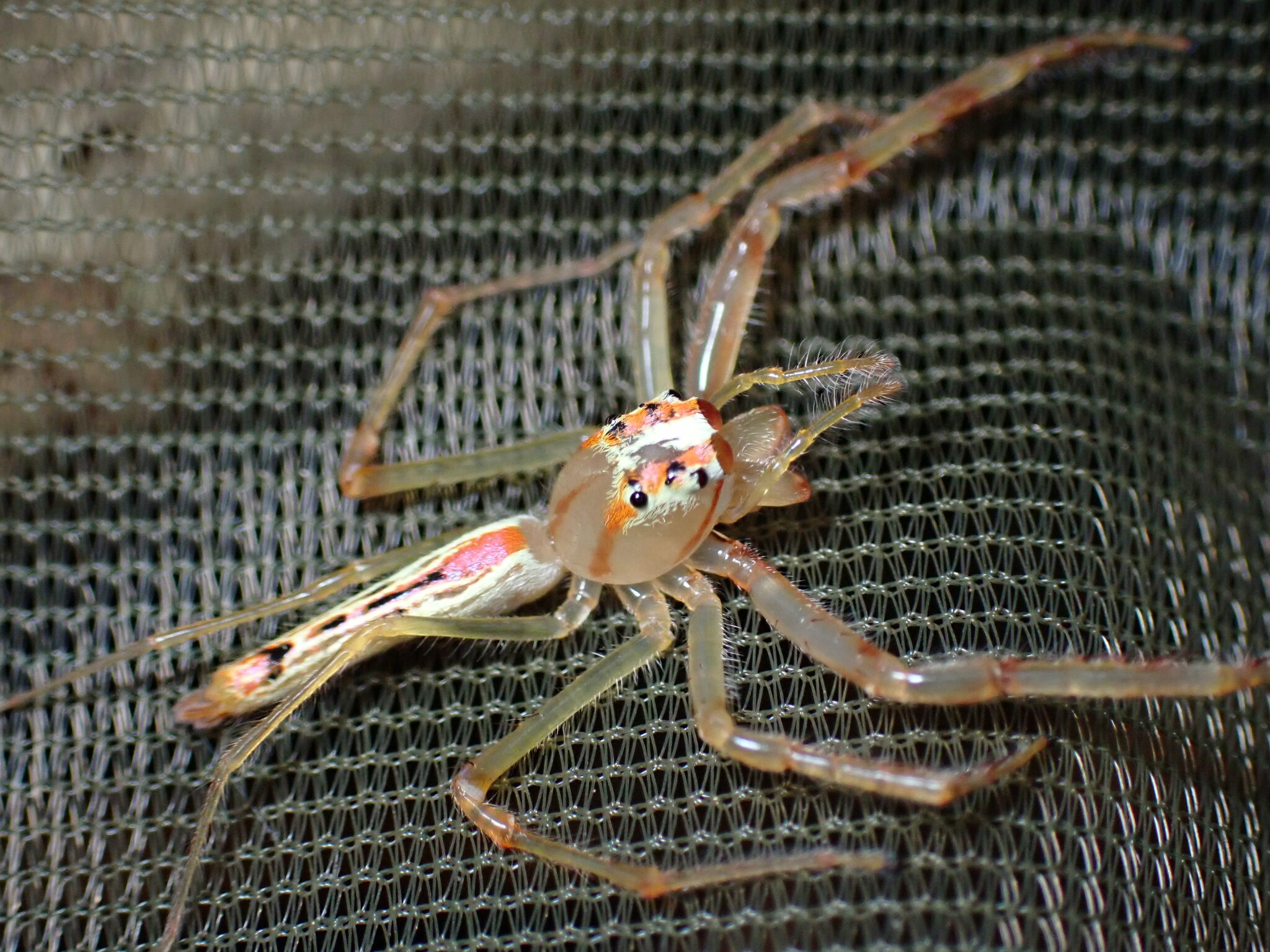
- Female from Indonesia
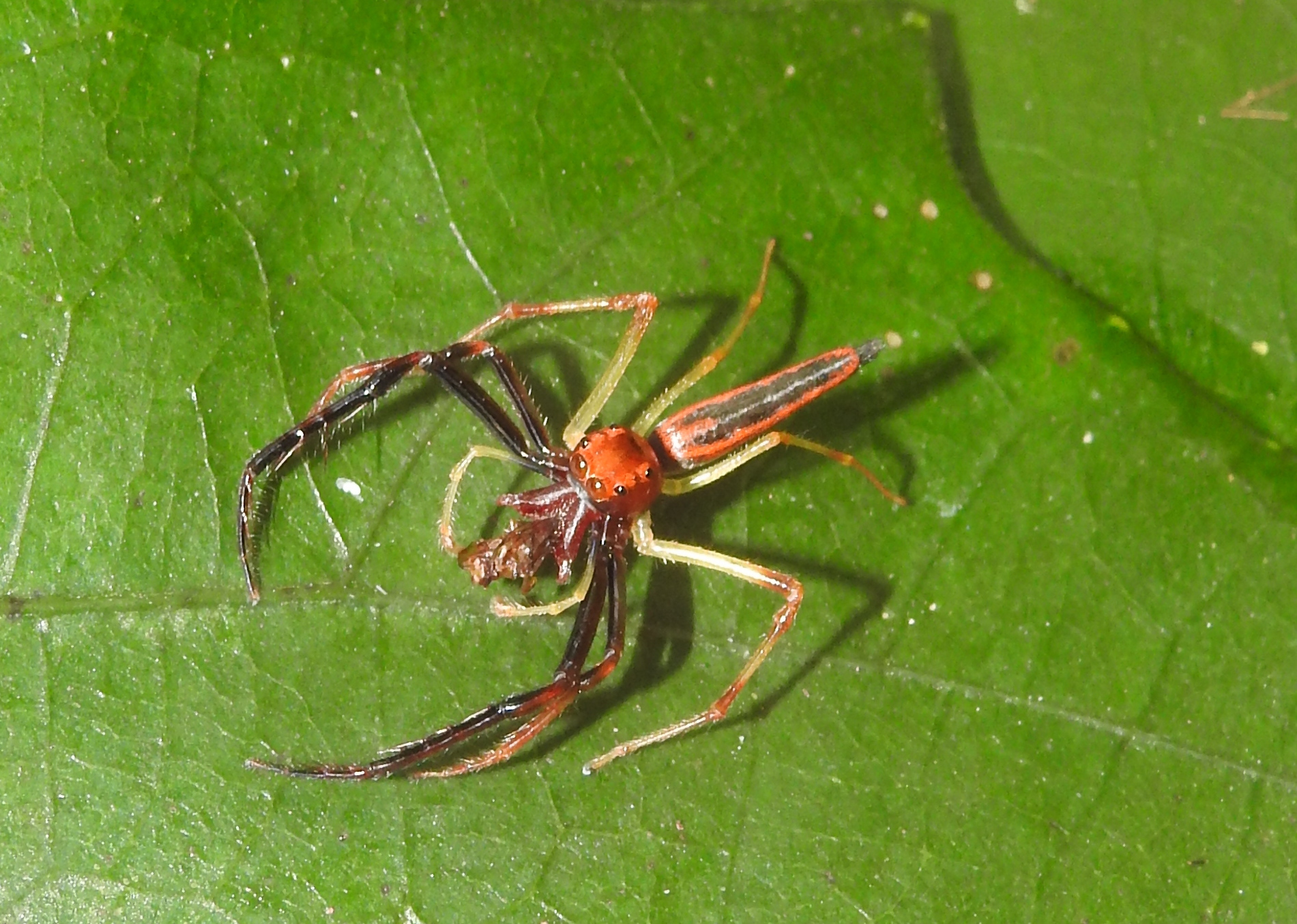
- Male from Malaysia

Scientific classification
- Kingdom: Animalia
- Phylum: Arthropoda
- Subphylum: Chelicerata
- Class: Arachnida
- Order: Araneae
- Infraorder: Araneomorphae
- Family: Salticidae
- Genus: Viciria
- Species: V. pavesii

Binomial name
- Viciria pavesii Thorell, 1877

Synonyms
- Attus praemandibularis Hasselt, 1893; Lagnus ruber Workman, 1896; Eupalia rubra Simon, 1899; Eupalia praemandibularis Simon, 1903; Eupalina praemandibularis Strand, 1932; Viciria praemandibularis Prószyński, 1984

= Viciria pavesii =

Species of spider

Viciria pavesii is a species of jumping spider in the genus Viciria. It is the type species of the genus and is found across tropical Southeast Asia.

== Taxonomy ==
The species was first described by Tamerlan Thorell in 1877 from specimens collected in Kendari, Sulawesi. The lectotype and paralectotype are housed in the Museo Civico di Storia Naturale "Giacomo Doria" in Genoa, Italy.

In 2022, David E. Hill synonymized several species with V. pavesii, including Viciria praemandibularis, which had been widely used in recent literature for Southeast Asian populations. Hill's analysis of morphological descriptions and field observations confirmed that these represent a single, widespread species, with V. pavesii having nomenclatural priority.

== Distribution ==
V. pavesii is distributed across the Sundaland region and parts of Wallacea, with confirmed records from Thailand, Malaysia, Singapore, Indonesia (including Sumatra, Java, and Sulawesi), and Brunei.

== Habitat ==
The species inhabits tropical forests and urban areas with vegetation. Females construct nests on the undersides of leaves, where they guard their egg clusters and tend to developing young.

== Description ==
Viciria pavesii is a relatively large jumping spider, with body lengths reaching approximately 10 mm in some individuals. Both sexes have distinctive long, robust spines on the undersides of the tibiae and metatarsi of the first and second legs.

The male has several distinctive characteristics: the cephalothorax is testaceous (brownish-yellow) with rust-colored longitudinal bands on the carapace. Red scales cover the ocular area and much of the dorsal opisthosoma, which is notably narrow and elongated. The chelicerae show a distinctive anterolateral extension of each paturon well beyond the articulation point of the fang. The first and second pairs of legs are often darker than the yellowish third and fourth pairs, though leg coloration can be variable. The pedipalps are characteristically long, thin, and yellowish.

The female is somewhat larger than the male and shows more uniform leg coloration. The cephalothorax displays well-defined orange and white stripes, including a distinctive whitish middorsal stripe. The opisthosoma bears several elongated black markings on its dorsal surface.

Both sexes can be identified by their large size among Southeast Asian salticids, distinctive spination pattern, and characteristic coloration patterns.
