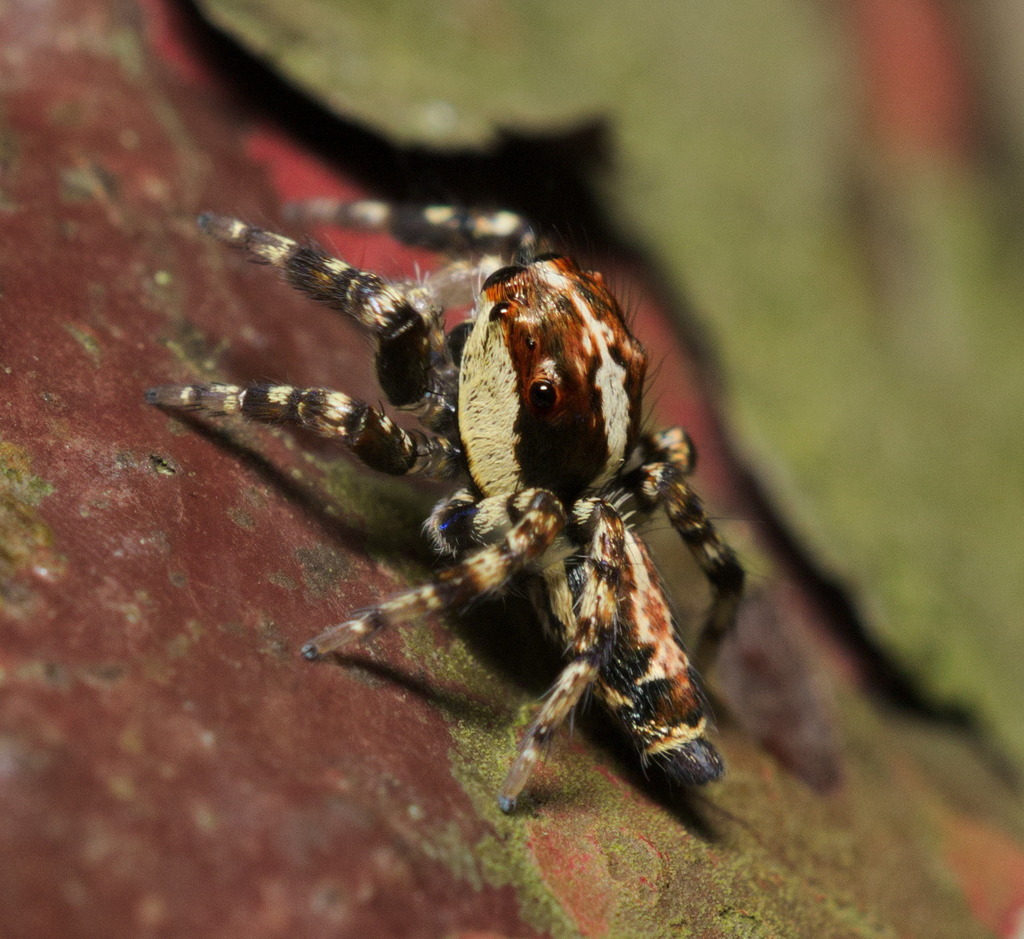
- female from Hong Kong
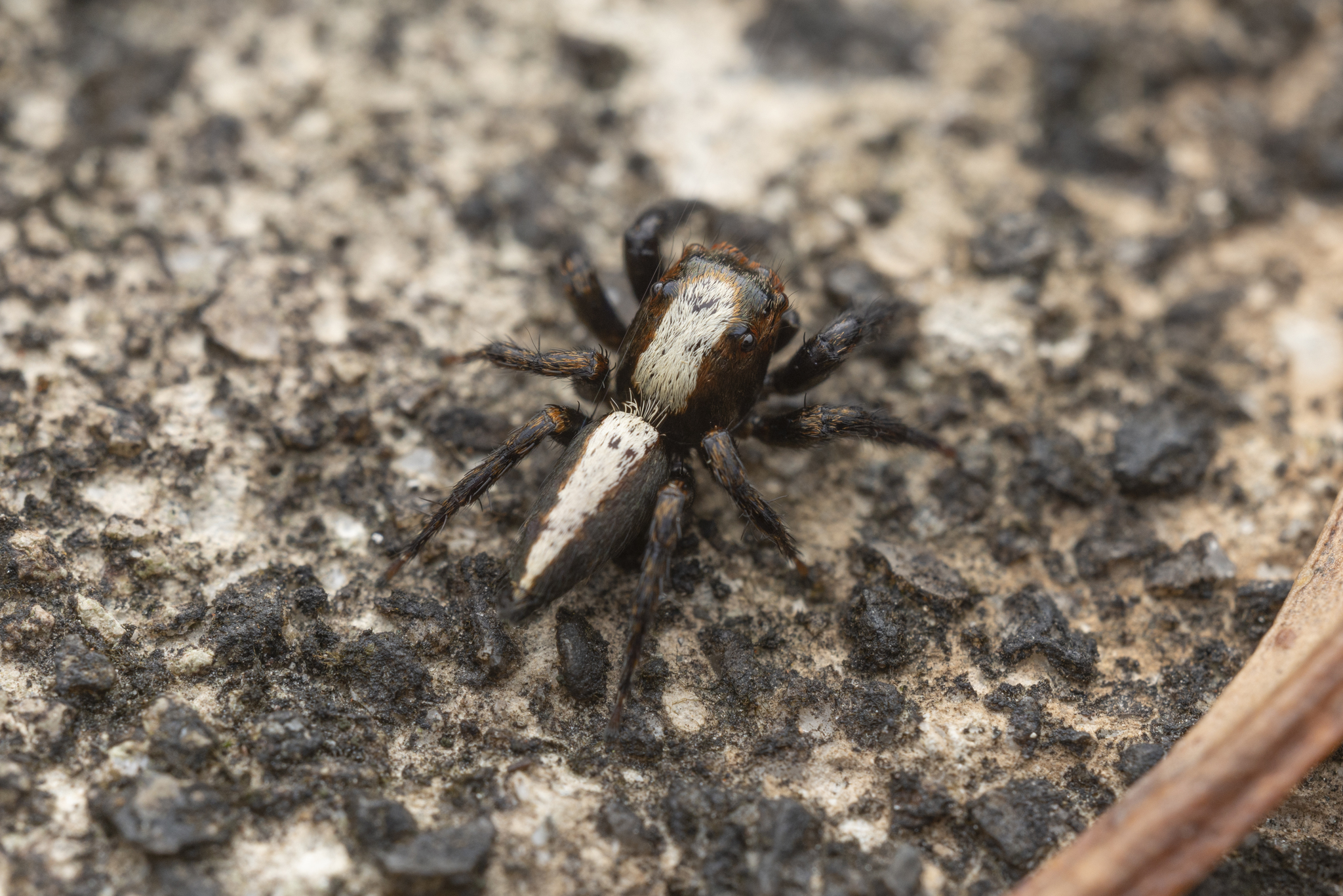
- male from Hong Kong

Scientific classification
- Kingdom: Animalia
- Phylum: Arthropoda
- Subphylum: Chelicerata
- Class: Arachnida
- Order: Araneae
- Infraorder: Araneomorphae
- Family: Salticidae
- Genus: Thyene
- Species: T. orientalis

Binomial name
- Thyene orientalis Żabka, 1985

Synonyms
- Thyene radialis Xie & Peng, 1995

= Thyene orientalis =

Species of spider

Thyene orientalis is a species of jumping spider in the family Salticidae. It is found in Japan, China, and Vietnam.

== Etymology ==
The specific epithet orientalis is Latin meaning "eastern" or "of the east", referring to the species' distribution in East Asia.

== Taxonomy ==
Thyene orientalis was originally described by Marek Żabka in 1985. In 1995, Xie Liping and Peng Xianjin described Thyene radialis, which was later determined to be a junior synonym of T. orientalis by Dmitri Logunov in 2021.

== Distribution ==
T. orientalis has been recorded from Japan, China, and Vietnam. In Japan, it was first reported from the Ryukyu Islands in 2013. The species has been collected from various provinces in China, including Guangxi Zhuang Autonomous Region.

== Description ==
Thyene orientalis is a medium-sized jumping spider. Males have a total body length of approximately 4.6 mm, with the carapace measuring about 2.2 mm long and 1.7 mm wide. Females are similar in size, with a total length around 4.7 mm.

The carapace is yellow-brown and covered with dense dark and off-white scale-like setae along the submargin, with several pale yellow scale-like setae on the clypeus and a longitudinal, indistinct, median yellow band extending across the thorax. The fovea is dark red and longitudinal. The legs are pale to yellow-brown in coloration.

The abdomen is elongated with the dorsum darker laterally and an irregular longitudinal yellow-brown band medially, covered with dense setae. The venter is gray-white to brown.
