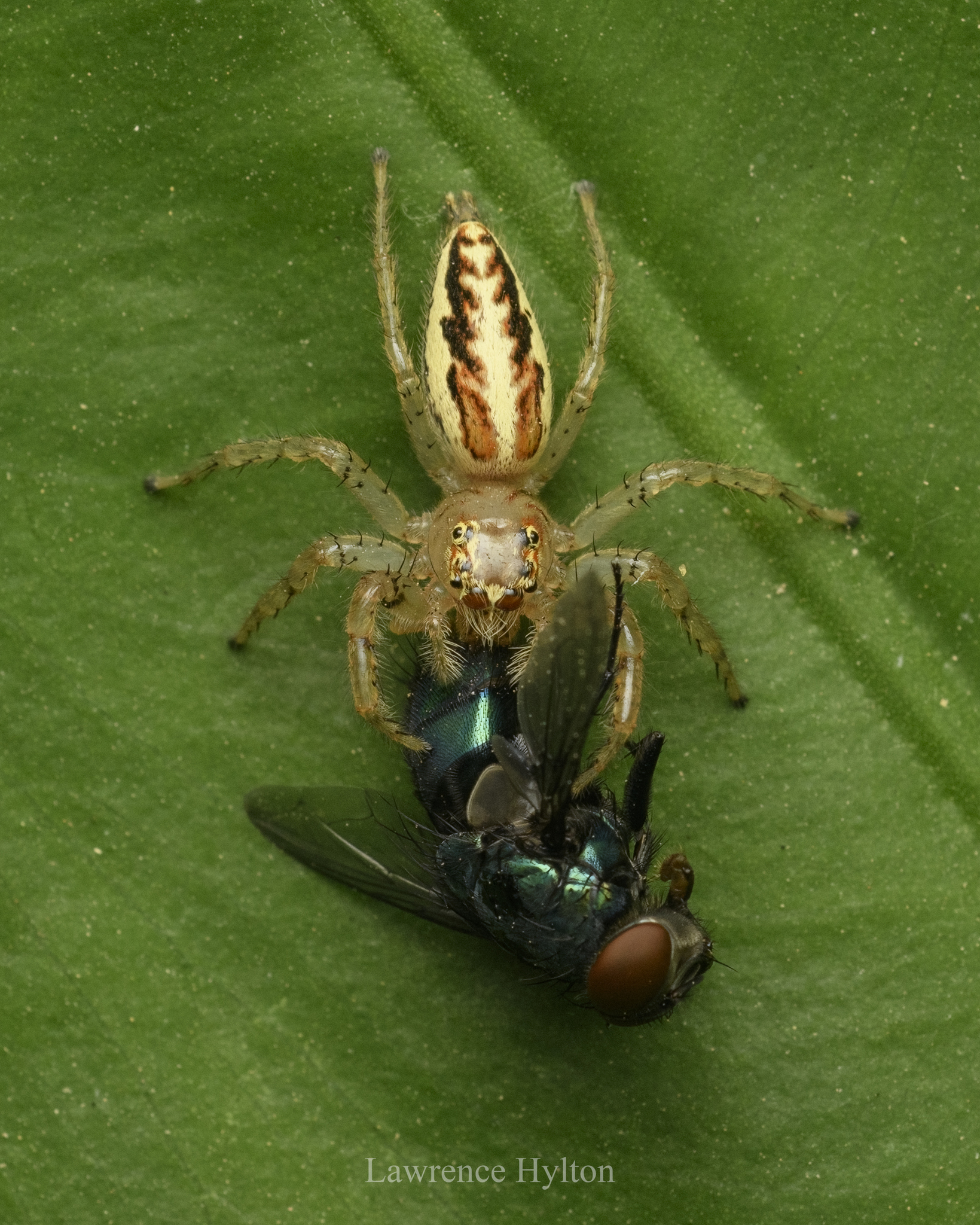
- female with prey in Hong Kong
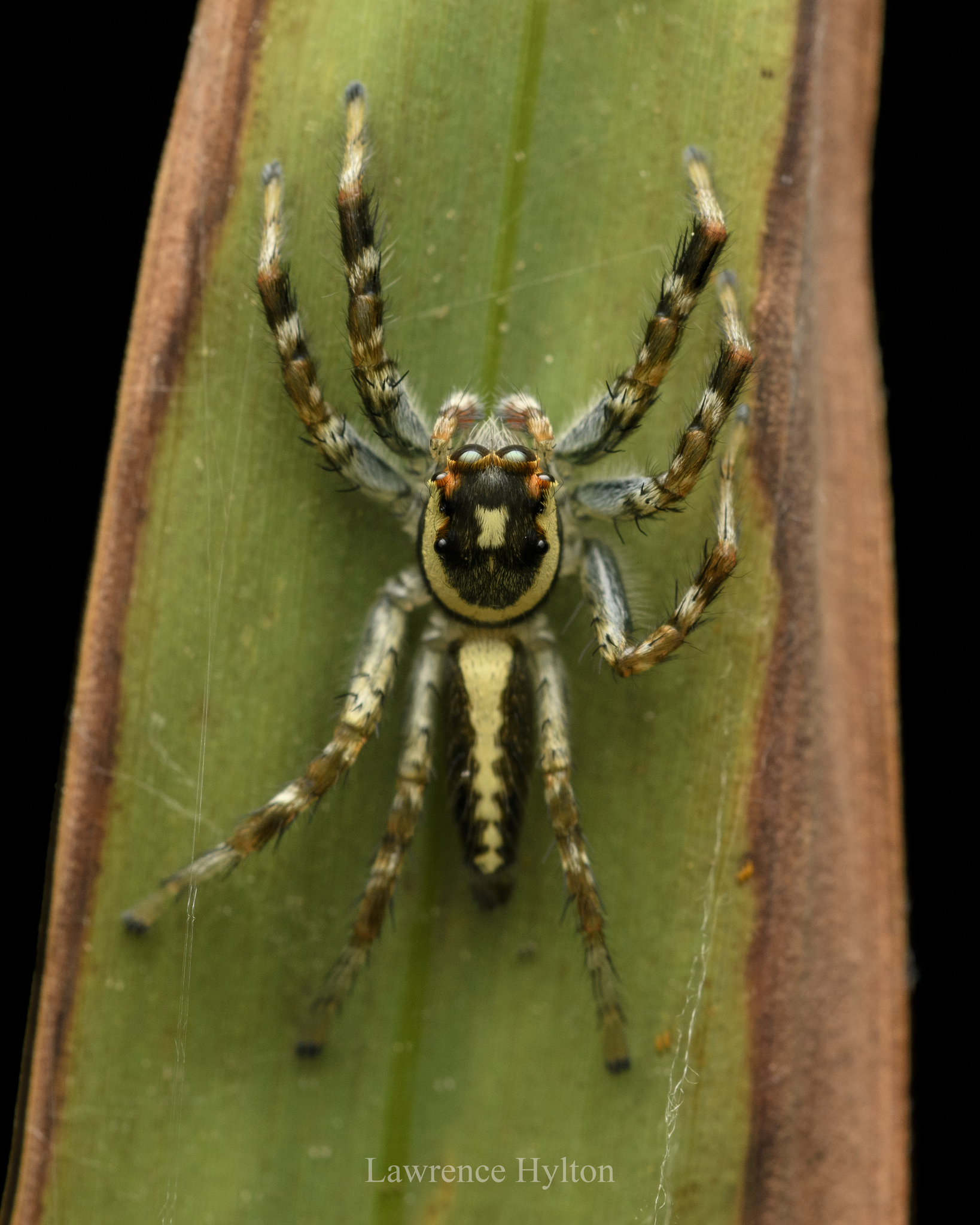
- male in Hong Kong

Scientific classification
- Kingdom: Animalia
- Phylum: Arthropoda
- Subphylum: Chelicerata
- Class: Arachnida
- Order: Araneae
- Infraorder: Araneomorphae
- Family: Salticidae
- Genus: Telamonia
- Species: T. caprina

Binomial name
- Telamonia caprina (Simon, 1903)

Synonyms
- Viciria caprina Simon, 1903

= Telamonia caprina =

Species of spider

Telamonia caprina is a species of jumping spider in the family Salticidae. It is found in China and Vietnam.

== Taxonomy ==
The species was originally described as Viciria caprina by Eugène Simon in 1903. It was later transferred to the genus Telamonia by Żabka in 1985, who redefined the genus based on morphological characteristics including the presence of short thick bristles on the lateral surface of the cymbium near the apex of the tibial apophysis.

== Distribution ==
T. caprina is known from China and Vietnam.

== Habitat ==
The species has been found in diverse habitats including tropical rainforest, dry thick forest on trunks and branches, areas with calcareous rocks and shrubs, and gardens.

== Description ==
Males have an orange-brown eye field with dark brown surroundings around the eyes, and an orange belt with white setae around the ventral margin. The cephalothorax is orange with grey-brown setae. The abdomen features a white-yellow median belt covered with white setae, with dark grey spots laterally on a grey-orange background.

The palpal organ is orange and more slender compared to related species like T. festiva, with a shorter embolus. A distinctive tuft of short thick bristles is present above the apex of the tibial apophysis.

Females are distinguished by their epigyne structure, which features baggy spermathecae with several internal septa, differing from the closely related T. festiva.
