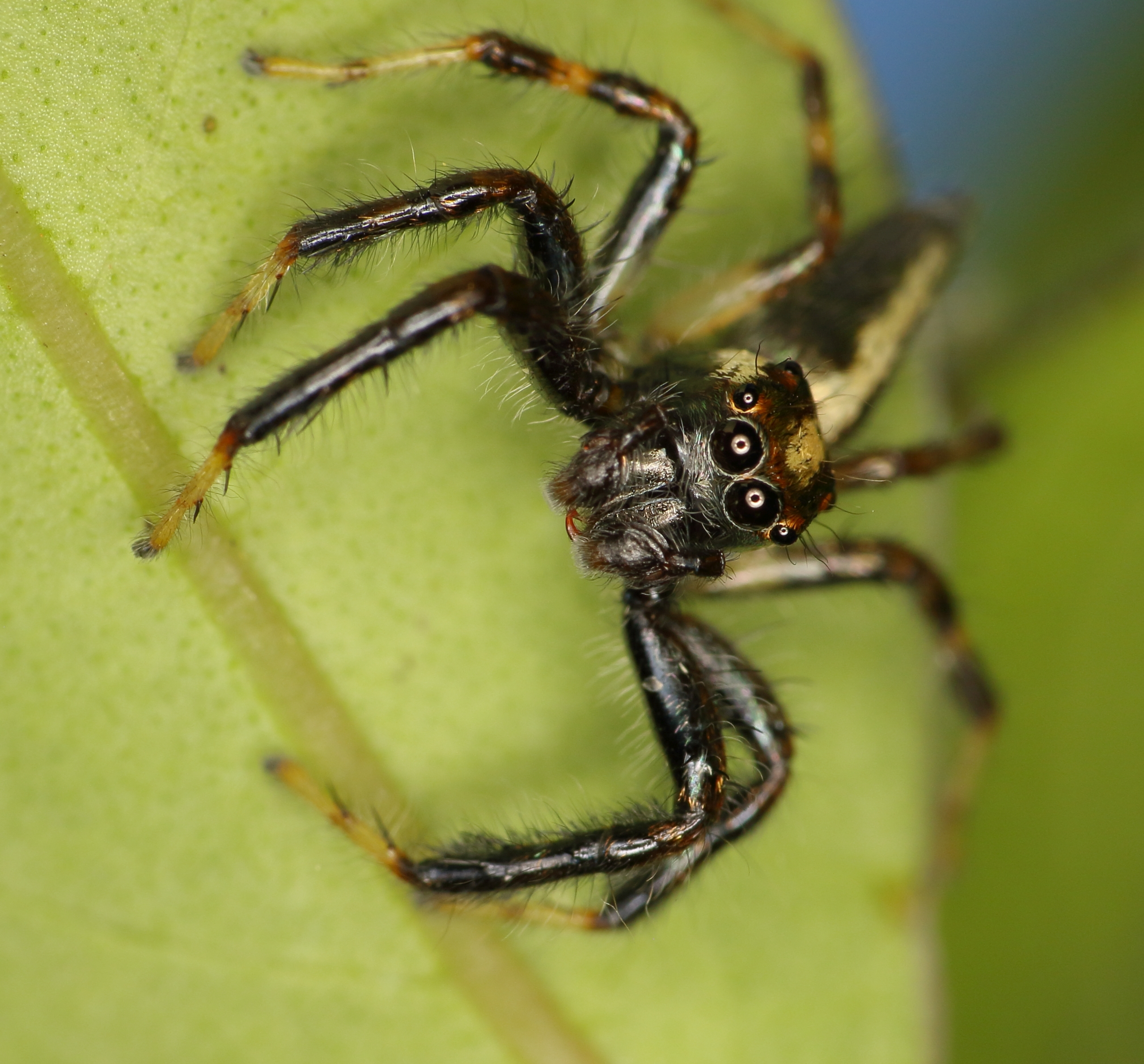
- Male Vicirionessa mustela
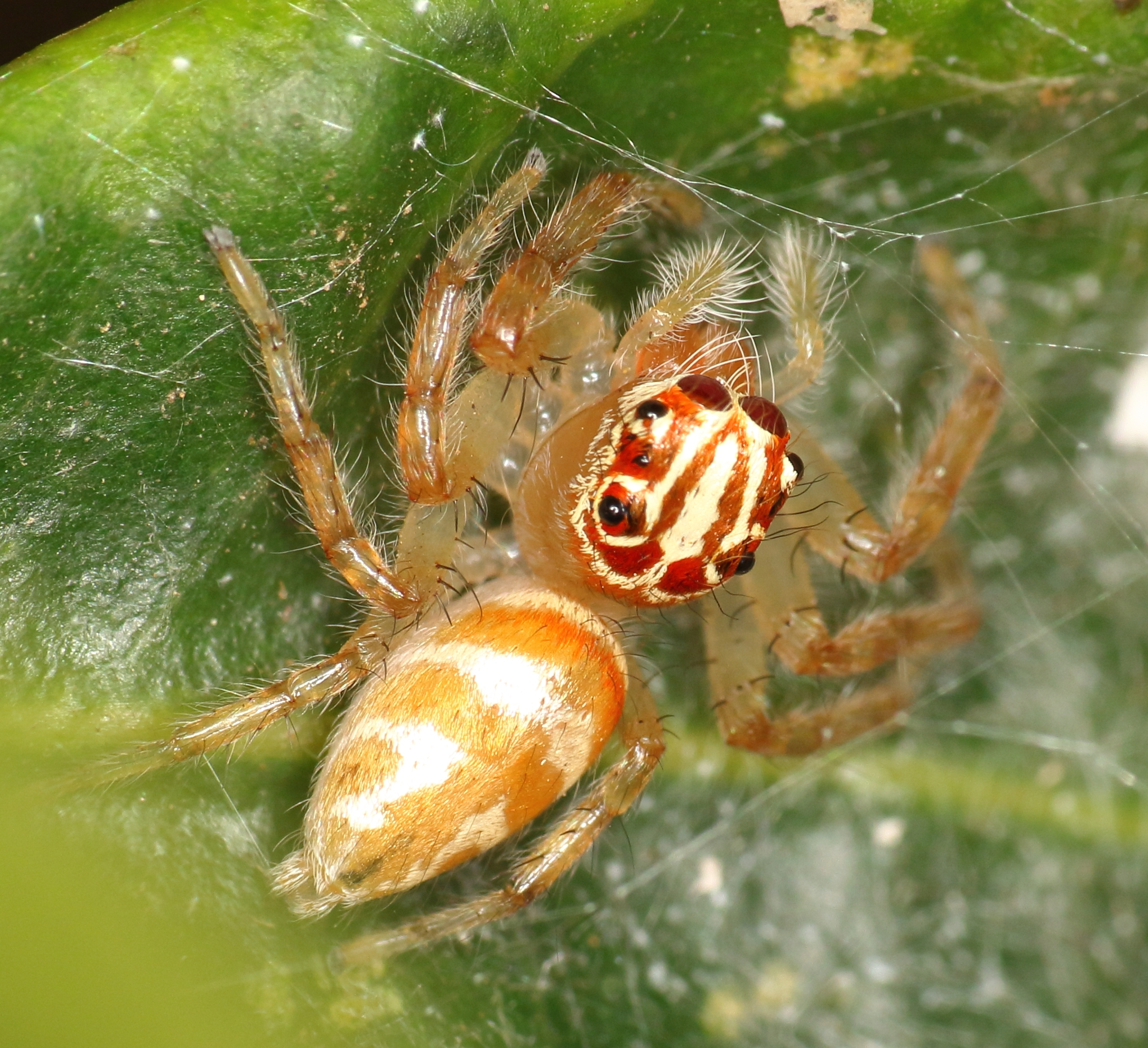
- Female Vicirionessa mustela

Scientific classification
- Kingdom: Animalia
- Phylum: Arthropoda
- Subphylum: Chelicerata
- Class: Arachnida
- Order: Araneae
- Infraorder: Araneomorphae
- Family: Salticidae
- Genus: Vicirionessa; Wesołowska & Russell-Smith, 2022

Species
- See text.

Synonyms
- Brancus

= Vicirionessa =

Genus of spiders

Vicirionessa is a genus of African spiders in the family Salticidae (jumping spiders).

== Species ==
As of October 2025, this genus includes thirteen species:

- Vicirionessa albocincta (Thorell, 1899) – Sierra Leone, Guinea, Ivory Coast, Ghana, Nigeria, Cameroon, Gabon, Uganda
- Vicirionessa besanconi (Berland & Millot, 1941) – Guinea, Nigeria
- Vicirionessa chabanaudi (Fage, 1923) – Liberia
- Vicirionessa equestris (Simon, 1903) – Guinea, Ivory Coast, Gabon
- Vicirionessa fuscimana (Simon, 1903) – Equatorial Guinea
- Vicirionessa ignota Wiśniewski & Wesołowska, 2024 – Uganda
- Vicirionessa mustela (Simon, 1902) – Angola, Zimbabwe, Mozambique, South Africa
- Vicirionessa niveimana (Simon, 1902) – Sierra Leone, Ivory Coast, Nigeria, Equatorial Guinea, Gabon, Mozambique
- Vicirionessa occidentalis (Wesołowska & Russell-Smith, 2011) – Guinea, Nigeria
- Vicirionessa peckhamorum (Lessert, 1927) – Guinea, Nigeria, DR Congo, Uganda, Mozambique (type species)
- Vicirionessa signata (Dawidowicz & Wesołowska, 2016) – Ivory Coast, Kenya
- Vicirionessa spinosa Haddad, Wiśniewski & Wesołowska, 2024 – Mozambique
- Vicirionessa tergina (Simon, 1903) – Equatorial Guinea
