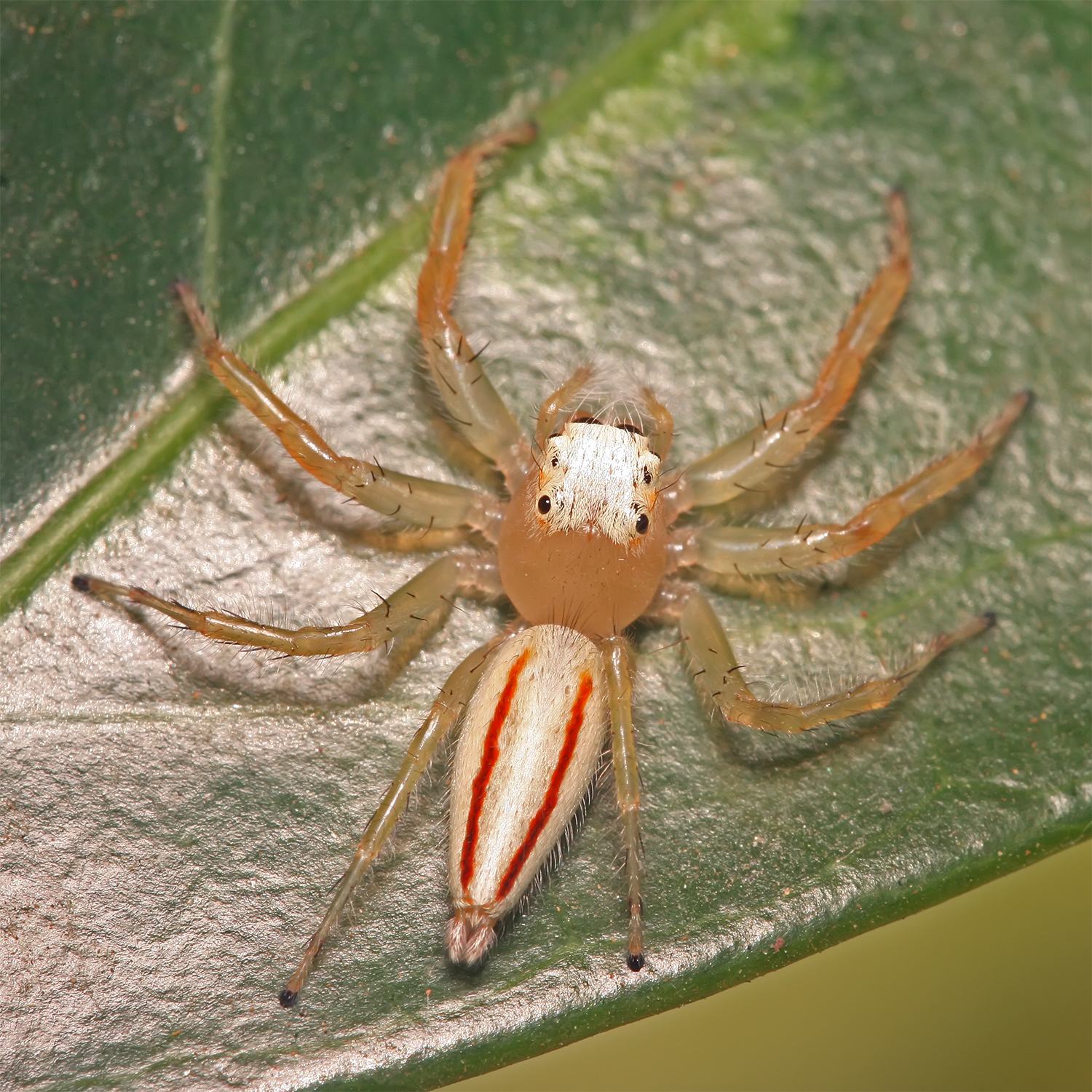
- Female

Scientific classification
- Kingdom: Animalia
- Phylum: Arthropoda
- Subphylum: Chelicerata
- Class: Arachnida
- Order: Araneae
- Infraorder: Araneomorphae
- Family: Salticidae
- Genus: Telamonia
- Species: T. dimidiata

Binomial name
- Telamonia dimidiata (Simon, 1899)

Synonyms
- Viciria dimidiata Simon, 1899; Phidippus pateli Tikader, 1974

= Telamonia dimidiata =

Two-striped jumper

Species of spider

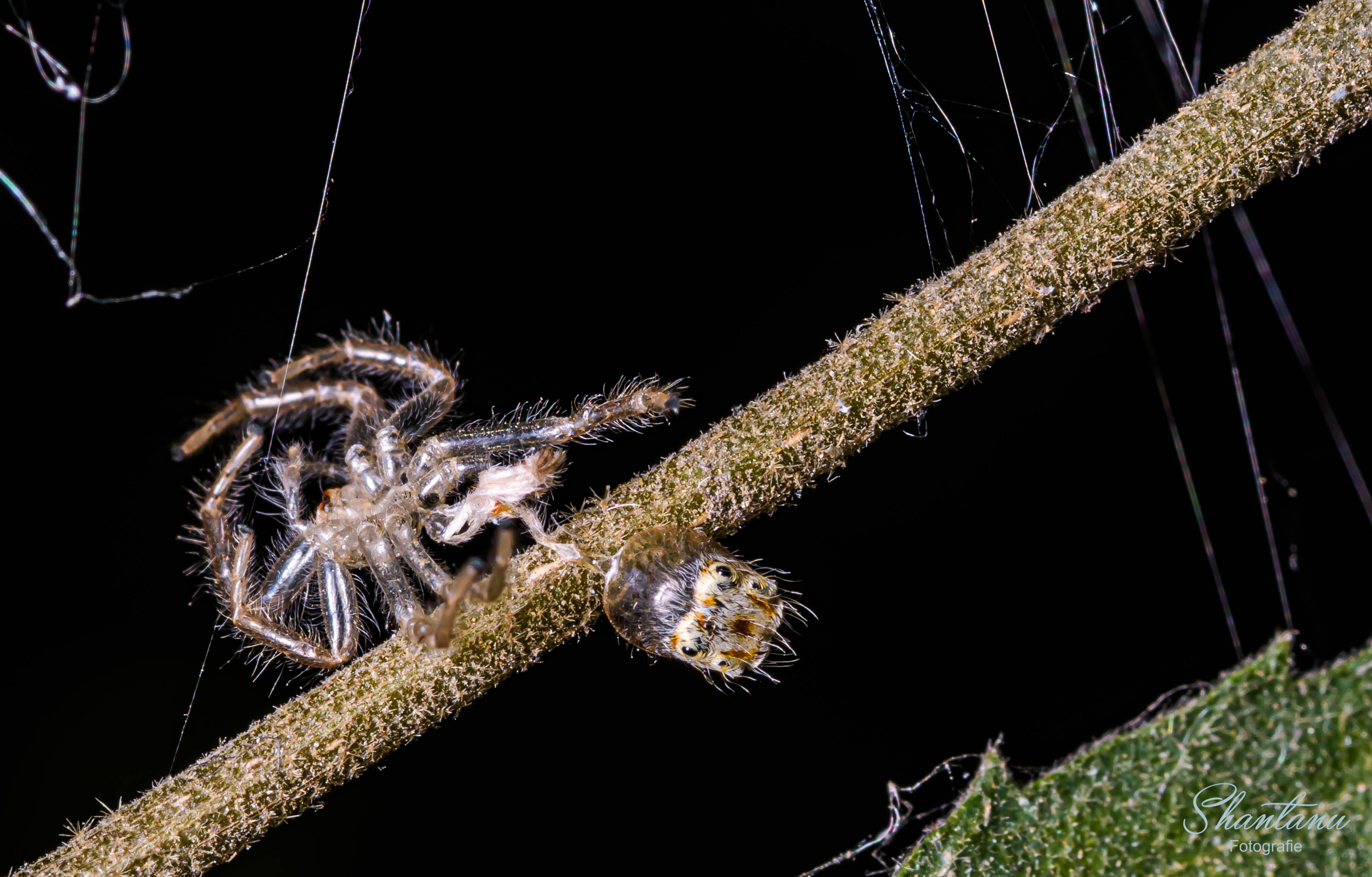
The moult of two-striped jumper.

The two-striped jumper, or Telamonia dimidiata, is a jumping spider found in various Asian tropical rain forests, in foliage in wooded environments.

== Description ==
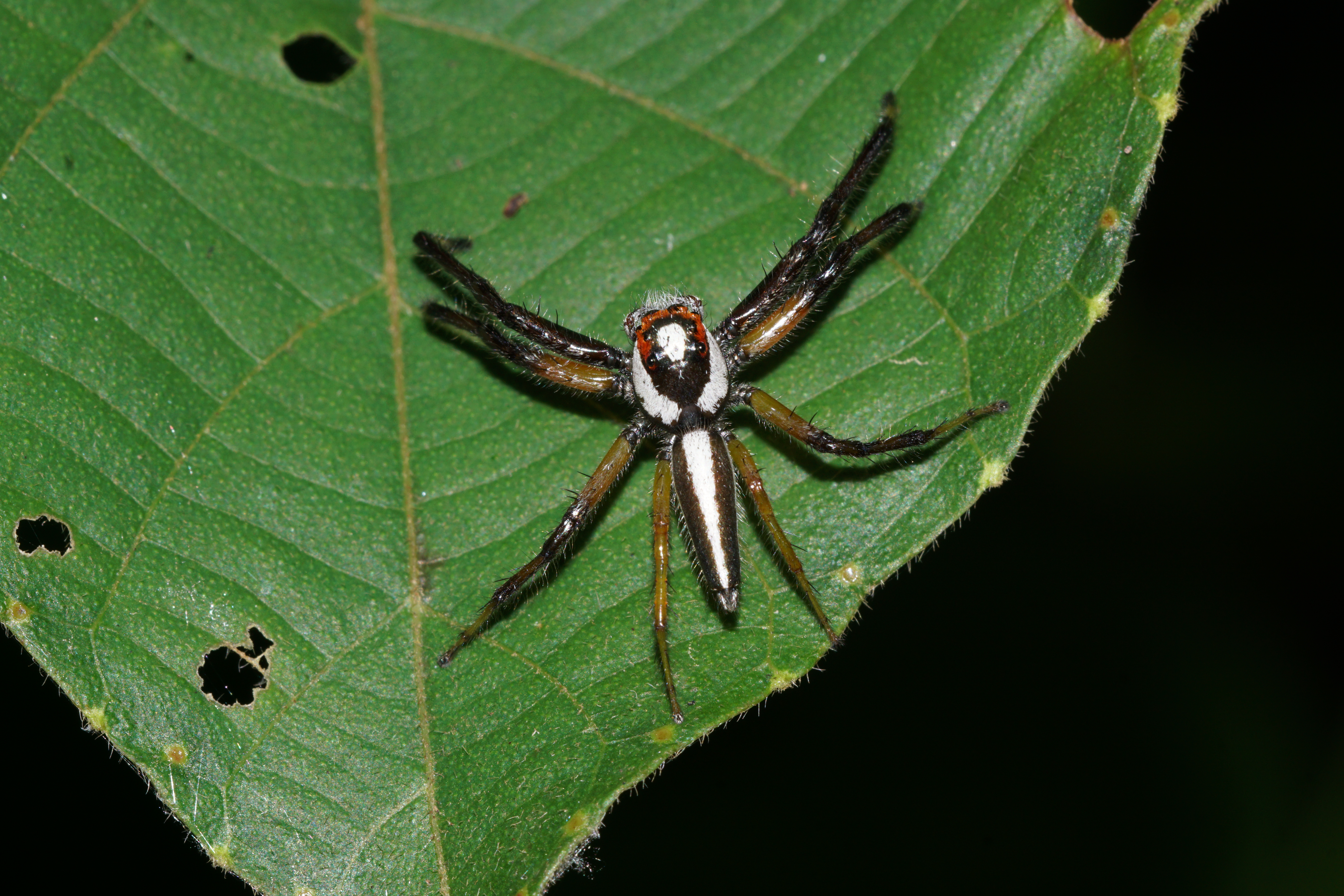
Male in Kerala, India

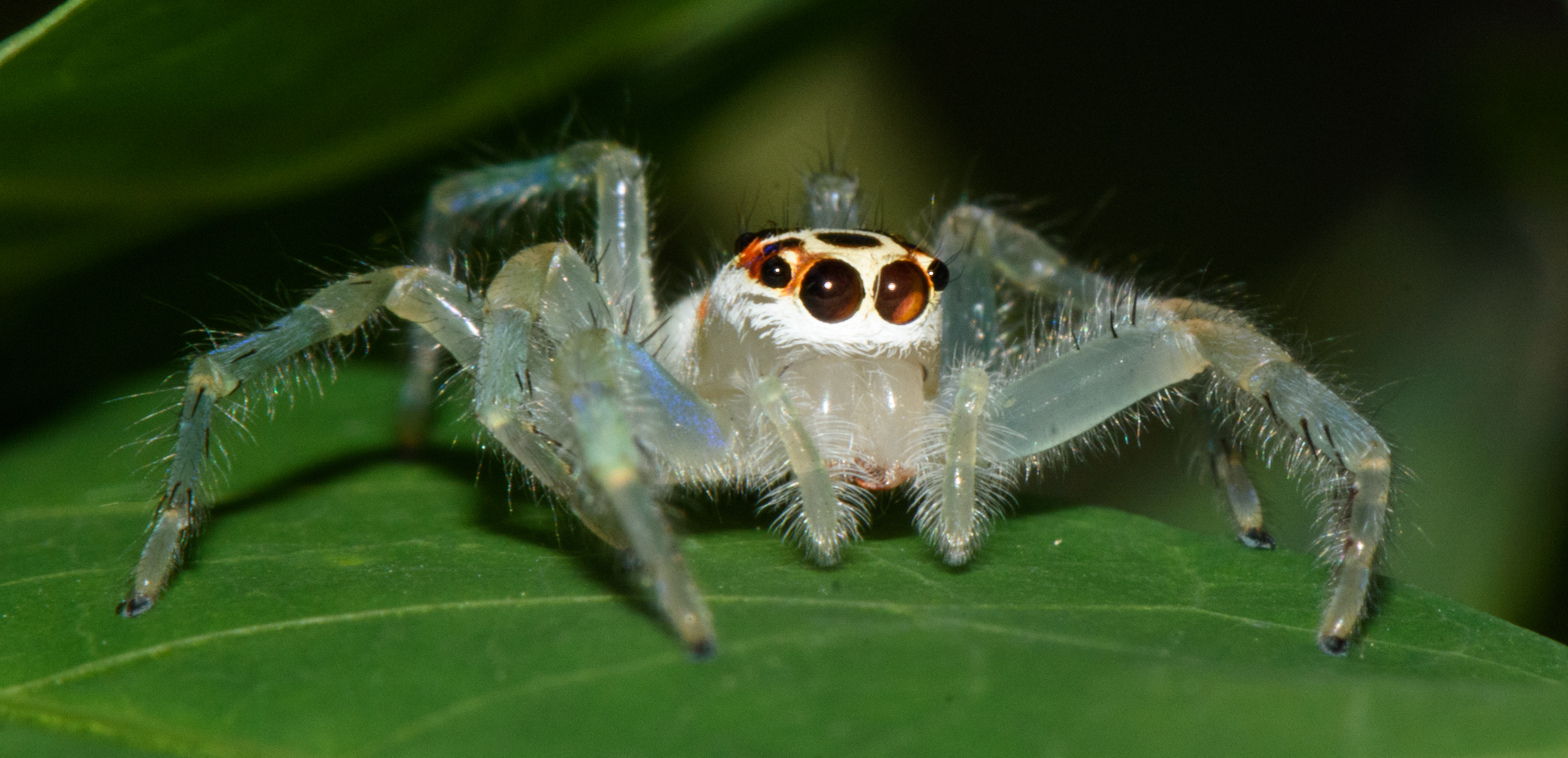
Female in Kerala, India

Females can reach a body length of 9–11 mm (0.35–0.43 in), males can reach a length of 8–9 mm (0.31–0.35 in). The female is light yellowish, with a very white cephalus and red rings surrounding the narrow black rings around the eyes. Two longitudinal bright red stripes are present on the opisthosoma. The male is very dark, with white markings, and red hairs around the eyes. They appear in Singapore, Indonesia, Pakistan, Iran, India, and Bhutan. T. dimidiata produces no toxin significant to humans.

== Email hoax ==
Since 1999, the spider has been the subject of an email hoax claiming that it was a fatal spider found lurking under toilet seats in North Florida. This hoax was a rehashing of an older email circulated in 1999 with similar claims, except under the name "South American Blush Spider (arachnius gluteus [sic])" - literally "butt spider". Similar email hoaxes (with details of the original changed) occurred in other parts of the world, alleging the same falsity in the recipients' countries. Lately it has also appeared on Facebook, also including a picture of the arachnid. Posts commonly report of it being found world-round, suggesting everyone must take precautions. No such events appear to have occurred, and the story is considered an urban legend. The false rumor has since spread to websites such as Twitter, Facebook and Tumblr in 2012. The same hoax was circulating on WhatsApp in 2018. The hoax has also been seen on Facebook in 2019.
