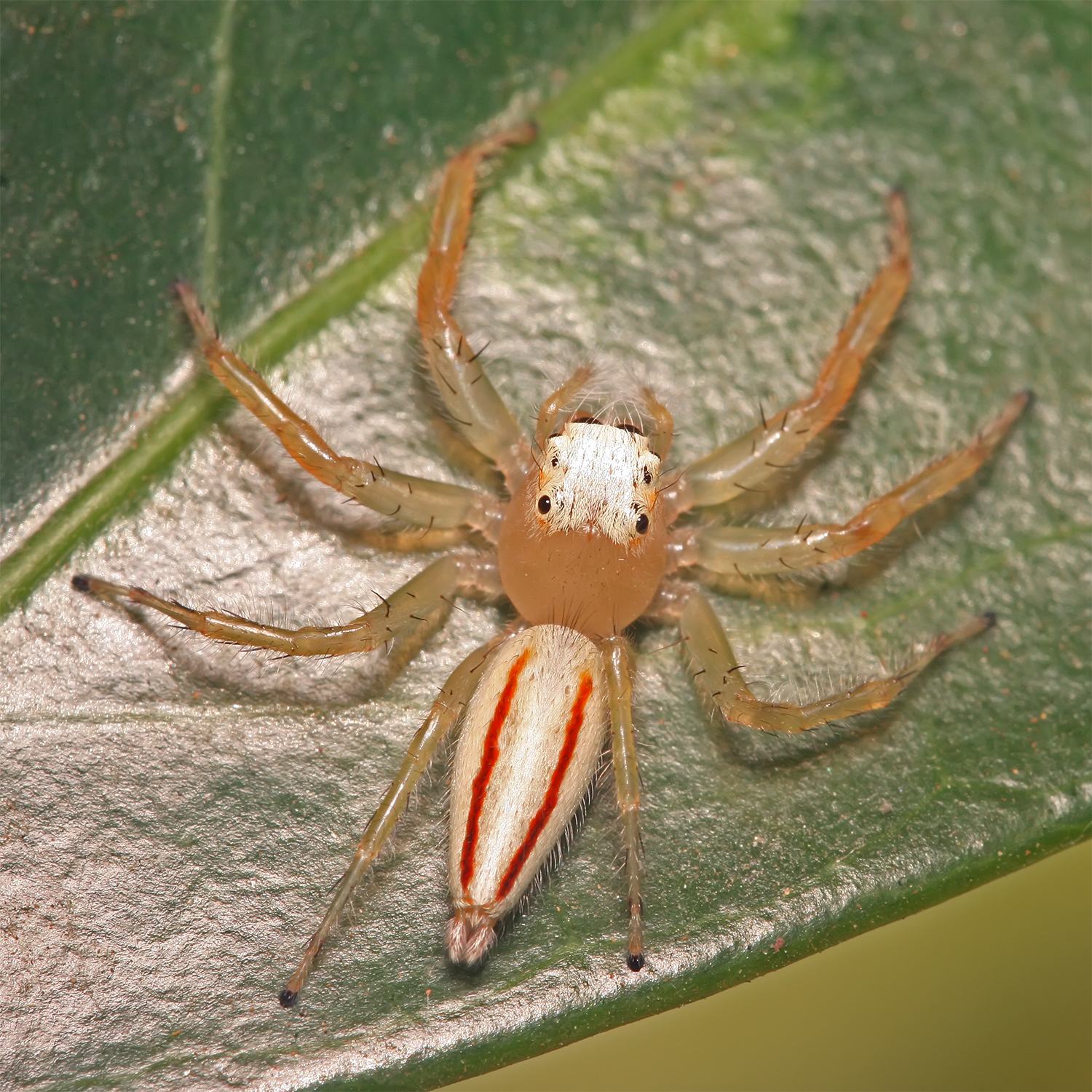
- Female Telamonia dimidiata
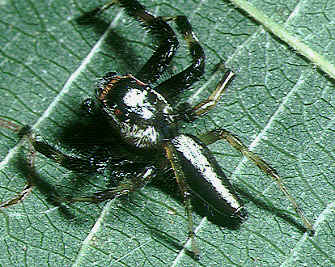
- male T. vlijmi

Scientific classification
- Kingdom: Animalia
- Phylum: Arthropoda
- Subphylum: Chelicerata
- Class: Arachnida
- Order: Araneae
- Infraorder: Araneomorphae
- Family: Salticidae
- Subfamily: Salticinae
- Genus: Telamonia; Thorell, 1887

Type species
- T. festiva Thorell, 1887

Species
- 39, see text

= Telamonia =

Genus of spiders

Telamonia is a genus of jumping spiders that was first described by Tamerlan Thorell in 1887. They are colorful spiders, with patterns that vary considerably between sexes and species. Two longitudinal stripes along the abdomen are common, and the carapace is often colored. They have a slender opisthosoma and long legs.

== Species ==
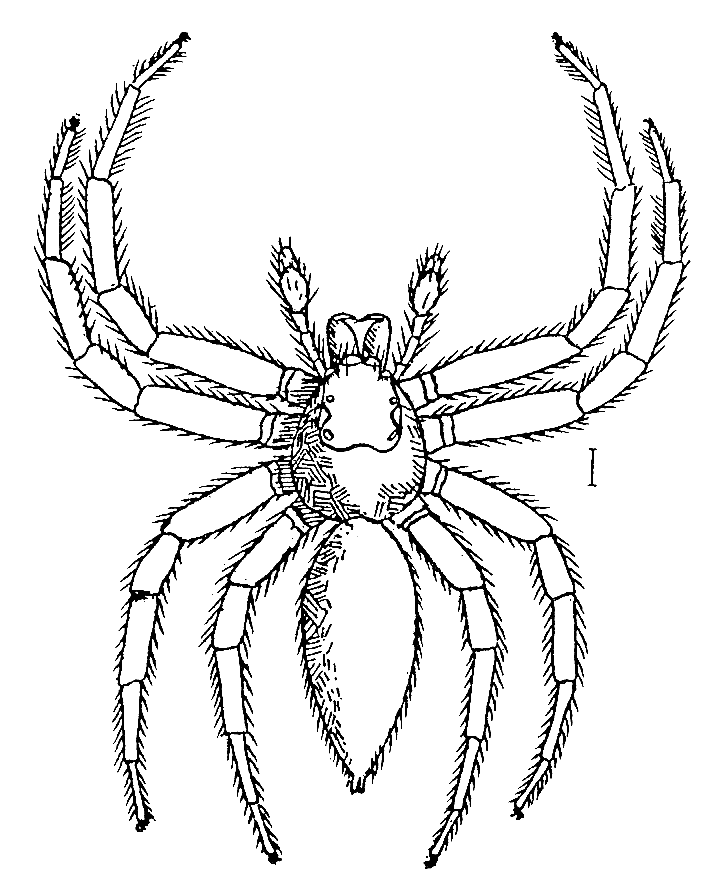
male T. hasselti

As of August 2019 it contains thirty-nine species and two subspecies, found in the rain forests of Africa and Asia, including Papua New Guinea:

- Telamonia agapeta (Thorell, 1881) – New Guinea
- Telamonia annulipes Peckham & Peckham, 1907 – Borneo
- Telamonia bombycina (Simon, 1902) – Borneo
- Telamonia borreyi Berland & Millot, 1941 – Mali
  - Telamonia b. minor Berland & Millot, 1941 – Mali
- Telamonia caprina (Simon, 1903) – China, Vietnam
- Telamonia coeruleostriata (Doleschall, 1859) – Indonesia (Ambon)
- Telamonia comosissima (Simon, 1886) – Congo
- Telamonia cristata Peckham & Peckham, 1907 – Philippines
- Telamonia dimidiata (Simon, 1899) – India, Bhutan, Malaysia, Indonesia (Sumatra)
- Telamonia dissimilis Próchniewicz, 1990 – Bhutan
- Telamonia elegans (Thorell, 1887) – Myanmar, Vietnam, Indonesia
- Telamonia festiva Thorell, 1887 (type) – Myanmar to Indonesia (Java)
  - Telamonia f. nigrina (Simon, 1903) – Vietnam
- Telamonia formosa (Simon, 1902) – Indonesia (Java)
- Telamonia hasselti (Thorell, 1878) – Myanmar to Indonesia (Sulawesi)
- Telamonia jolensis (Simon, 1902) – Philippines
- Telamonia laecta Próchniewicz, 1990 – Bhutan
- Telamonia latruncula (Thorell, 1877) – Indonesia (Sulawesi)
- Telamonia leopoldi Roewer, 1938 – New Guinea
- Telamonia livida (Karsch, 1880) – Philippines
- Telamonia luteocincta (Thorell, 1891) – Malaysia
- Telamonia luxiensis Peng, Yin, Yan & Kim, 1998 – China
- Telamonia mandibulata Hogg, 1915 – New Guinea
- Telamonia masinloc Barrion & Litsinger, 1995 – Philippines
- Telamonia mundula (Thorell, 1877) – Indonesia (Sulawesi)
- Telamonia mustelina Simon, 1901 – China (Hong Kong)
- Telamonia parangfestiva Barrion & Litsinger, 1995 – Philippines
- Telamonia peckhami Thorell, 1891 – India (Nicobar Is.)
- Telamonia prima Próchniewicz, 1990 – Bhutan
- Telamonia resplendens Peckham & Peckham, 1907 – Borneo
- Telamonia scalaris (Thorell, 1881) – Indonesia (Moluccas)
- Telamonia setosa (Karsch, 1880) – Philippines
- Telamonia shepardi Barrion, Barrion-Dupo & Heong, 2013 – China
- Telamonia sponsa (Simon, 1902) – Sri Lanka
- Telamonia trabifera (Thorell, 1881) – New Guinea
- Telamonia trinotata Simon, 1903 – Equatorial Guinea
- Telamonia trochilus (Doleschall, 1859) – Indonesia (Java)
- Telamonia vidua Hogg, 1915 – New Guinea
- Telamonia virgata Simon, 1903 – Gabon
- Telamonia vlijmi Prószyński, 1984 – China, Korea, Japan
