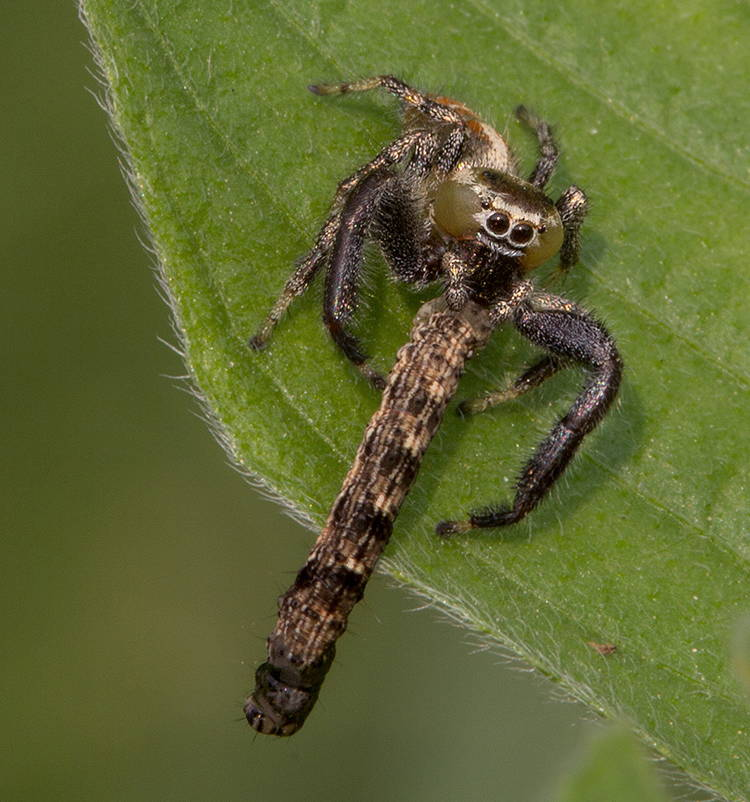
- Thyene imperialis with prey
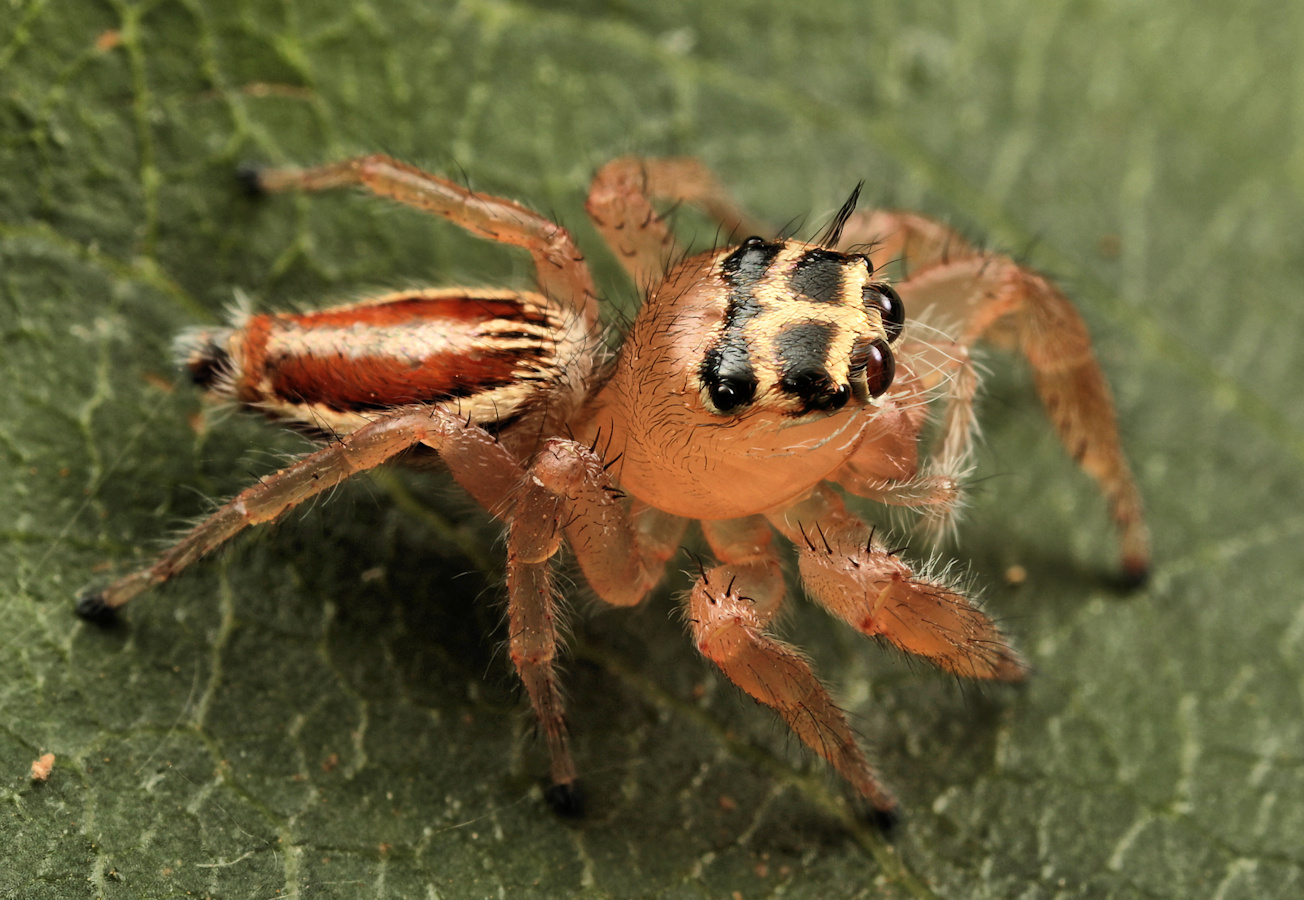
- T. inflata from South Africa

Scientific classification
- Kingdom: Animalia
- Phylum: Arthropoda
- Subphylum: Chelicerata
- Class: Arachnida
- Order: Araneae
- Infraorder: Araneomorphae
- Family: Salticidae
- Subfamily: Salticinae
- Genus: Thyene; Simon, 1885

Type species
- T. imperialis (Rossi, 1846)

Species
- 58, see text

Synonyms
- Brancus Simon, 1902; Gangus Simon, 1902; Mithion Simon, 1884; Paramodunda Lessert, 1925; Thya Simon, 1876

= Thyene =

Genus of spiders

Thyene is a genus of jumping spiders that was first described by Eugène Louis Simon in 1885. It is a junior synonym of Mithion, and senior synonym of Brancus, Paramodunda and Gangus.

== Distribution ==
Spiders in this genus are found in Africa, Europe, Asia, Brazil, and Queensland.

== Species ==
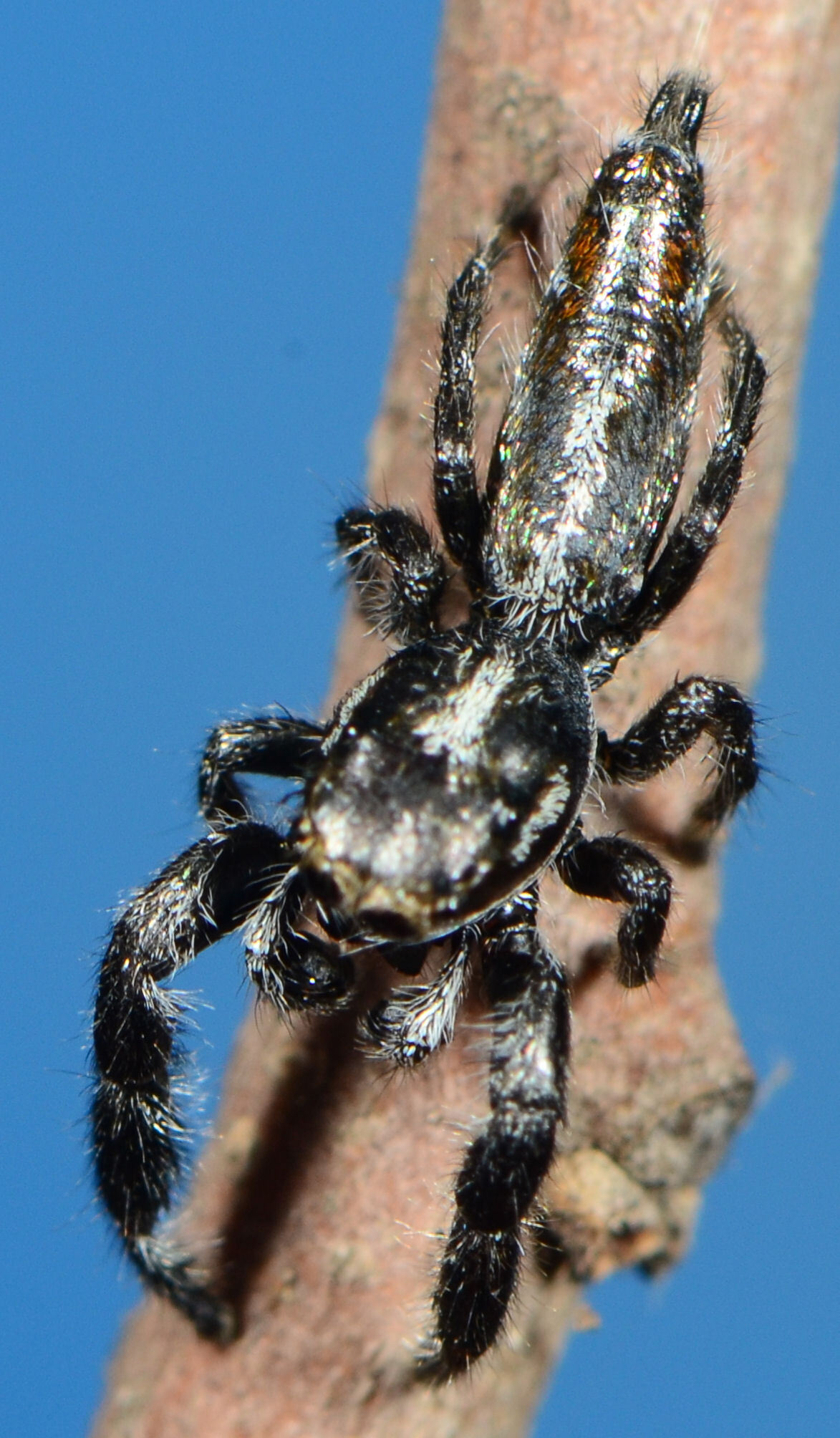
male T. aperta

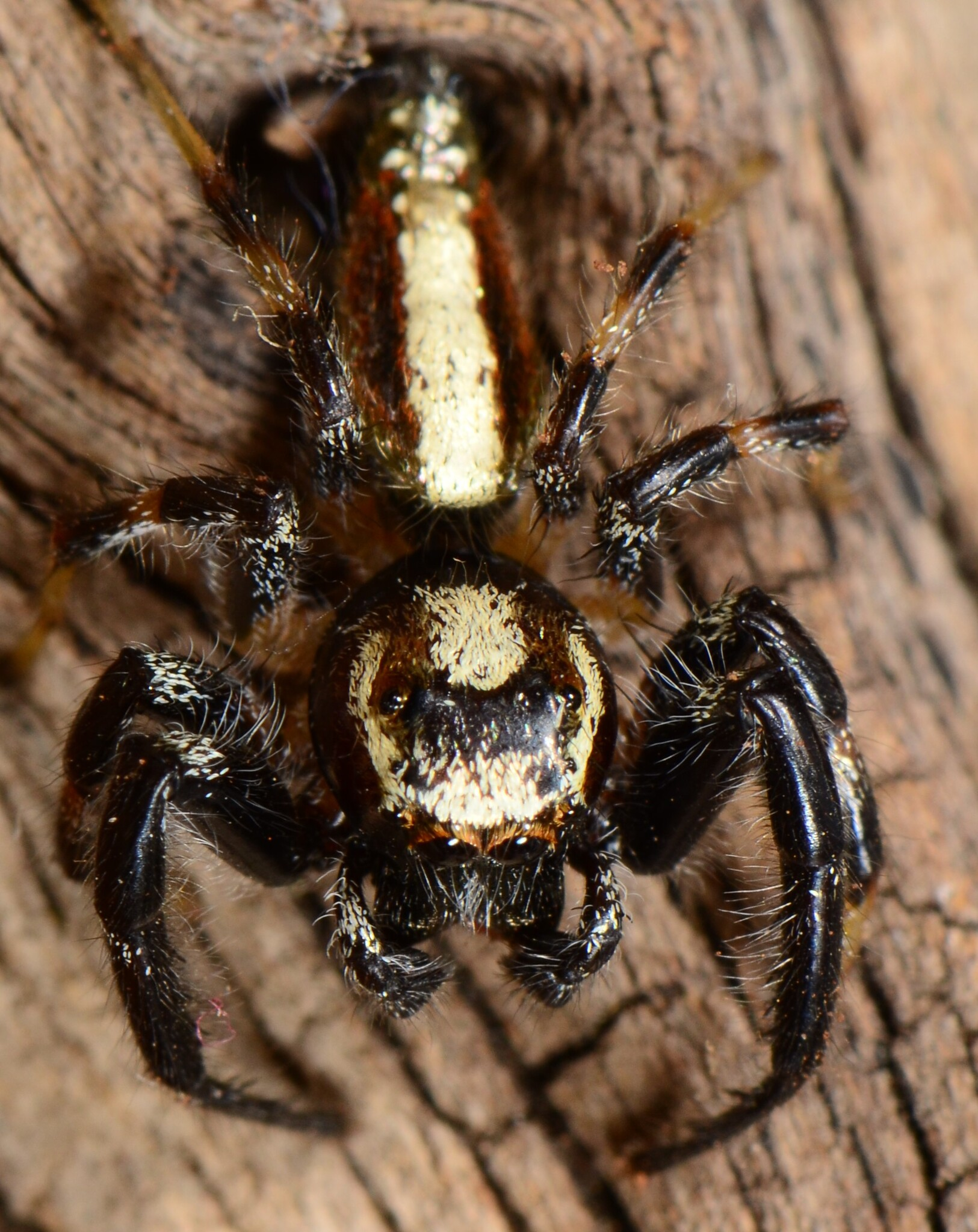
male T. australis

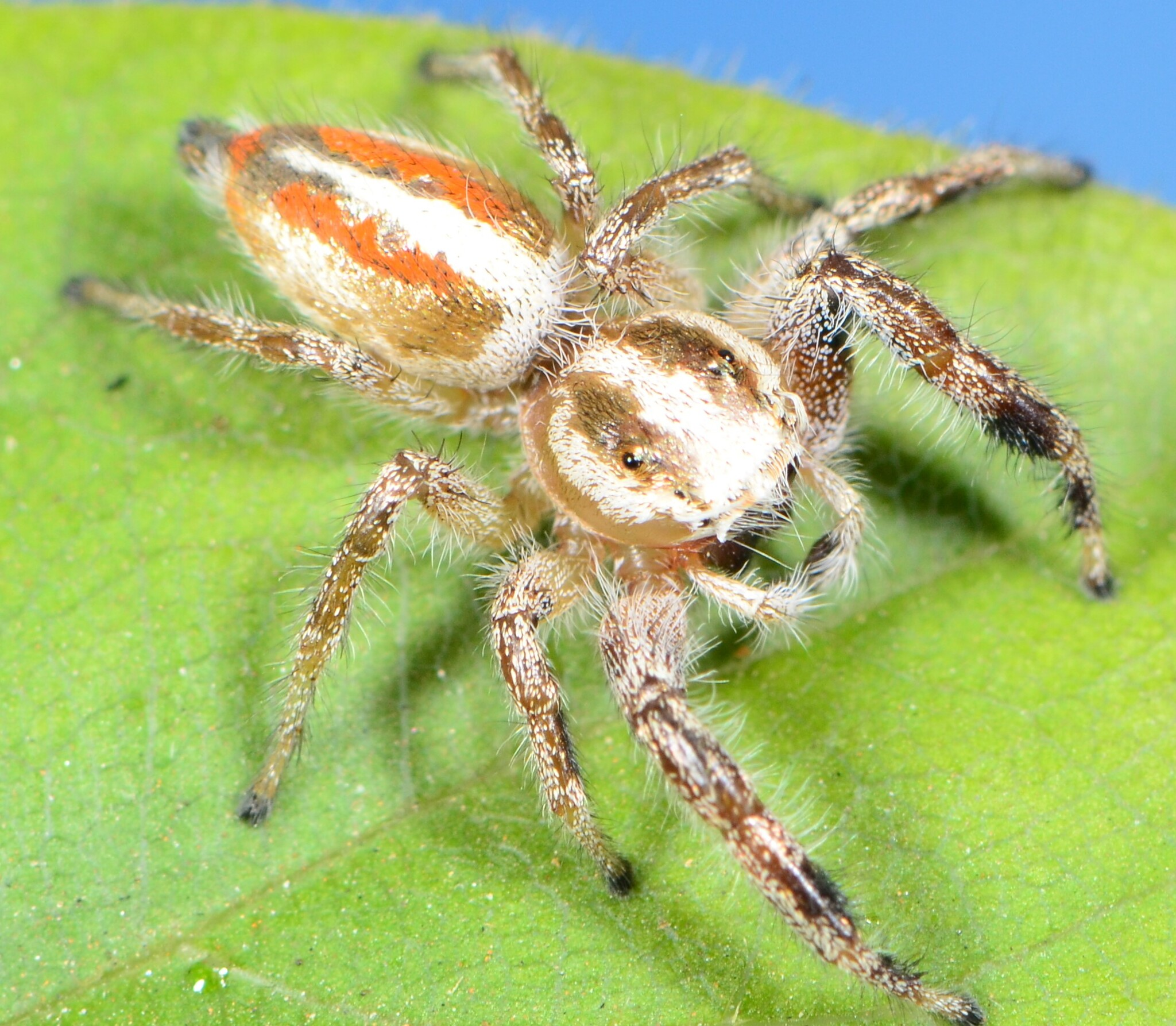
maleT. bilineata

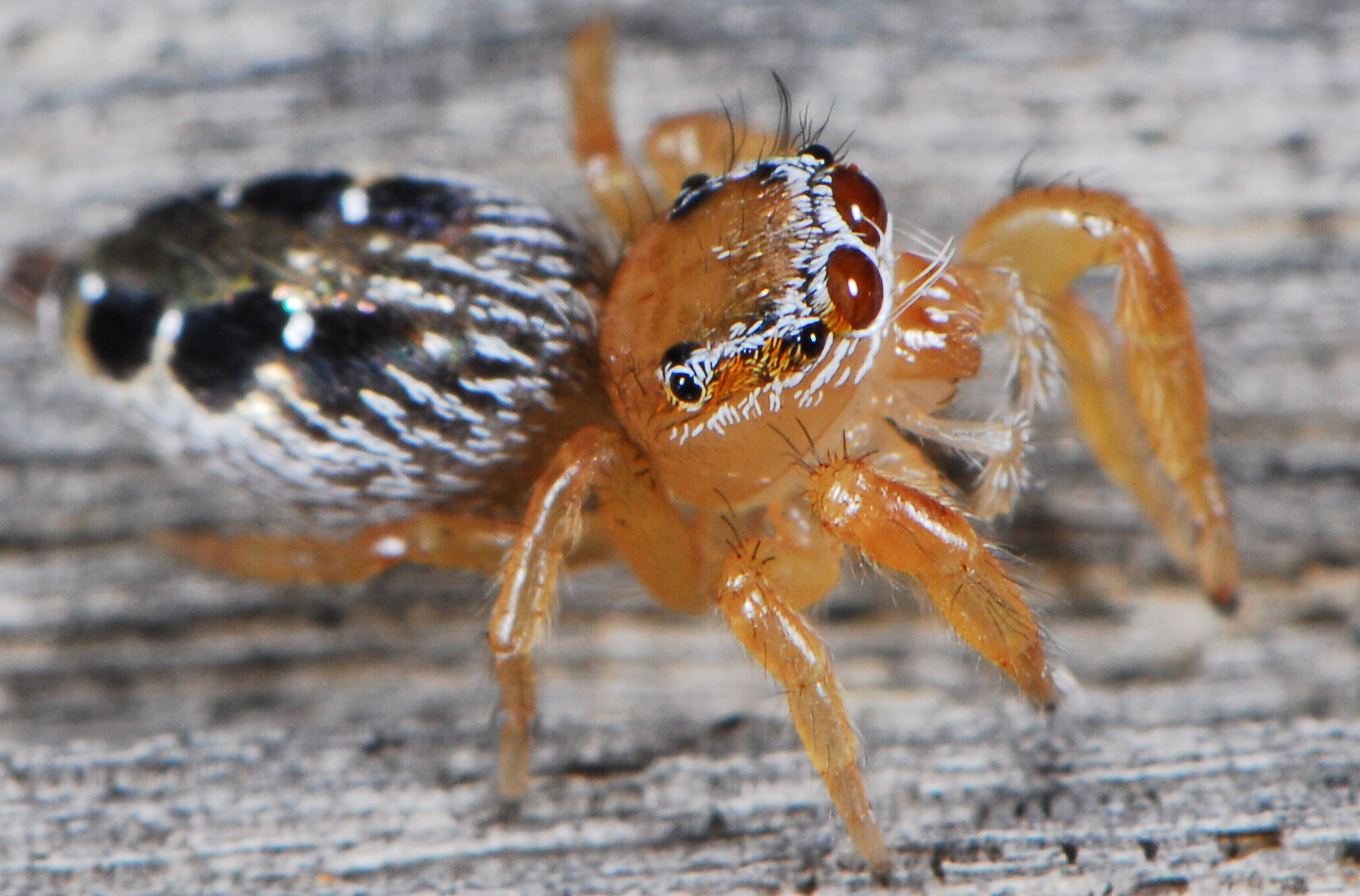
juvenile female T. coccineovittata

As of October 2025, this genus includes 58 species and one subspecies:

- Thyene aperta (G. W. Peckham & E. G. Peckham, 1903) – Guinea, Ivory Coast, Ghana, Uganda, Tanzania, Zimbabwe, Mozambique
- Thyene australis G. W. Peckham & E. G. Peckham, 1903 – DR Congo, Uganda, Zimbabwe, South Africa
- Thyene benjamini Prószyński & Deeleman-Reinhold, 2010 – Indonesia (Sumbawa)
- Thyene bilaguncula (Xie & Peng, 1995) – China
- Thyene bilineata Lawrence, 1927 – Namibia, South Africa
- Thyene bivittata Xie & Peng, 1995 – Pakistan, India, Nepal, China
- Thyene blaisei (Simon, 1902) – Gabon, Uganda
- Thyene bucculenta (Gerstaecker, 1873) – Guinea, Ethiopia, Tanzania, Mozambique
- Thyene calebi (Kanesharatnam & Benjamin, 2018) – India, Sri Lanka
- Thyene chopardi Berland & Millot, 1941 – Guinea, Niger
- Thyene coccineovittata (Simon, 1886) – Mali, Senegal, Guinea, Ivory Coast, Ghana, Uganda, Kenya, Mozambique, South Africa. Introduced to France, Brazil
- Thyene concinna (Keyserling, 1881) – Australia (Queensland)
- Thyene corcula (Pavesi, 1895) – Ethiopia
- Thyene coronata Simon, 1902 – Southern Africa
- Thyene dakarensis (Berland & Millot, 1941) – Senegal
- Thyene dancala Caporiacco, 1947 – Ethiopia
- Thyene decora (Simon, 1902) – Australia (Queensland)
- Thyene gangoides Prószyński & Deeleman-Reinhold, 2010 – Bali
- Thyene hemmingi (Caporiacco, 1949) – Kenya
- Thyene hesperia (Simon, 1909) – Guinea, Ivory Coast, Ghana, Nigeria
- Thyene imperialis (Rossi, 1846) – Southern Europe, North, West and East Africa, Middle East to Central Asia and China, Pakistan, India, Indonesia (type species)
- Thyene inflata (Gerstaecker, 1873) – Sub-Saharan Africa, Madagascar
- Thyene leighi G. W. Peckham & E. G. Peckham, 1903 – Kenya, Zimbabwe, Mozambique, South Africa
- Thyene longula (Simon, 1902) – Australia (Queensland)
- Thyene manipisa (Barrion & Litsinger, 1995) – Philippines
- Thyene masindi Wiśniewski & Wesołowska, 2024 – Guinea, Uganda
- Thyene mutica (Simon, 1902) – West, Central Africa, Uganda, Southern Africa
- Thyene natalii G. W. Peckham & E. G. Peckham, 1903 – Ethiopia, Kenya, Mozambique, Zimbabwe, South Africa, Eswatini
- Thyene nigriceps (Caporiacco, 1949) – Kenya
- Thyene ocellata (Thorell, 1899) – Guinea, Ivory Coast, Ghana, Nigeria, Equatorial Guinea, Gabon, Uganda, Mozambique
- Thyene ogdeni G. W. Peckham & E. G. Peckham, 1903 – Guinea, Tanzania, Mozambique, South Africa
  - T. o. nyukiensis Lessert, 1925 – East Africa
- Thyene orbicularis (Gerstaecker, 1873) – East Africa
- Thyene orientalis Żabka, 1985 – Japan, China, Vietnam
- Thyene ornata Wesołowska & Tomasiewicz, 2008 – Ethiopia
- Thyene perfecta Wiśniewski & Wesołowska, 2024 – Uganda
- Thyene phragmitigrada Metzner, 1999 – Spain, Greece
- Thyene poecila (Caporiacco, 1949) – Kenya
- Thyene punctiventer (Karsch, 1879) – Gabon
- Thyene roeweri Haddad, Wiśniewski & Wesołowska, 2024 – Mozambique
- Thyene rubricoronata (Strand, 1911) – Indonesia (Kei Is.)
- Thyene semiargentea (Simon, 1884) – Sudan, Uganda, Tanzania, South Africa
- Thyene sexplagiata (Simon, 1909) – São Tomé and Príncipe
- Thyene similis Wesołowska & van Harten, 2002 – Yemen (Socotra)
- Thyene splendida Caporiacco, 1939 – Ethiopia
- Thyene striatipes (Caporiacco, 1939) – East Africa
- Thyene subsplendens Caporiacco, 1947 – Eritrea
- Thyene tamatavi (Vinson, 1863) – Madagascar
- Thyene thyenioides (Lessert, 1925) – Kenya, Tanzania, Zimbabwe, South Africa
- Thyene triangula Xie & Peng, 1995 – China
- Thyene typica Jastrzebski, 2006 – Nepal
- Thyene varians G. W. Peckham & E. G. Peckham, 1901 – Madagascar
- Thyene verdieri (Berland & Millot, 1941) – Guinea, Uganda
- Thyene villiersi Berland & Millot, 1941 – Ivory Coast
- Thyene vittata Simon, 1902 – Ethiopia, South Africa
- Thyene volombavatanany Murray, Escobar-Toledo & Pett, 2024 – Madagascar
- Thyene xingrenensis C. Wang, Mi & Peng, 2023 – China
- Thyene yuxiensis Xie & Peng, 1995 – Nepal, China
- Thyene zhangi (Peng, Yin, Yan & Kim, 1998) – China
