= Trite simoni =

Scientific classification
- Kingdom: Animalia
- Phylum: Arthropoda
- Subphylum: Chelicerata
- Class: Arachnida
- Order: Araneae
- Infraorder: Araneomorphae
- Family: Salticidae
- Genus: Trite
- Species: T. simoni

Binomial name
- Trite simoni Patoleta, 2014

Species of jumping spider

Trite simoni is a species of jumping spider in the genus Trite that lives in New Caledonia. It lives in forests of Araucaria trees. It is a small spider, with a forward section or cephalothorax that ranges in length between 2.06 and 2.23 mm (0.08 and 0.09 in) and, behind it, an abdomen that is between 2.32 and 2.67 mm (0.09 and 0.11 in) in length. Its carapace, the top of its cephalothorax, is dark brown with black areas around its eyes. Underneath, it is greyish-brown, Its abdomen has a whitish or whitish-grey pattern. Its back tooth has five cusps. It can be most easily distinguished from other species in the genus by its copulatory organs, particularly the wing-shaped margins around the depressions on the female's epigyne and the shape of the male's tegulum. The species was first described in 2014.

== Taxonomy ==
Trite simoni is a species of jumping spider, a member of the family Salticidae, that was first described by the arachnologist Barbara Maria Patoleta in 2014. She allocated it to the genus Trite, first circumscribed by Eugène Simon in 1885. The genus is split into two groups; the species is a member of the planiceps group.

Trite is a member of the subfamily Triteae. In Wayne Maddison's 2015 study of spider phylogenetic classification, the genus Trite was allocated to the tribe Viciriini. This is a member of the subclade Astioida in the clade Salticoida. It is closely related to the genera Hyllus and Plexippus. Analysis of protein-coding genes showed it was particularly related to Telamonia. In the following year, in 2016, Prószyński added the genus to a group of genera named Evarchines, named after the genus, along with Hasarinella and Nigorella based on similarities in the spiders' copulatory organs.

== Description ==
Trite simoni is a small spider with a body is divided into two main parts: an oval cephalothorax and an egg-shaped abdomen. The male has a brown cephalothorax that measures typically 2.23 mm (0.09 in) long and 1.67 mm (0.07 in) wide. The carapace, the hard upper part of the cephalothorax, is dark brown with a pattern of faint lines radiating from a central hard patch, or fovea. Its eyes are surrounded by black areas with a fringe of orange and white hairs visible at the front. There are also a few white hairs on the main part of the carapace and on its sides. The underside of its cephalothorax, or sternum, is greyish-brown. Its chelicerae are brown and slender with a bobbly surface while its fangs has an appendage that has an unusual shape. There is a single tooth to the front and another to the back, the latter with five cusps. Its other mouthparts, its labium and maxillae are also brown. The spider's face, or clypeus, is narrow, brown and covered in white hairs.

The male has an abdomen that is longer and narrower than its carapace, measuring 2.32 mm (0.09 in) long and 1.26 mm (0.05 in) wide. The top of its abdomen is brown with a pattern of white patches and is covered in white hairs. The bottom of its abdomen is greyish-brown with lighter stripes along its sides. The spider has brown spinnerets and light brown pedipalps. Its front legs are generally brown while its remaining legs are lighter brown; they are all spiny.

The spider has a distinctive copulatory organs with a dorsal spine visible on its pedipalps and a short hooked protrusion on its palpal tibia, or tibial apophysis. The male has a thin and hairy cymbium that extends beyond a slightly hooked embolus that extends from the top of the tegulum. The palpal bulb is rounded with a large protrusion extending from the side upwards. It is the spider's copulatory organs that most help identify it. It is the shape of the tegulum, the shorter embolus and the thicker tibial apophysis that helps distinguish it from the related Trite pennata and Trite planiceps.

The female has a cephalothorax that is typically 2.06 mm (0.08 in) in length and 1.56 mm (0.06 in) wide. It has dark brown carapace with black areas surrounding its eyes like the male. However, there are also orange hairs around the female's eyes and a small patch of white hairs at the rear of its carapace. Its sternum is greyish-brown. It has three hairs protruding from its clypeus, which is narrow like the male, and its brown chelicerae also have two teeth, the rearmost similarly having five cusps. Its abdomen is typically 2.67 mm (0.11 in) in length and 1.58 mm (0.06 in) wide. The top of its abdomen is covered with a scattering of brown hairs and has a whitish-grey pattern. The bottom of its abdomen is whitish. Unlike the male, its legs are all light brown.

The female's copulatory organs also help distinguish it from other members of the genus. Its epigyne, the external visible part of its copulatory organs, has distinctive wing-shaped margins to its depressions. There is also a pocket to the rear of its epigyne. In between, two copulatory openings lead via relatively short and direct copulatory ducts to pear-shaped spermathecae, or receptacles, that are surrounded by relatively large accessory glands.

== Distribution and habitat ==
Trite spiders are found across New Caledonia, New Zealand and other Pacific Islands. Trite simoni lives on the New Caledonia mainland and Maré Island, one of the Loyalty Islands. The male holotype for the species was found in 1986 near Yahoué at an altitude of less than 100 m (330 ft) above sea level. The spider lives in forests of Araucaria trees. The species mainly lives on tree branches.
