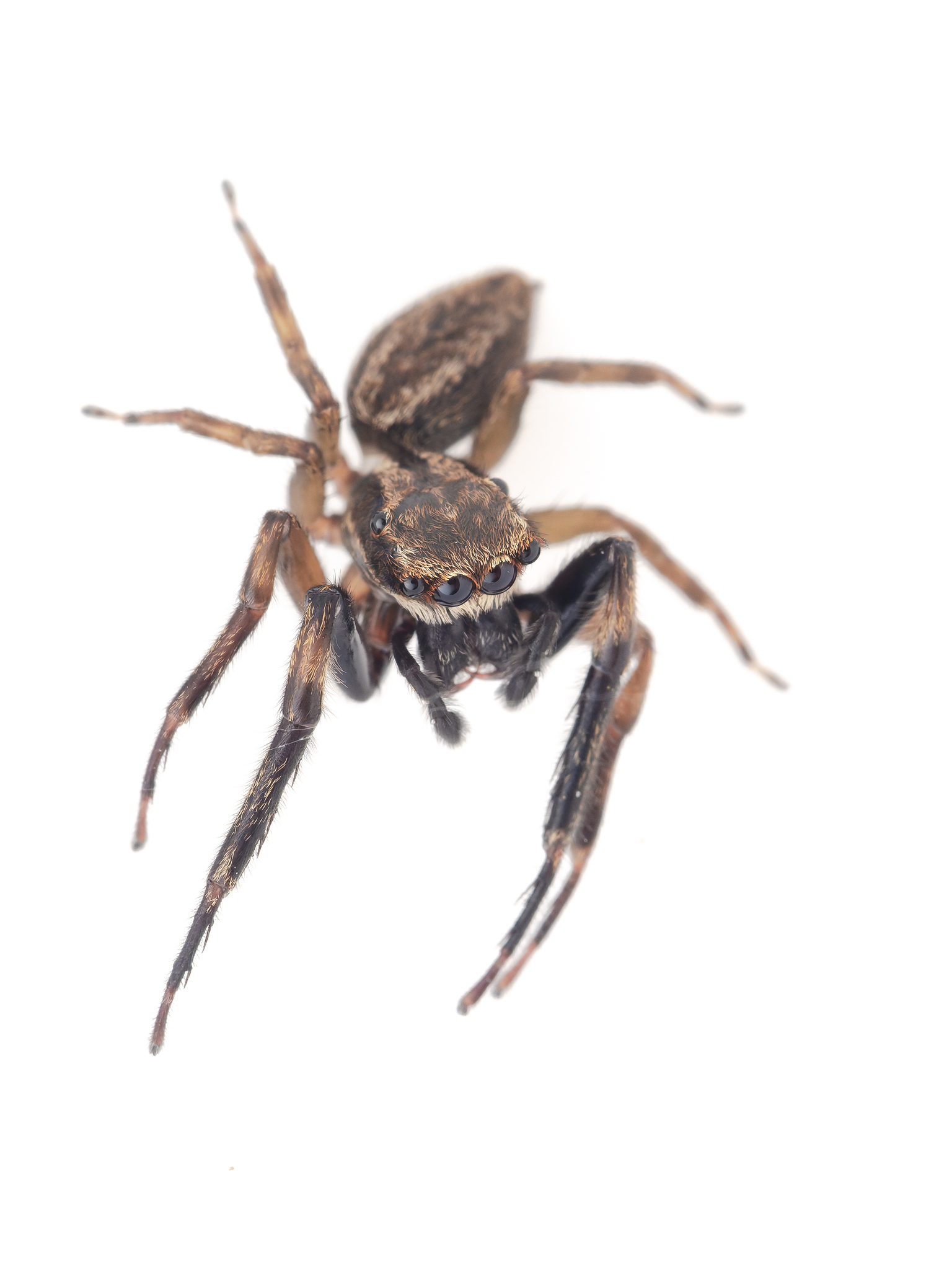

Conservation status
- Not Threatened (NZ TCS)

Scientific classification
- Kingdom: Animalia
- Phylum: Arthropoda
- Subphylum: Chelicerata
- Class: Arachnida
- Order: Araneae
- Infraorder: Araneomorphae
- Family: Salticidae
- Genus: Trite
- Species: T. auricoma

Binomial name
- Trite auricoma (Urquhart, 1886)

Synonyms
- Synonymy: Attus auricomus Urquhart, 1886; Plexippus capillatus Urquhart, 1890; Attus suffuscus Urquhart, 1893; Attus kirkii Urquhart, 1893; Attus adustus Urquhart, 1893; Trite vafra Dalmas, 1917

= Trite auricoma =

Species of spider

Trite auricoma, commonly known as the golden-brown jumping spider, is a species of jumping spider endemic to New Zealand. It was first described in 1886 by Arthur Urquhart and has undergone numerous revisions. They can reach up to 8.8 mm (0.35 in) in length and the males have a yellow clypeal band that resembles a mustache. They are common and widely distributed throughout New Zealand, where they often live in Phormium and Cordyline vegetation. They are carnivores that actively hunt their prey and can be selective about what they chose to eat. Their hunting behaviour can be broken down into three phases: orientation, pursuits and capture. After hatching from eggs, they remain in the eggsac for a time until they moult into their second instar. T. auricoma are also a host of spider hunting wasps, such as Priocnemis, which paralyses and feeds the spider to its larvae. Under the New Zealand Threat Classification System, the species is categorised as "Not Threatened".

== Taxonomy ==
Trite auricoma was first described by Arthur Urquhart in 1886 as Attus auricomus (Urquhart, 1886). Urquhart proceeded to unknowingly describe T. auricoma several more times as Plexippus capillatus, Attus suffuscus, Attus kirkii and Attus adustus. These were described in 1893 except for P. capillatus, which was described in 1890. In 1917, Raymond Comte de Dalmas described it as a separate species, Trite vafra, from samples he collected with Eugène Simon after visiting New Zealand from 1912 to 1913. In 1935, after examining type specimens from Canterbury Museum, Elizabeth Bryant placed A. auricomus in the Trite genus and renamed the species as T. auricoma. Bryant also recognized P. capillatus, A. suffuscus, A. kirkii, A. adustus and T. vafra as synonyms of T. auricoma. The species was redescribed again in 1988 by Marek Michał Żabka. T. auricoma are sometimes commonly referred to as the "golden-brown jumping spider".

== Description ==
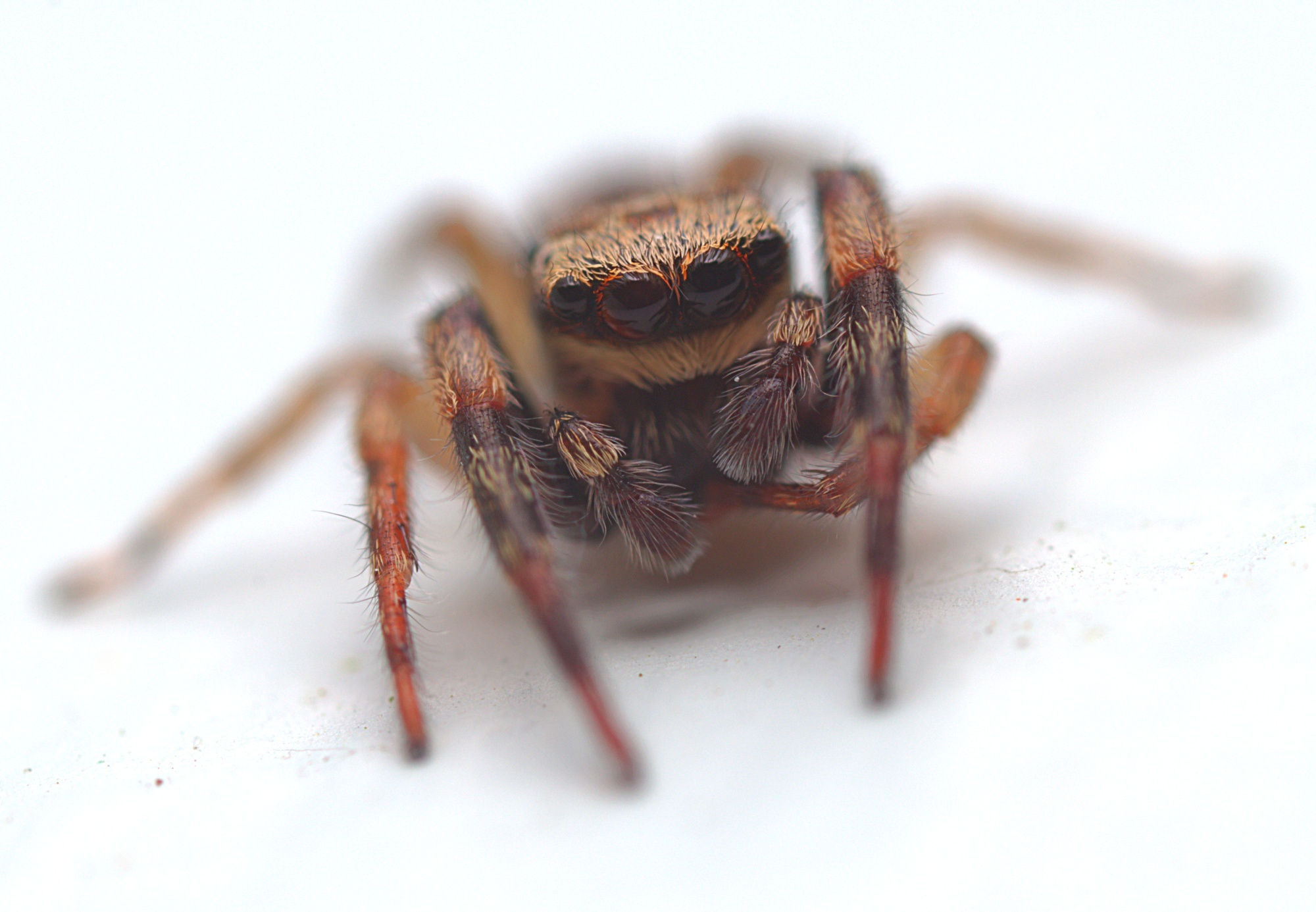
Trite auricoma with clypeal band "mustache" that identifies it as an adult male.

Adults are 8.4–8.8 mm (0.33–0.35 in) in length. In the male, the cephalothorax (the fused head and thorax of the spider) is coloured brown, with the area around the eyes black and with a light brown area on top. It is also covered in whitish setae (hair-like structures). When mature, males have a yellow clypeal band that resembles a mustache, a feature which is not present in females. The cephalothorax also has a broad rectangular shape. For the first pair of legs, the patella and tarsi are coloured light brown. The other segments of leg 1 are dark brown. The other legs are somewhat smaller. These legs are yellow orange at the base of each segment and dark orange at the end. All of the legs are covered in setae. The abdomen is greyish brown down its upper surface. The palpal bulb (male reproductive structure) has a short embolus, long and narrow tibial apophysis that angles towards the hollow section of the cymbium. The female epigynum (female reproductive structure) has rather short copulatory canals which feed into spermatheca that are dual chambered and shaped like kidneys. The epigastric furrow has depression on its side. The second instar is 1.75 mm (0.069 in) in length (before feeding). The abdomen is pinkish and distended after feeding.

== Distribution and habitat ==
Trite auricoma are widely distributed throughout New Zealand, including offshore islands such as the Poor Knights Islands and Three Kings Islands. They can often be found in rolled up leaves of flax (Phormium) or underneath dropped cabbage tree (Cordyline) leaves. T. auricoma can also be found underneath stones, in vegetation and also on the ground.

== Diet ==
Like all spiders, Trite auricoma are an obligate carnivore. In experimental conditions, T. auricoma became more selective about prey choice as the spider matured, feeding on small flies such as Drosophila whilst ignoring prey such as collembola and mites. They are also capable of learning which prey items to avoid. It has been reported that juveniles will only eat slaters once, but then never again. If the recently emerged juveniles are starved, then feeding on water will cause them to die due to the sudden change of tissue tonicity.

== Life history ==
After mating, females build 1 to 4 egg sacs covered in silk. After the eggs hatch, the 1st instar spiders remain in the cocoon for 24-28 days until ecdysis begins. After ecdysis, the second instar spiders leave the cocoon. After leaving the cocoon, they enter an exploratory phase and won’t immediately begin hunting. During this phase, they begin laying down a drag line, a behaviour which is continued into adulthood. This phase ends with the spiderling seeking cover to hide in. They have a high mortality rate during second instar. In one study, only 52% of second instars were able to catch prey in the first week whilst the remainder died. Of those successful in catching prey, 83% reached the third instar stage. Prey was most often consumed early on during the second instar, with the amount eaten declining towards the end of the stage. The length of instar period is determined by the amount of food eaten by the spiders early in the instar period, with more food resulting in a shorter instar stage. The period of time when the second instar is actively feeding is recorded lasting 9 to 26 days. Hunting behaviour ceases for roughly 12.4 days when the spiderling prepares to undergo and begins ecdysis. While undergoing ecdysis, the spiderling hides in a silk retreat.

== Behaviour ==
=== Hunting ===
Like most Salticidae, Trite auricoma is a visual predator. As spiderlings, they can detect movement up to 25cm (10 in) away, but when they mature into adults this increases to 75cm (30 in). Hunger is thought to initiate hunting behaviour. Juveniles rarely catch prey on their first attempt, but slowly improve with each successful prey capture. Juveniles usually miss their prey the first few times they hunt.

The hunting behaviour of T. auricoma can be broken down into three stages: "orientation", "pursuits" and "capture". In the “orientation” stage, the spider shifts itself so it is directly facing prey. This stage is broken down into three substages: “alert”, “swivel” and “alignment”. The “alert” substage begins upon detecting prey. The legs tighten and the cephalothorax is raised. It then freezes for several seconds. In the “swivel” substage, the spider maneuvers its cephalothorax to face the prey while the abdomen remains in place. Then, in the “alignment” substage the abdomen is shifted into place with its cephalothorax and the legs are reorientated.

The next stage is “pursuit”, in which the spider attempts to get closer to the prey. This stage consists of “follow”, “run” and “stalk” substages, any of which may be used. In the “follow” substage, the spider matches the movement speed of its prey. This occurs when the prey is fast-moving. In the “run” substage, the spider moves faster and catches up to the prey. The “stalk” substage is when the spider makes very slow movements towards the prey.

In the final “capture” stage, the spider finally grabs the prey. It is broken down into three substages: “pre-crouch”, “crouch” and “jump”. In the “pre-crouch” substage, the spider stops moving and spreads its legs out. This is followed up by the “crouch” substage in which the third pair of legs are shifted forwards, which only occurs if the prey is still stationary. Then, the “jump” substage begins, in which the spider pounces on its prey and impales it with its fangs.

=== Interactions with conspecifics ===
T. auricoma do not react to each other while they are in the egg sac. However, once they have emerged, confrontations between juveniles result in one or both spiders raising their front legs. At this point, both spiders back away. Juveniles live alone in their silk retreats, but have on occasion been found with conspecifics.

== Parasites ==
Trite auricoma has been observed being parasitized by several species of Priocnemis, a genus of spider wasp which uses its venom to paralyse the spider and drag it back to the wasp's burrow. Once there, the paralysed spider is slowly eaten by the wasp's larvae. They are also used as hosts by Epipompilus insularis, another species of spider wasp. E. insularis runs at the spider, temporarily paralyses it and then directly lays eggs on it. The paralysis is short, so the spider is able to recover and is able to move around normally. After the eggs hatch, the larvae begin to feed on the live spider, eventually killing it. The adult wasp sometimes targets females that are guarding eggs in their nest (which may ensure the larvae have some protection).

== Conservation status ==
In 2020, under the New Zealand Threat Classification System, this species was listed as "Not Threatened". It was previously listed in the same category in a 2012 report.
