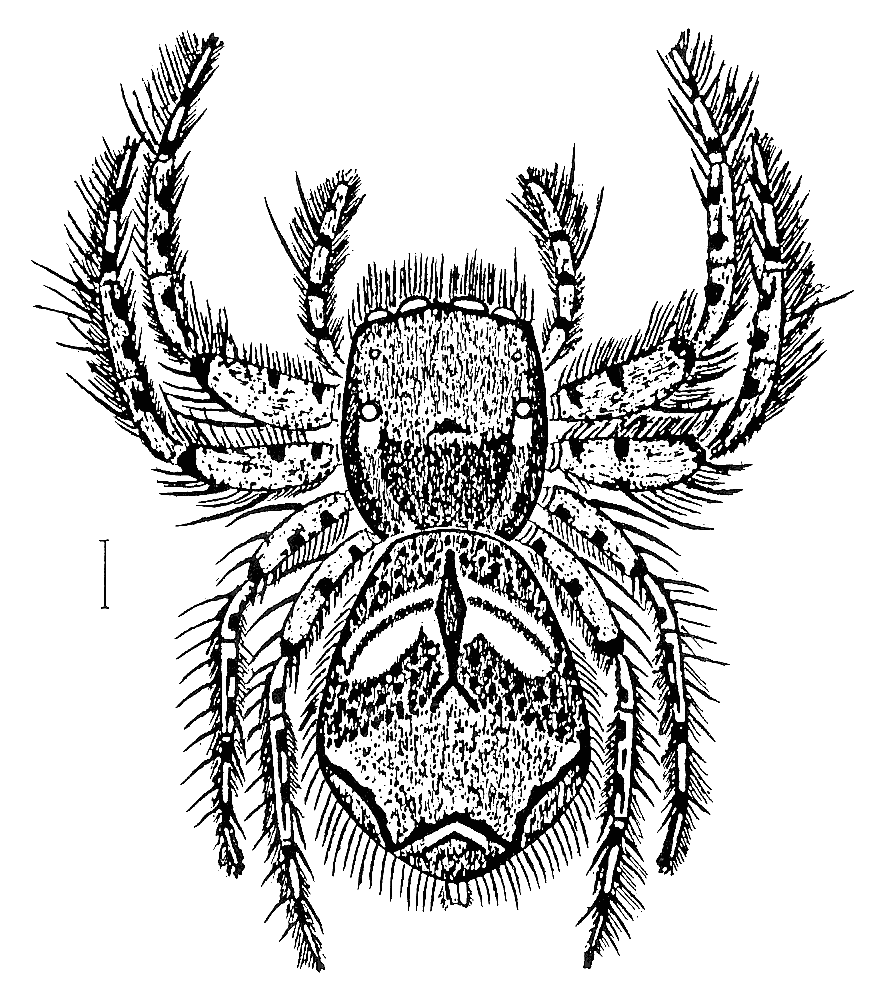
- female
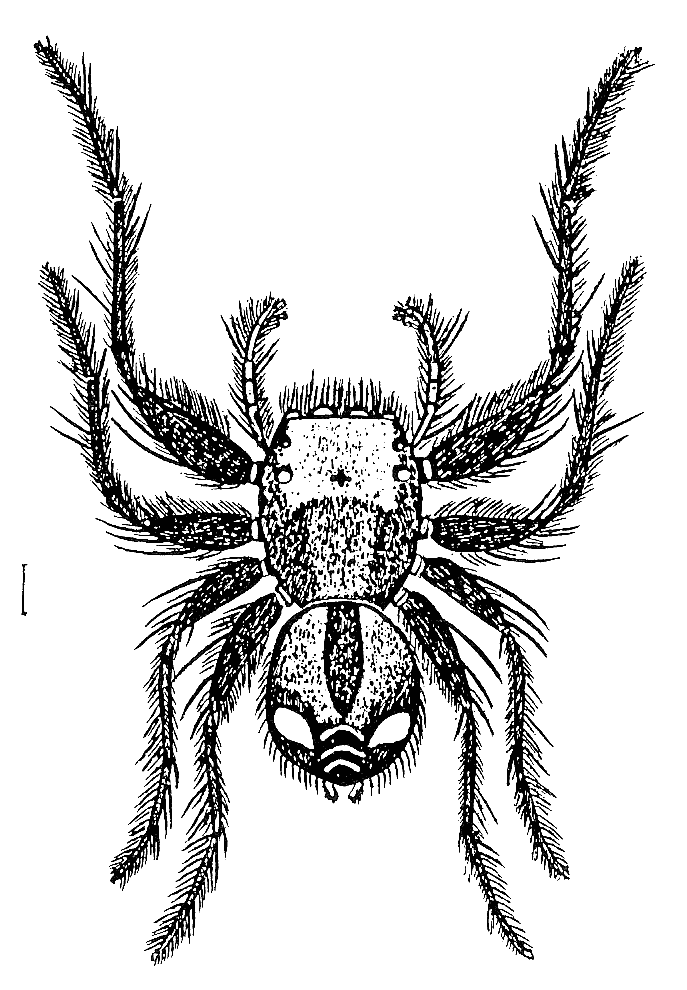
- male

Scientific classification
- Kingdom: Animalia
- Phylum: Arthropoda
- Subphylum: Chelicerata
- Class: Arachnida
- Order: Araneae
- Infraorder: Araneomorphae
- Family: Salticidae
- Genus: Servaea
- Species: S. vestita

Binomial name
- Servaea vestita (L. Koch, 1879)

Synonyms
- Scaea vestita L. Koch, 1879 (genus name preoccupied); Plexippus validus Urquhart, 1893 (preoccupied)

= Servaea vestita =

Species of spider

Servaea vestita is a species of jumping spider from Australia. It is found in Queensland, New South Wales and Tasmania.

== Taxonomy ==
The species was first described by Ludwig Koch in 1879, as Scaea vestita. However, the genus name Scaea had already been used, so in 1888, Eugène Simon published the replacement name Servaea, and the species became Servaea vestita. In 2012, Richardson and Gunter synonymized the species with Servaea incana. This was rejected by Jerzy Prószyński in 2017, a view accepted by the World Spider Catalog as of February 2021.

face view of male
