= Epipompilus aztecus =

Scientific classification
- Kingdom: Animalia
- Phylum: Arthropoda
- Clade: Pancrustacea
- Class: Insecta
- Order: Hymenoptera
- Family: Pompilidae
- Subfamily: Pepsinae
- Genus: Epipompilus
- Species: E. aztecus

Binomial name
- Epipompilus aztecus (Cresson 1869)

Synonyms
- Ferreola azteca Cresson, 1869; Epipompilus maximliani Kohl, 1884; Aulocostethus aztecus Bradley, 1944

Species of wasp

Epipompilus aztecus is a Neotropical spider wasp belonging to the Pompilid subfamily Ctenocerinae.

== Description ==
The wasp is black and reddish brown in color.

== Distribution ==
The distribution of Epipompilus aztecus spans from southern Mexico to Mato Grosso do Sul in Brazil, and eastwards to the Atlantic Forest (biome).

== Habitat ==
The Epipompilus aztecus lives primarily in Tropical deciduous forests.
