= Trite guilberti =

Scientific classification
- Kingdom: Animalia
- Phylum: Arthropoda
- Subphylum: Chelicerata
- Class: Arachnida
- Order: Araneae
- Infraorder: Araneomorphae
- Family: Salticidae
- Genus: Trite
- Species: T. guilberti

Binomial name
- Trite guilberti Patoleta, 2014

Species of jumping spider

Trite guilberti is a species of jumping spider that lives in New Caledonia. A member of the genus Trite, it lives in forests of Araucaria trees. It is a small spider, with a forward section or cephalothorax that is typically 2.1 mm (0.08 in) and, behind it, an abdomen that is typically 2 mm (0.08 in) long. Its carapace, the top of its cephalothorax, is brown with darker brown areas around its eyes. The top of its abdomen is brown and marked with a series of white stripes. Underneath, it has a lighter brown cephalothorax and a greyish abdomen. Its back tooth has four or five cusps. The male was first described in 2014. The female has not been described. It can be most easily distinguished from other species in the genus by its copulatory organs, particularly the shape of the male's embolus.

== Taxonomy ==
Trite guilberti is a species of jumping spider, a member of the family Salticidae, that was first described by the arachnologist Barbara Maria Patoleta in 2014. She allocated it to the genus Trite, first circumscribed by Eugène Simon in 1885. The genus is split into two groups; the species is a member of the planiceps group. Its specific name is derived from the name of the person that collected some of the first specimen of the species, Éric Guilbert.

Trite is a member of the subfamily Triteae. In Wayne Maddison's 2015 study of spider phylogenetic classification, the genus Trite was moved to the subtribe Viciriini. This is a member of the tribe Viciriini, in the subclade Astioida in the clade Salticoida. It is closely related to the genera Hyllus and Plexippus. Analysis of protein-coding genes showed it was particularly related to Telamonia. In the following year, in 2016, Prószyński added the genus to a group of genera named Evarchines, named after the genus, along with Hasarinella and Nigorella based on similarities in the spiders' copulatory organs.

== Description ==
Trite guilberti is a small spider with a body divided into two main parts: an oval forward section, or cephalothorax and, behind that, an egg-shaped abdomen. Only the male has been identified. It has a cephalothorax that is typically 2.1 mm (0.08 in) long and 1.6 mm (0.06 in) wide. Its carapace, the hard upper part of the cephalothorax, is brown, covered in white hairs and has a pattern of faint lines radiating from a central hard patch, or fovea. There is also a fringe of orange hairs at the front of the carapace and white hairs on its side. Its eyes are surrounded with a dark brown area. The underside of its cephalothorax, or sternum, is light brown. Its chelicerae are brown and slender with a bobbly surface while its fang has an appendage that has an unusual shape. There is a single tooth to the front and another to the back, the latter with between four and five cusps. Its other mouthparts, its labium and maxillae are also brown, its maxillae being marked with an unusual appendage. The spider's face, or clypeus, is narrow, brown and covered in white hairs.

The male has an abdomen that is smaller and narrower than its carapace, typically measuring 2 mm (0.08 in) long and 1.25 mm (0.05 in) wide. The top of its abdomen is brown with a pattern of white stripes that run from the front to the back on its back and running along its sides. The bottom of its abdomen is greyish. The spider has light brown spinnerets. Its front legs are generally brown while its remaining legs are lighter brown; there are spines on the front two pairs of legs.

The spider has a distinctive copulatory organs with a dorsal spine visible on its light brown pedipalps and a short hooked tibial apophysis, a protrusion on its short light brown palpal tibia. The male has a thin and hairy cymbium that is longer and wider than the palpal bulb. The palpal bulb includes a long thin tegulum that contains a hook-shaped semination duct. Its long thin embolus extends from the bottom of the tegulum and, after initially passing outside the cymbium, curves around until it passes over the tegulum. Despite its length, it does not pass outside the top of the cymbium. It is the spider's copulatory organs that most help identify it, particularly the shape of its embolus and the path it takes. The female has not been described.

== Distribution and habitat ==
Trite spiders are found across New Caledonia, New Zealand and other Pacific Islands. Trite guilberti lives on the New Caledonia mainland. The male holotype for the species was found in 1986 near Rivière Bleue. The species is particularly active at night. It mainly lives in the tree branches of humid forests.
