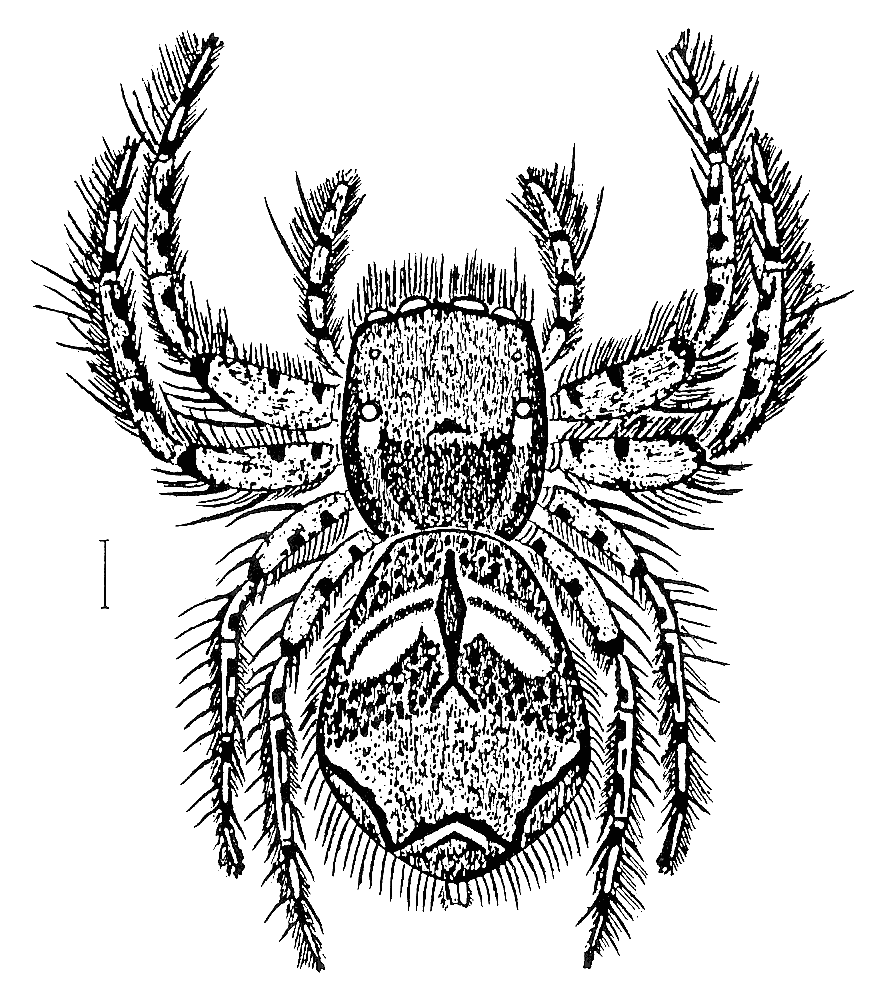
- female S. vestita

Scientific classification
- Kingdom: Animalia
- Phylum: Arthropoda
- Subphylum: Chelicerata
- Class: Arachnida
- Order: Araneae
- Infraorder: Araneomorphae
- Family: Salticidae
- Subfamily: Salticinae
- Genus: Servaea; Simon, 1888

Type species
- S. incana (Karsch, 1878)

Species
- 8, see text

= Servaea =

Genus of spiders

Servaea is a genus of jumping spiders that was first described by Eugène Louis Simon in 1888. S. murina females are about 8 millimetres (0.31 in) long.

== Species ==
As of August 2019 it contains eight species found in Australia, with one species reported from Java:

- Servaea incana (Karsch, 1878) (type) – Australia (New South Wales)
- Servaea melaina Richardson & Gunter, 2012 – Australia (Western Australia)
- Servaea murina Simon, 1902 – Indonesia (Java)
- Servaea narraweena Richardson & Gunter, 2012 – Eastern Australia
- Servaea spinibarbis Simon, 1909 – Australia (Western Australia)
- Servaea vestita (L. Koch, 1879) – Australia (Queensland, New South Wales, Tasmania)
- Servaea villosa (Keyserling, 1881) – Australia (Queensland, New South Wales, Australian Capital Territory)
- Servaea zabkai Richardson & Gunter, 2012 – Australia (Queensland)
