= Servaea murina =

Scientific classification
- Kingdom: Animalia
- Phylum: Arthropoda
- Subphylum: Chelicerata
- Class: Arachnida
- Order: Araneae
- Infraorder: Araneomorphae
- Family: Salticidae
- Genus: Servaea
- Species: S. murina

Binomial name
- Servaea murina Simon, 1902

Species of spider

Servaea murina is the only species of the jumping spider genus Servaea found outside of Australia. It is endemic to Java.

== Description ==
The species is described from the female only, which is about 8 mm long. The carapace is longish and mainly black, with a silky yellow pubescence and some long black hairs. The flattish broad oval abdomen is brownish with variable dark marks and a silky yellow pubescence. The first pair of legs is dark brown, the others are yellow with dark rings. All show the same yellow pubescence and long hairs.

== Name ==
The species name murina is derived from Latin mus "mouse".
