= Trite parvula =

Conservation status
- Not Threatened (NZ TCS)

Scientific classification
- Kingdom: Animalia
- Phylum: Arthropoda
- Subphylum: Chelicerata
- Class: Arachnida
- Order: Araneae
- Infraorder: Araneomorphae
- Family: Salticidae
- Genus: Trite
- Species: T. parvula

Binomial name
- Trite parvula (Bryant, 1935)

Synonyms
- Euophrys parvula

Species of spider

Trite parvula, commonly known as the house hopper spider, is a small and relatively common jumping spider (Salticidae) endemic to New Zealand.

== Classification ==
The species was first described by American arachnologist Elizabeth B. Bryant in 1935. She placed it in the genus 'Evophrys', now known usually as Euophrys, but did so hesitantly, as particular proportions of the legs were different from all the other species in that genus.

In 2017, it was one of fifteen species of Trite.

== Distribution and habitat ==
It lives throughout the North Island and the top half of the South Island down to Christchurch. It often lives inside houses and is seen sunning itself on walls, fences and garden plants.

== Conservation status ==
Under the New Zealand Threat Classification System, this species is listed as "Not Threatened".
