= Servaea narraweena =

Scientific classification
- Kingdom: Animalia
- Phylum: Arthropoda
- Subphylum: Chelicerata
- Class: Arachnida
- Order: Araneae
- Infraorder: Araneomorphae
- Family: Salticidae
- Genus: Servaea
- Species: S. narraweena

Binomial name
- Servaea narraweena Richardson & Gunter, 2012

Species of jumping spider

Servaea narraweena is a species of small jumping spider found in south eastern Australia. The prey is small arthropods.
