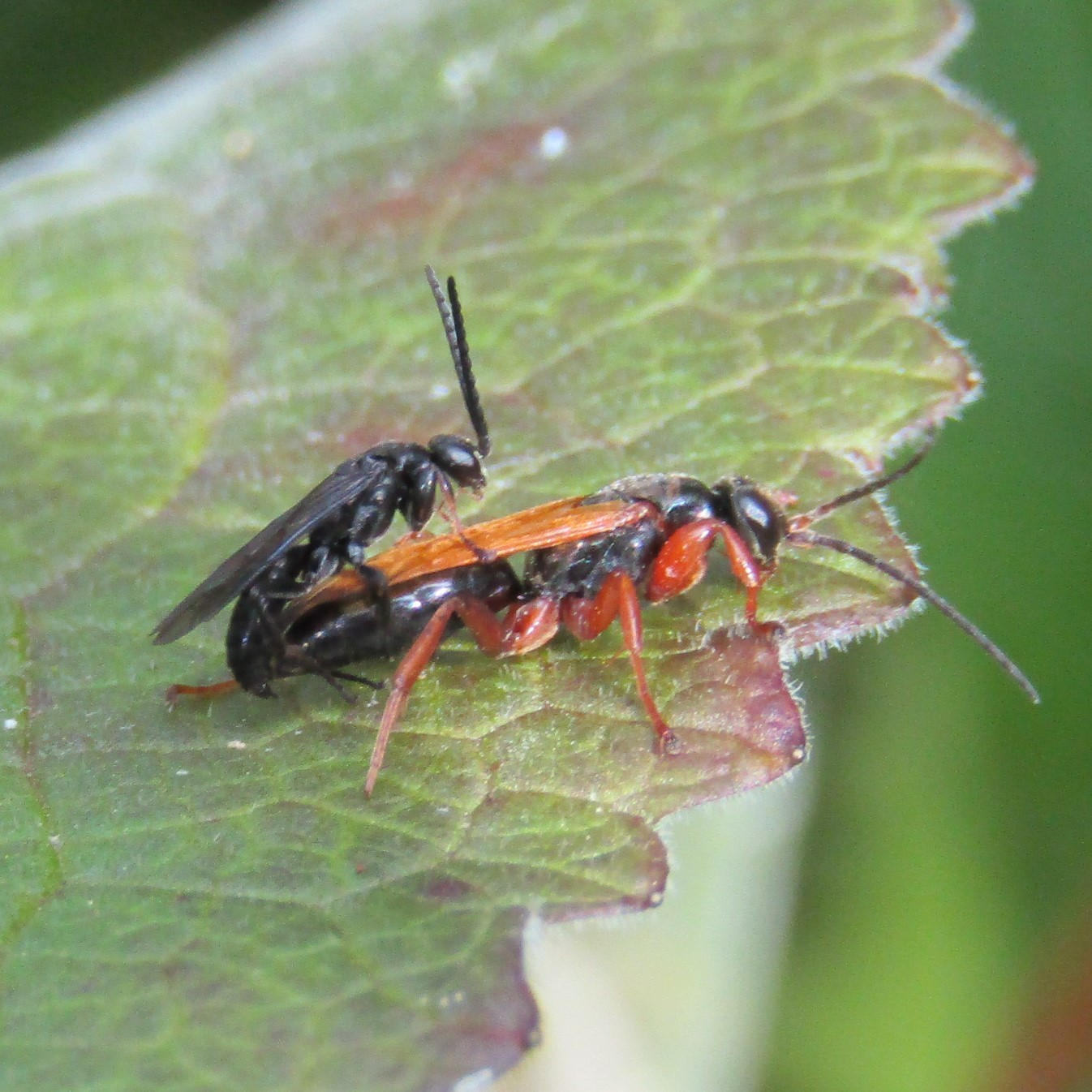
- Male and female of the species

Scientific classification
- Domain: Eukaryota
- Kingdom: Animalia
- Phylum: Arthropoda
- Class: Insecta
- Order: Hymenoptera
- Family: Pompilidae
- Genus: Epipompilus
- Species: E. insularis

Binomial name
- Epipompilus insularis Kohl, 1884

= Epipompilus insularis =

Species of wasp

Epipompilus insularis is a species of spider wasp which is endemic to New Zealand and it is the only species of the genus Epipompilus found in New Zealand.

== Description ==
A relatively small, mainly black spider wasp with yellowish tinged wings, which have a variable amount of dark colour at the tips. Females are around 6.0-8.8mm in length, males 3.5 -5.6mm. In females there is an orange-red band on the pronotum and this reduces in extent as one move southwards in New Zealand, until it is barely visible in specimens from latitude 42°S, other coloured parts of the female such as the antennae bases also reduce in coloration the further south the specimen is obtained. Males are far less variable. This pattern appears to be an example of Allen's rule and is seen in other New Zealand Pompilids but is less marked in E. insularis due to its greater extent of sexual dimorphism with the males always being more uniformly dark.

== Biology ==
E. insularis females hunt, usually in sunshine for retreat-making spiders in the concealed places where female spiders retreat to, such as rolled dead leaves; hollow plant stems; flax bushes; dead rolled fronds of tree-ferns; the abandoned cocoons of the bag-moth Liothula omnivora; deserted galleries of wood-boring beetles; and even the empty hatched galls of the moth Morova subfasciata in Muehlenbeckia australis and beneath loose bark on tree trunks. When she finds a female prey spider the female E. insularis runs at it and as the spider lifts its legs to adopt a defensive posture she stings it and lays her egg before moving away. The paralysis is light and the host usually recovers quickly and resumes movement. E. insularis does not normally build a nest but the host is usually parasitised on or near its retreat or some time after being parasitised spins its own retreat, the wasp larva being quite tolerant of the host spider's movement. If the host was gravid any eggs laid may be eaten by the wasp larva as well as the host herself.

Prey species are known to come from a number of genera of spiders including Trite and Clubiona.

== Taxonomy ==
E. insularis was placed by Evans in the subgenus Epipompiloides due to the structure of the male's subgenital plate which is very similar to that of E. bushi. This latter species is from southern Australia but in 1972 Evans stated that the subgenera of the Australian and Papuan Epipompilus are of dubious validity. E. australis is the type species of the genus Epipompilus.
