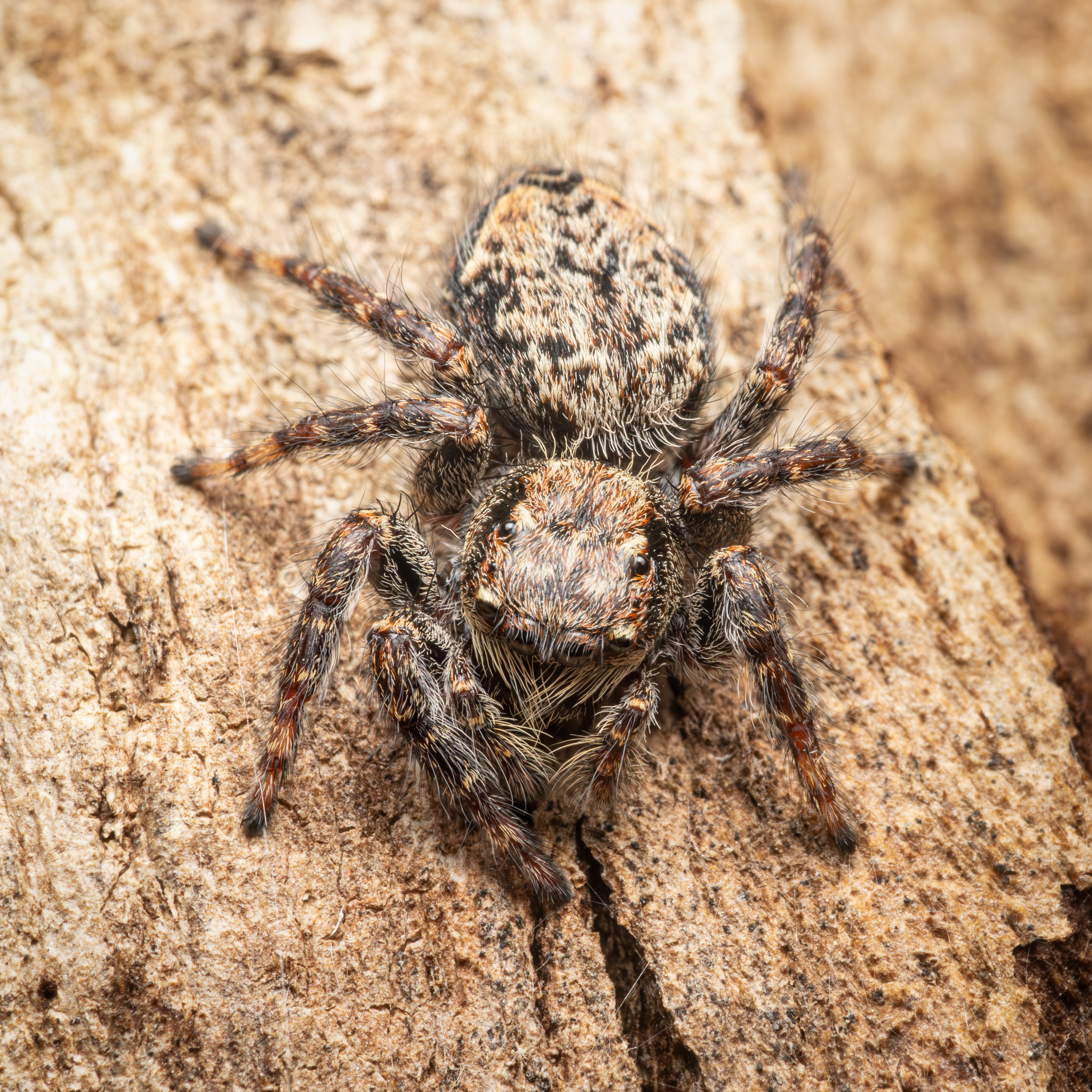

Scientific classification
- Kingdom: Animalia
- Phylum: Arthropoda
- Subphylum: Chelicerata
- Class: Arachnida
- Order: Araneae
- Infraorder: Araneomorphae
- Family: Salticidae
- Genus: Servaea
- Species: S. incana

Binomial name
- Servaea incana (Karsch, 1878)

= Servaea incana =

Species of jumping spider

Servaea incana is a species of jumping spider found in temperate regions throughout Australia, especially around the coast. It is nocturnal and known to nest under loose bark on the trunks of eucalypt trees.

It preys upon small arthropods, especially ants.

== Description ==
Adult females range in size from 6.9 to 10 mm, whilst males range from 5.4 to 10.3 mm. Males are usually darker in colour, greyish, although there is some variation in colouration, patterns and markings. Juveniles are morphologically similar to females, being pale to dark brown in colour.

=== Male ===
Cephalothorax mid to dark orange in colour, with scattered grey hairs dorsally and laterally. Clypeus narrow, sternum yellow to orange. Dorsally, the abdomen is yellow to light brown, with variable orange, dark brown, or black patterns. Spinnerets yellow to brown. Ventrally, the abdomen is the same colour as the dorsal part, but with a darker median patch. Palps brown.

It was found that males that mature at the beginning of the year tend to be larger than those maturing nearer to the end of the year.

=== Female ===
Cephalothorax yellow to a dark orange, lower margin with a gradient to a dark brown. Sternum orange, and dorsal abdomen yellow with variable dark brown/black patterns. Ventral abdomen same colour as the dorsal part, but again with a dark median patch. Spinnerets and palps both brown, and the legs are brown with banding. Spermatheca large and rounded, within the margin of the fossa.

== Biology ==
Similar to other jumping spiders, male S. incana will use visual displays as a method of courtship when facing females face-to-face, but will rely on silk-borne vibrations to communicate with females that reside within retreats or nests. Adult males who encounter subadult females at retreats may build their own retreat nearby and cohabit until the female matures into adulthood, before copulating afterwards. When moving, palps are usually held still. S. incana specimens were found to rarely jump; mainly when moving from one surface to another or when startled.

Nests range from 20 to 35 mm in length, and 15 to 25 mm in width. When a female is ready to lay eggs, they spin a much denser and larger nest, making them not visible from the outside. Sexual maturation occurs during Autumn, and, once mated, a female will rarely accept subsequent suitors, becoming more aggressive towards males.

Parasitic wasps of the genus Epipompilus may parasitise S. incana.

S. incana individuals can run horizontally up to 14.5 cm (5.7 in) per second, and climb at speeds up to 15.1 cm (5.9 in) per second. It was found that running speed increased with body size. S. incana are able to resist an upward pulling force of up to 31.1 mN, with larger spiders being able to withstand a larger force.

== Behaviour ==
The cephalothorax of a spider is usually held 1–2 mm above the surface on which it stands, and when it is raised it becomes 2–4 mm above the surface. Highly variable in terms of fang extension, from "barely perceptible" to full extension. Palps are waved in an alternating pattern, averaging 2–4 cycles per 0.5 seconds. Palps move independently whilst plucking at silk.

S. incana has numerous visual displays when faced with another spider including: wagging; quivering legs in bouts of 0.5 seconds; quivering their body; stalking other spiders, which is done in the same manner as stalking prey, only stalking whilst the other spider is faced away and pausing if the other spider faces it; and also veering and sidestepping.

Long leaps of 30–50 mm, and shorter leaps of 10–20 mm, which may be performed in up to three times in quick succession or after a longer leap, along with: charging; ramming; fending, done by females towards males; and lunging, when within 20 mm distance from the other spider, are some of the threat displays of this species.

While embraced, two spiders may: push by stepping or leaning forward; grapple, pulling the other spider's legs towards one's own; clasping; and/or decamp, by turning and running away.

A "zigzag dance" in which the male will step sideways in chain of ever-narrowing arcs is incorporated into the mating display of S. incana. In courtship, the male will raise his body with front legs and palps erect, before mounting the female from the front and turning to the opposite direction of the female. Copulation is done with the alternation of palps.

== Predation ==
S. incana prey on smaller arthropods, largely made up of ants, but also wasps, beetles, flies, and other spiders. Hunting usually involves spiders waiting on tree bark for prey to come into view, before lunging or jumping on to it.

Predators of S. incana include other spiders, mantidflies, and wasps.
