= Trite caledoniensis =

Scientific classification
- Kingdom: Animalia
- Phylum: Arthropoda
- Subphylum: Chelicerata
- Class: Arachnida
- Order: Araneae
- Infraorder: Araneomorphae
- Family: Salticidae
- Genus: Trite
- Species: T. caledoniensis

Binomial name
- Trite caledoniensis Patoleta, 2014

Species of jumping spider

Trite caledoniensis is a species of jumping spider that lives in New Caledonia. A member of the genus Trite, it lives in rainforest. It is a small spider, with a forward section or cephalothorax that is typically 2.2 mm (0.09 in) and, behind it, an abdomen that is typically 2.12 mm (0.08 in) long. Its carapace, the top of its cephalothorax, is dark brown and has a scattering of white hairs on its surface. Its abdomen is pale yellow, the top being marked with a series of brown stripes. Its back tooth has four cusps. The male was first described in 2014. The female has not been described. It can be most easily distinguished from other species in the genus by its copulatory organs, particularly the shape of the male's tibial apophysis, a protrusion on its pedipalps and the curve at the base of its, embolus.

== Taxonomy and etymology ==
Trite caledoniensis is a species of jumping spider, a member of the family Salticidae, that was first described by the arachnologist Barbara Maria Patoleta in 2014. She allocated it to the genus Trite, which had been first circumscribed by Eugène Simon in 1885. The genus is split into two groups; the species is a member of the planiceps group. Its specific name is derived from the place where it was first found.

Trite is a member of the subfamily Triteae. In Wayne Maddison's 2015 study of spider phylogenetic classification, the genus Trite was moved to the subtribe Viciriini. This is a member of the tribe Viciriini, in the subclade Astioida in the clade Salticoida. It is closely related to the genera Hyllus and Plexippus. Analysis of protein-coding genes showed it was particularly related to Telamonia. In the following year, in 2016, Prószyński added the genus to a group of genera named Evarchines, named after the genus, along with Hasarinella and Nigorella based on similarities in the spiders' copulatory organs.

== Description ==
Trite caledoniensis is a small spider with a body divided into two main parts: an oval forward section, or cephalothorax and, behind that, an egg-shaped abdomen. Only the male has been identified. It has a cephalothorax that is typically 2.2 mm (0.09 in) long and 1.6 mm (0.06 in) wide. Its carapace, the hard upper part of the cephalothorax, is dark brown with a pattern of faint lines radiating from a central hard patch, or fovea. There is also a fringe of light orange hairs at the front of the carapace and a slight scattering of white hairs on its sides. Its eyes are surrounded with a black area. The part of the underside of its cephalothorax known as its sternum is light brown. The spider's face, or clypeus, is narrow, brown and covered in long white hairs. Its chelicerae are brown and slender with spur at the front while its fangs have an appendage that has an unusual shape. There is a single tooth to the front and another to the back, the latter with four cusps. Its other mouthparts, its labium and maxillae are also brown.

The male has an abdomen that is smaller and narrower than its carapace, typically measuring 2.12 mm (0.08 in) long and 1.32 mm (0.05 in) wide. The top of its abdomen is pale yellow with a pattern of two brown stripes that run from the front to the back on its back. The bottom of its abdomen is also pale yellow. The spider has light brown spinnerets. Its front legs are generally brown while its remaining legs are lighter brown; there are spines on the front two pairs of legs.

The spider has a distinctive copulatory organs with light brown pedipalps and a short and thin hooked tibial apophysis, a protrusion on its short palpal tibia. The male has a thin and hairy cymbium that is longer and wider than the palpal bulb. The palpal bulb includes a long thin tegulum that contains a hook-shaped semination duct. Its long thin embolus that protrudes from the top. It is the spider's copulatory organs that most help identify it, particularly the shape of its tegulum, its thin tibial apophysis and the curve at the base of its embolus. Its cymbium is thinner than the majority of the other members of the genus. The female has not been described.

== Distribution and habitat ==
Trite spiders are found across New Caledonia, New Zealand and other Pacific Islands. Trite caledoniensis lives on the New Caledonia mainland. The male holotype for the species was found in 1986 near Rivière Bleue. The species is particularly active at night. It mainly lives in the tree branches of humid forests.
