= Epipompilus =

Scientific classification
- Domain: Eukaryota
- Kingdom: Animalia
- Phylum: Arthropoda
- Class: Insecta
- Order: Hymenoptera
- Family: Pompilidae
- Subfamily: Pepsinae
- Genus: Epipompilus; Kohl, 1884

Type species
- Epipompilus maximiliani Kohl, 1884

Genus of wasps

Epipompilus is a genus of spider wasps in the subfamily Pepsinae, part of the widespread family Pompilidae. Representatives of Epipompilus can be found in Australasia and North and South America. This distribution may indicate that Epipompilus evolved in Gondwana and is similar to other Gondwanan taxa such as the southern beech Nothofagus and Auracaria.

Epipompilus is found in North and South America, ranging from Argentina to extreme southern United States, with around a dozen known species. One species, E. insularis is endemic to New Zealand. In Australia, the genus reaches its greatest diversity, with a greater number of species and a more varied spectrum of morphological features than among the American species. The Epipompilus species in New Guinea are notably brilliantly coloured and apparently highly evolved species. The genus is restricted to these areas but several Tertiary fossils from the northern hemisphere should probably be placed in Epipompilus.

== Ecology and behaviour ==
These wasps are scarce in collections, probably due to their small size and the fact that they rarely visit flowers. A single male E. turneri which was collected on Leptospermum in New South Wales is one of the few flower records. In Australia observation and collection have often been associated with the trunks of living Eucalyptus trees. The morphology of many of the species suggests that they are adapted for crawling under bark and for entering crevices to search for spiders. Prey recorded includes spiders from the family Sparassidae. These wasps probably do not build nests but hunt spiders underneath bark and lay eggs on them as they find them. Taken into consideration with the many primitive structural features of members of this genus, it is suggestive that the hunting technique of Epipompilus represents an ancestral type of behaviour for spider wasps.

One of three new species identified in 2020, based on a single specimen seen in 2018, E. namadji, is named after the Namadgi National Park in the Australian Capital Territory, in which it was found. Efforts are ongoing by teams from the Australian National Insect Collection at the CSIRO to find more of the wasps, after nearly 80 per cent of the national park was lost in the 2019–20 Australian bushfire season.

== Species ==
The following species have been assigned to Epipompilus:

- Epipompilus albofasciatus Evans, 1972
- Epipompilus aztecus Cresson, 1869
- Epipompilus caeruleus Evans, 1972
- Epipompilus cardaleae Evans, 1972
- Epipompilus compactus Evans, 1972
- Epipompilus delicatus Turner, 1910
- Epipompilus depressus Evans, 1962
- Epipompilus excelsus Bradley, 1944
- Epipompilus exleyae Evans, 1972
- Epipompilus formosus Evans, 1972
- Epipompilus gilesi Turner, 1910
- Epipompilus hackeri Evans, 1972
- Epipompilus inca Evans, 1968
- Epipompilus incompletus Evans, 1972
- Epipompilus insularis Kohl, 1884
- Epipompilus jocosus Evans, 1968
- Epipompilus matthewsi Evans, 1972
- Epipompilus mirabundus Yuan & Rodriguez, 2020
- Epipompilus montivagus Evans, 1972
- Epipompilus multifasciatus Evans, 1972
- Epipompilus namadji Yuan & Rodriguez, 2020
- Epipompilus neboissi Evans, 1972
- Epipompilus nigribasis Banks, 1925
- Epipompilus pallidus Evans, 1962
- Epipompilus papuensis Evans, 1972
- Epipompilus pauper Evans, 1972
- Epipompilus pictipennis Evans, 1962
- Epipompilus pulcherrimus Evans, 1955
- Epipompilus rieki Evans, 1972
- Epipompilus submetallicus Evans, 1972
- Epipompilus taree Yuan & Rodriguez, 2020
- Epipompilus tasmanicus Evans, 1972
- Epipompilus tucumanus Evans, 1968
- Epipompilus turneri Evans, 1962
- Epipompilus variegatus Evans, 1972
