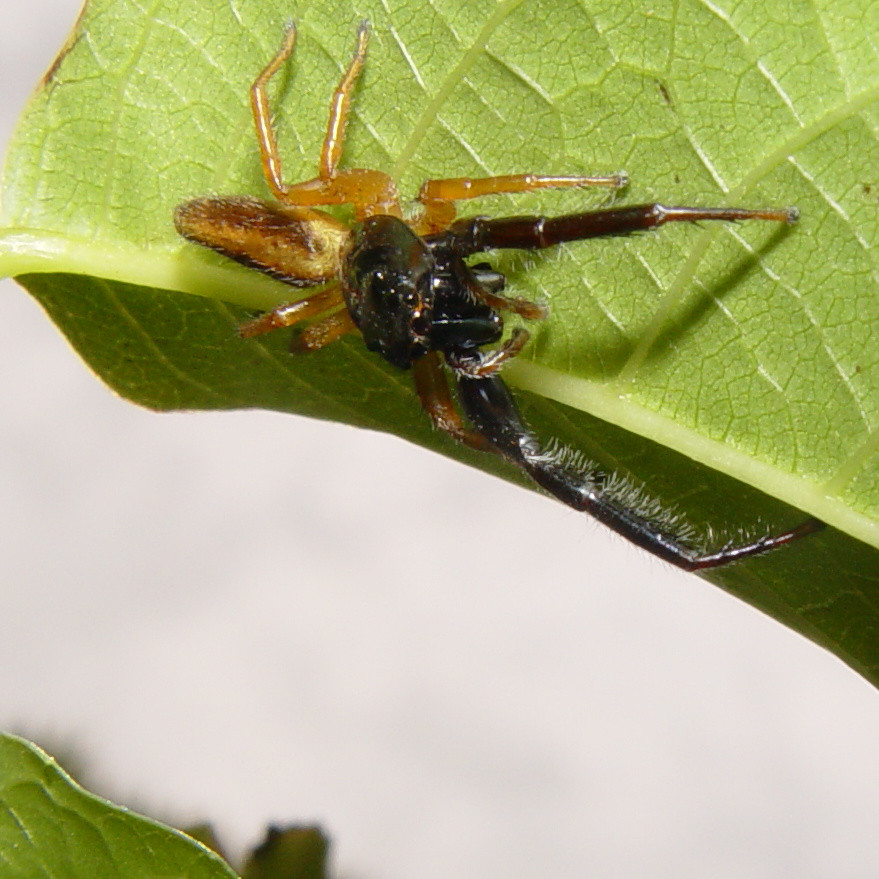

Conservation status
- Not Threatened (NZ TCS)

Scientific classification
- Kingdom: Animalia
- Phylum: Arthropoda
- Subphylum: Chelicerata
- Class: Arachnida
- Order: Araneae
- Infraorder: Araneomorphae
- Family: Salticidae
- Genus: Trite
- Species: T. planiceps

Binomial name
- Trite planiceps Simon, 1899

Synonyms
- Salticus minax Plexippus minax Trite minax Ocrisiona leucocomis

= Trite planiceps =

Species of spider endemic to New Zealand

Trite planiceps, commonly known as the black-headed jumping spider, is a common jumping spider (Salticidae) endemic to New Zealand and one of about 150 species of jumping spiders in New Zealand.

== Taxonomy ==
Trite planiceps was first described in 1873 as Salticus minax from specimens collected from Riccarton Bush, Governor Bay and the North Island. Trite planiceps was later described again in 1899 as its current name by Eugene Simon. In 2011, T. planiceps was redescribed after DNA sequences were used to provide molecular evidence for the taxonomy of this species.

The holotypes were stored at the Muséum national d'histoire naturelle but are thought to have been lost.

== Description ==
Males and females range in body length from 6 to 13.5 mm. The cephalothorax (front half of the body, including the head) and first pair of legs are jet black. The elongated abdomen is golden brown, with a central yellow stripe, and sometimes has a greenish sheen. In males, the first pair of legs is elongated, there is a row of dark hairs above the frontal eyes, and the chelicerae (mouthparts) are more robust.

== Distribution and habitat ==
Trite planiceps is endemic to New Zealand. It is widespread in the North Island, South Island and Stewart Island. It frequently inhabits flax (Phormium) and cabbage trees (Cordyline). This species is also commonly seen around homes.

== Behaviour ==
=== Hunting ===
Like other jumping spiders, T. planiceps relies on their very acute eyesight for hunting. The anterior median eyes are the primary eyes used for capture of stationary prey while the anterior lateral eyes are the main eyes used in chasing. Both sets of eyes can be coordinated to enable switching from one hunting type to the other. It is mainly active during the day. Trite planiceps has also been shown to seize prey in the dark, probably by means of vibratory signals. Unlike typical jumping spiders, they do not make nightly web shelters. As T. planiceps lives in low altitudes, this could be an adaptation to cool overcast winters, where they need to survive within the dim recesses of rolled-up leaves of New Zealand flax (Phormium tenax) and similar plants. These leaves are typically one to two metres long and 5 to 10 cm wide.

=== Courtship ===
Males can use draglines left by females to locate them when they are concealed inside leaf shelters. They also change from vision-based courtship in the open to vibratory courtship when mating inside a rolled-up leaf. If an immature female is within about ten days of maturing, the male will live with her for this time and then mate inside the leaf. The two are in physical contact for a while after mating, and communicate using tactile signals. Upon entering a rolled-up leaf, both sexes will tap the leaf surface with the first pair of legs and vibrate their abdomen.

=== Nest building ===
Juveniles and subadults build flat, tubular silk cocoons with a door at each end inside rolled up leaves. Adult females build a silk platform 50% longer and two to three times wider than their own size before laying up to seven egg batches with 8 to 40 eggs each. Each batch is enclosed in its own silk casing. Males normally do not build nests.

=== Other behaviour ===
A wide array of behavioural patterns has been observed, including ritualized male duels. Trite planiceps shows increased alertness when given caffeine and will assess windspeed along with visual cues when preparing to jump.

== Interactions with humans ==
Due to their docile nature, bites from Trite planiceps are very rare (members of the public frequently handle them without getting bitten). Bites from T. planiceps only occur when the spider is acting defensively as a last resort. One case study of a T. planiceps bite reported that an individual was bitten when he rolled over while in bed and was unaware of a single T. planiceps in his shirt. The bite caused a stinging like sensation in his lower shoulder blades and left two puncture marks 1 mm apart. After four hours, the skin surrounding the puncture mark had formed a red halo. The swelling and tenderness settled shortly after and the redness faded after 72 hours.

== Conservation status ==
Under the New Zealand Threat Classification System, this species is listed as "Not Threatened".

== Gallery ==
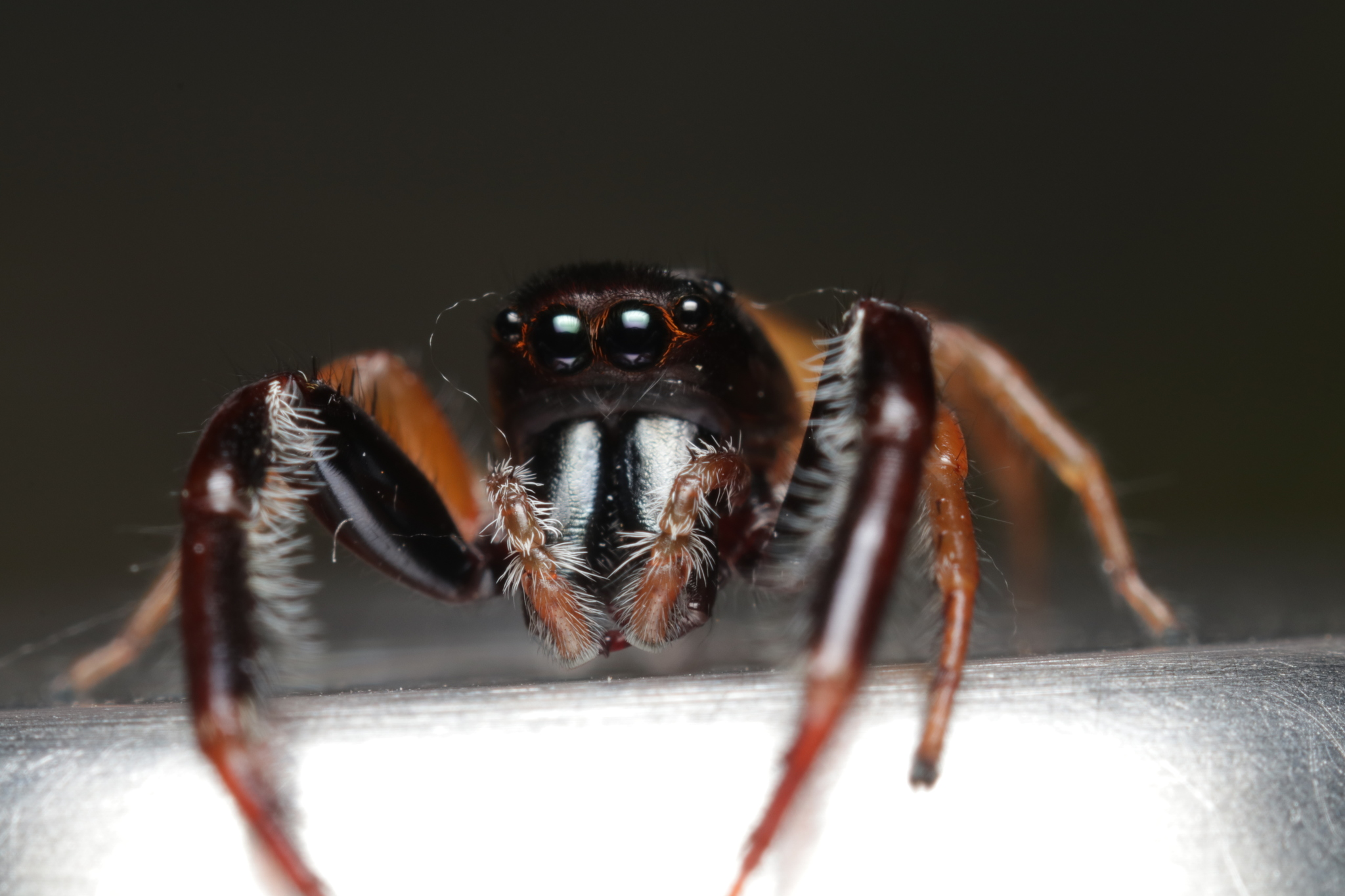

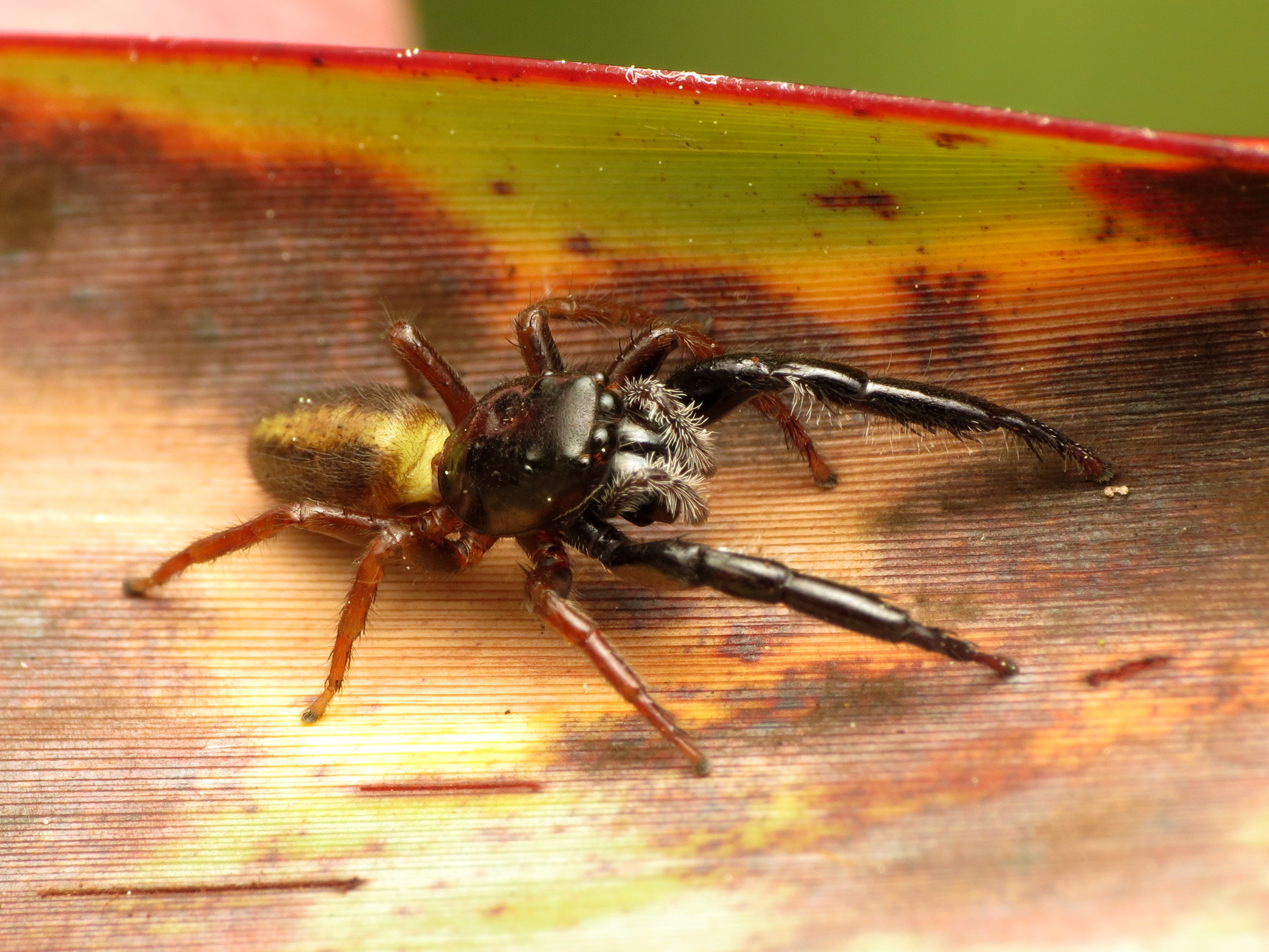

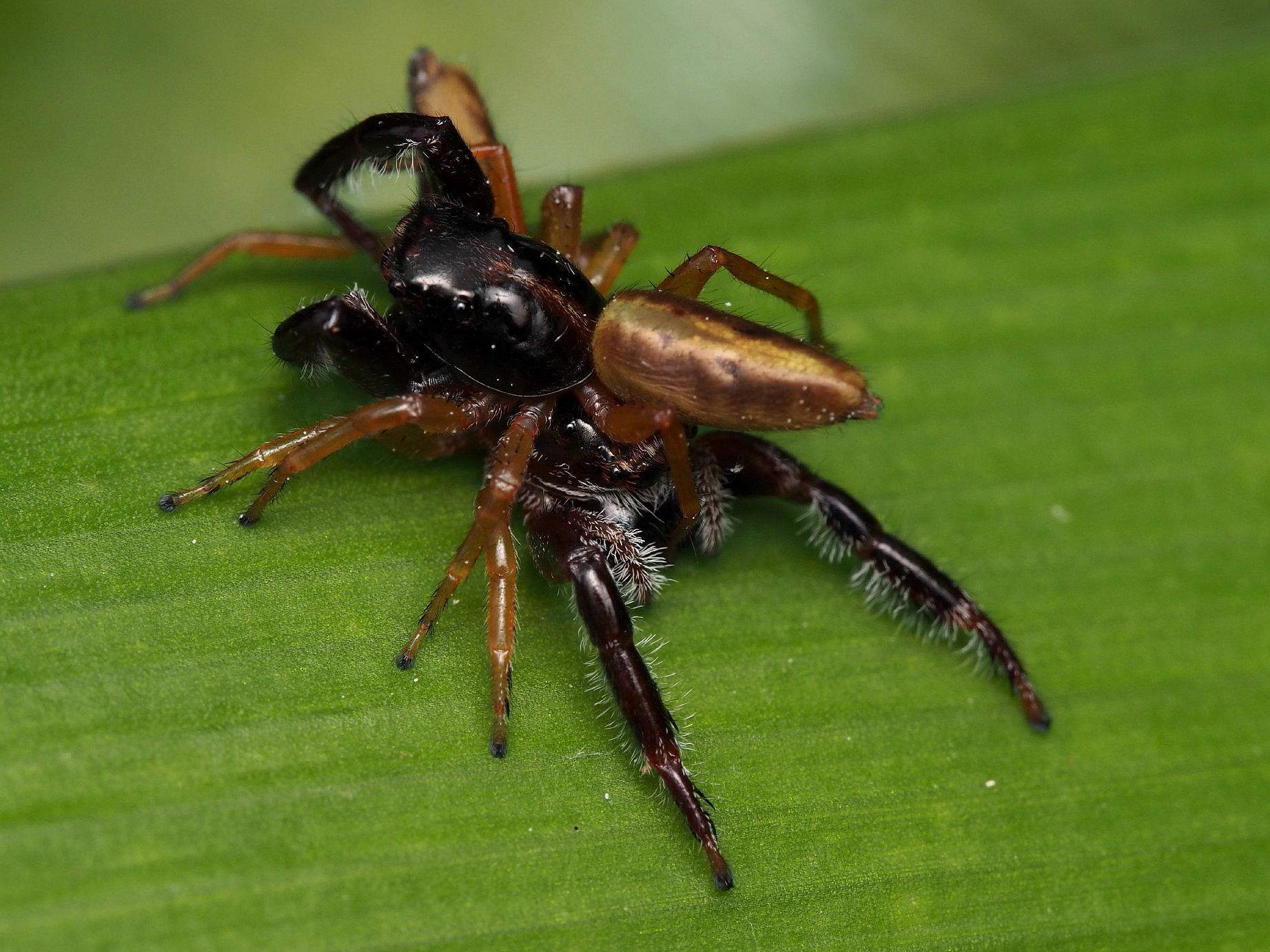

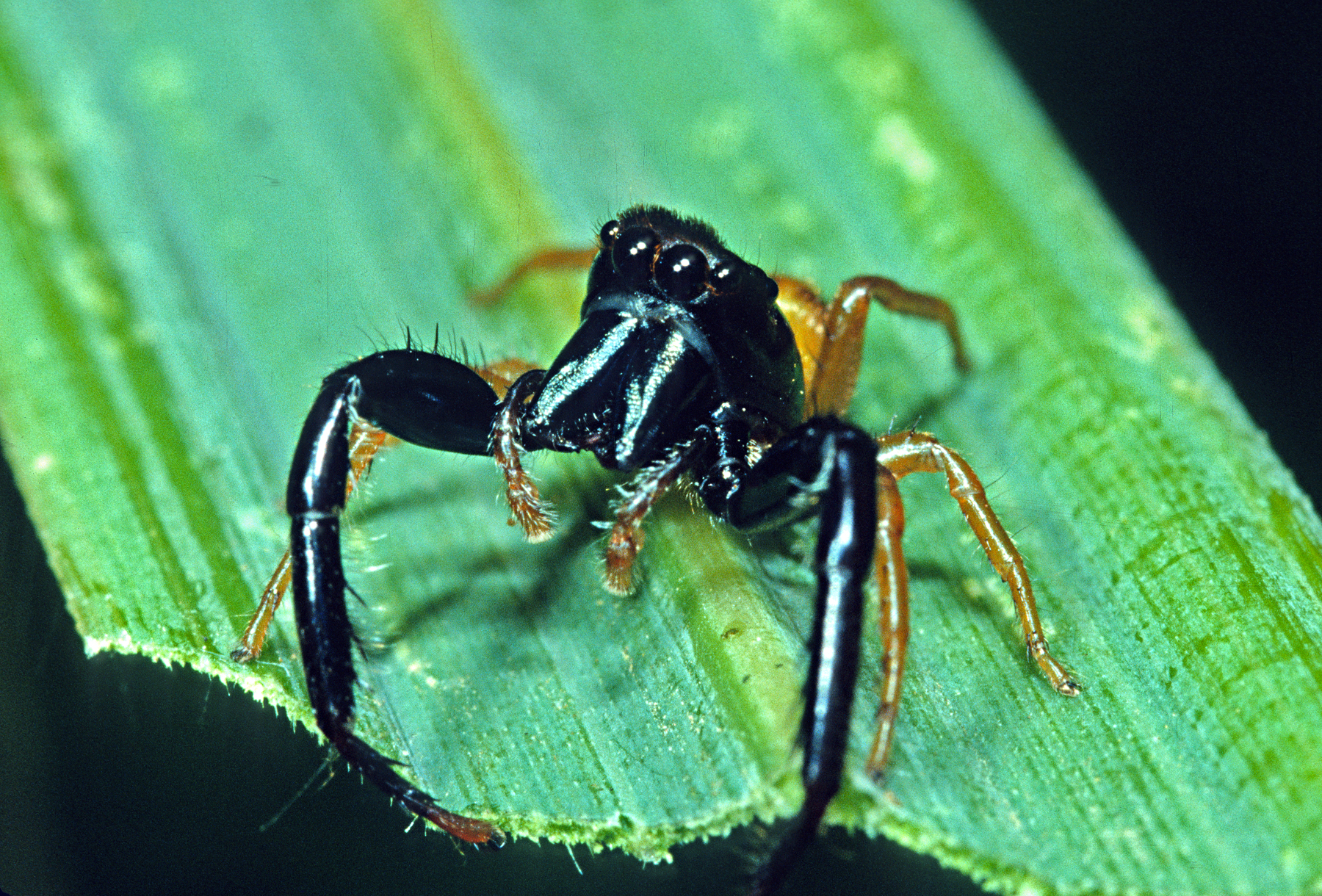
