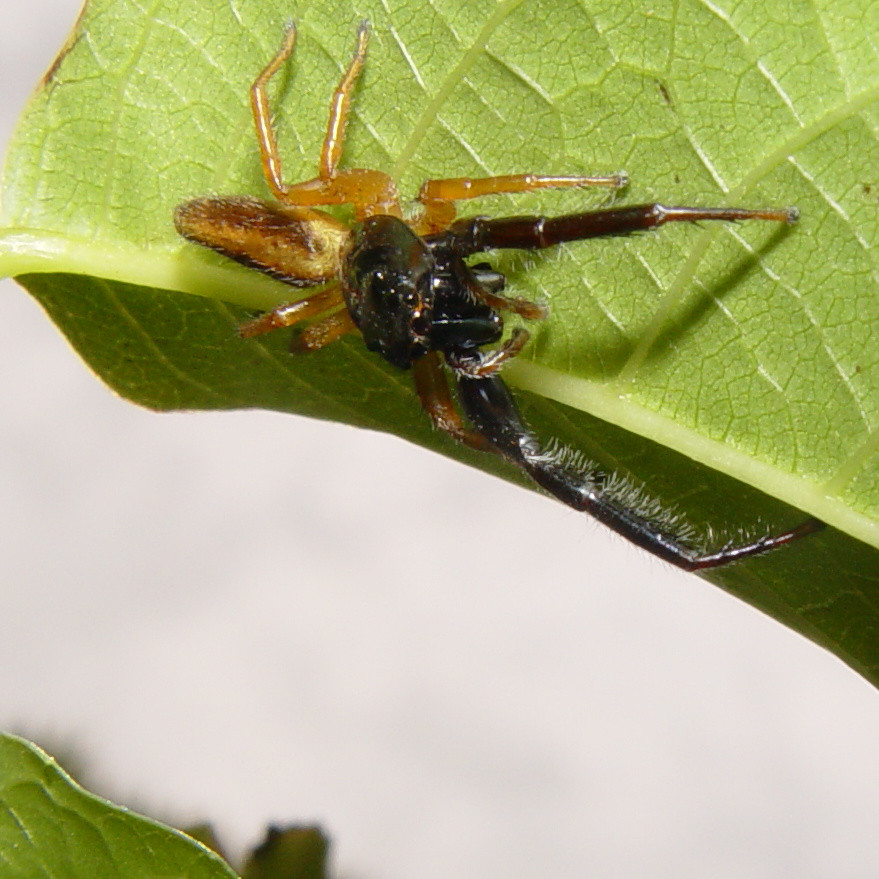
- T. planiceps

Scientific classification
- Kingdom: Animalia
- Phylum: Arthropoda
- Subphylum: Chelicerata
- Class: Arachnida
- Order: Araneae
- Infraorder: Araneomorphae
- Family: Salticidae
- Subfamily: Salticinae
- Genus: Trite; Simon, 1885

Type species
- Trite pennata Simon, 1885

Species
- see text

Diversity
- 21 species

= Trite =

Genus of spiders

Trite is a genus of jumping spiders first described by Eugène Simon in 1885. Most of the 18 described species occur in Australia and New Zealand, with several spread over islands of Oceania, one species even reaching Rapa in French Polynesia.

== Species ==
According to the World Spider Catalog in October 2018, there were twenty one recognised species:

- Trite albopilosa (Keyserling, 1883) – New South Wales, Victoria
- Trite auricoma (Urquhart, 1886) – New Zealand
- Trite caledoniensis Patoleta, 2014 – New Caledonia
- Trite concinna Rainbow, 1920 – Lord Howe Island, Norfolk Island
- Trite gracilipalpis Berland, 1929 – Loyalty Islands
- Trite grayi Richardson, 2016 – Lord Howe Islands
- Trite guilberti Patoleta, 2014 – New Caledonia
- Trite herbigrada (Urquhart, 1889) – New Zealand
- Trite ignipilosa Berland, 1924 – New Caledonia
- Trite lineata Simon, 1885 – New Caledonia
- Trite longipalpis Marples, 1955 – Samoa, Tonga
- Trite mustilina (Powell, 1873) – New Zealand
- Trite ornata Rainbow, 1915 – South Australia
- Trite parvula (Bryant, 1935) – New Zealand
- Trite pennata Simon, 1885 – New Caledonia
- Trite planiceps Simon, 1899 – New Zealand
- Trite pollardi Patoleta & Żabka, 2017 – New Zealand
- Trite ponapensis Berry, Beatty & Prószyński, 1997 – Caroline Islands
- Trite rapaensis Berland, 1942 – Rapa
- Trite simoni Patoleta, 2014 – New Caledonia, Loyalty Islands
- Trite urvillei (Dalmas, 1917) – New Zealand
