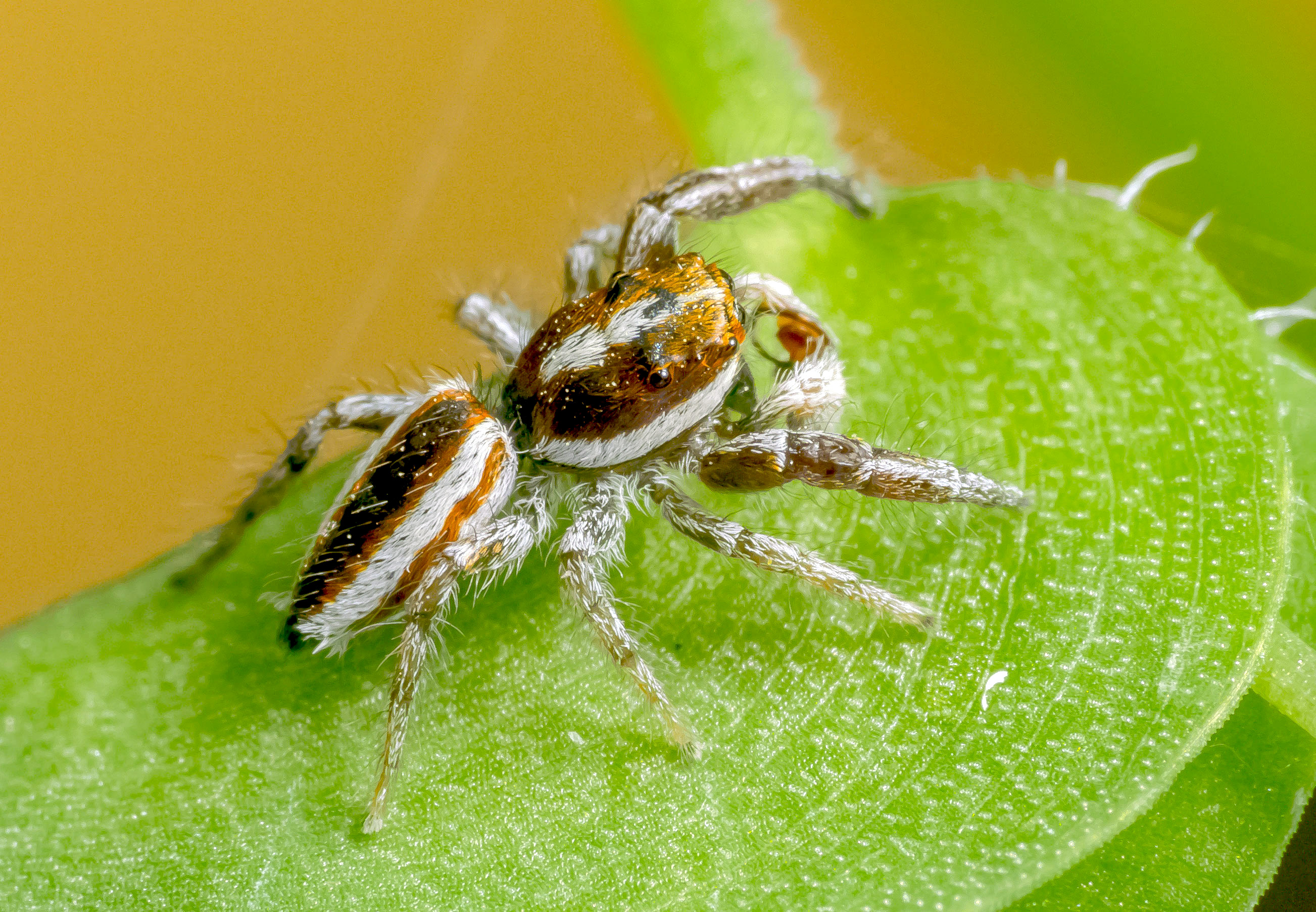
- A spider of the genus Afraflacilla

Scientific classification
- Kingdom: Animalia
- Phylum: Arthropoda
- Subphylum: Chelicerata
- Class: Arachnida
- Order: Araneae
- Infraorder: Araneomorphae
- Family: Salticidae
- Genus: Afraflacilla
- Species: A. eximia

Binomial name
- Afraflacilla eximia (Wesołowska & Russell-Smith, 2000)

Synonyms
- Pseudicius eximius Wesołowska & Russell-Smith, 2000

= Afraflacilla eximia =

Species of spider

Afraflacilla eximia is a species of jumping spider in the genus Afraflacilla that lives in Zimbabwe. The spider was first described in 2000 by Wanda Wesołowska and Anthony Russell-Smith. Originally allocated to the genus Pseudicius, it was moved to its current name by Jerzy Prószyński in 2016. It has a specific name that is derived from the Latin word that means "unusual". The spider is small, with a brown carapace that is typically 2.1 mm (0.08 in) long and a russet-brown abdomen that is typically 2.8 mm (0.11 in) long. It has a black eye field and brown legs. It has distinctive copulatory organs that enables it to be distinguished from other species in the genus, particularly the related Afraflacilla braunsi and Afraflacilla roberti. The male has a particularly long tibial apophysis, or projection on its palpal tibia, and longer embolus. The female has not been described.

== Taxonomy ==
Afraflacilla eximia is a species of jumping spider, a member of the family Salticidae, that was first described by Wanda Wesołowska and Anthony Russell-Smith in 2000. It is one of over 500 species identified by Wesołowska during her career, leading her to be one of the most prolific scientists in the field. They originally allocated the species to the genus Pseudicius with the name Pseudicius eximiaus. First circumscribed by Eugène Simon in 1885, the genus Pseudicius is named after two Greek words that can be translated false and honest. The spider's specific name is derived from a Latin word that can be translated "unusual".

The genus Afraflacilla is a member of the tribe Heliophaninae, which has been found across most continents of the world. Wayne Maddison renamed the tribe Chrysillini in 2015. The tribe is a member of the clade Saltafresia within the subfamily Salticoida. A year later, in 2016, Jerzy Prószyński moved the species to the genus Afraflacilla on the basis of the shape of the spider's copulatory organs. It was one of more than 40 species that were transferred between the two genera at the time. Afraflacilla had been circumscribed by Lucien Betland and Jacques Millot in 1941. It is also a member of the tribe Chrysillini. Prószyński allocated the genus to the Pseudiciines group of genera in 2017, which was named after the genus Pseudicius. They can be distinguished from other jumping spiders by their flattened and elongated body and characteristic colour patterns.

== Description ==
Afraflacilla eximia is a small spider. The male has a rather flat brown carapace that is typically 2.1 mm (0.08 in) long and 1.5 mm (0.06 in) wide. It is covered in shiny grey hairs with a scattering of brown bristles. Its underside, or sternum, is brown. The spider's eye field is black with small fawn scales near the foremost eyes. The spider's face, or clypeus, has low and brown. The spider has distinctive mouthparts, with brown chelicerae, labium and maxillae. The chelicerae have two teeth towards the front and one to the rear. The maxillae is triangular and has light tips. The oval abdomen is typically 2.8 mm (0.11 in) long and 1.5 mm (0.06 in) wide. It is russet-brown with a pattern four small round white spots in pairs along its edges. There is a region that is black to the rear and a lighter more indistinct streak to the very front. It has a covering of dense hairs and a scattering of brown bristles similar to the carapace. The underside is light brown. The spinnerets and the legs are brown with brown hairs and brown spines. The first pair of legs are larger than the others. The pedipalps are brown. The spider has stridulatory apparatus for making sounds from rubbing its front legs against short thick bristles on the edges of the carapace under the spider's eyes.

The spider has distinctive copulatory organs. The male has a particularly long projection on the palpal tibia, or tibial apophysis that is thicker at its root and has a darker tip. The palpal bulb has a characteristic shape with a noticeable bulge towards the bottom. The embolus is long and thin, stretching from the base of the palpal bulb, around it and extending beyond its top. The copulatory organs are particularly important in helping the species to differentiate it from others in the genus, many of which were also previously allocated to the genus Pseudicius. For example, the spider is similar to the related Afraflacilla braunsi but differs in the shape of the palpal bulb. It is distinguished from Afraflacilla roberti by its longer palpal bulb and embolus, and the way that the two connect. The female has not been described.

== Behaviour ==
Jumping spiders rarely use webs and instead use their good eyesight to hunt prey. The related Afraflacilla refulgens creates nests of silk for summer and winter, the latter thicker with a sticky silk that fully covers the spider. They live together is loose conglomerations, with many living on the same tree. The spiders hide in the bark of trees. Afraflacilla eximia is particularly found living in Vachellia drepanolobium trees, which is also inhabited by ants of the genus Crematogaster. The ants are extremely aggressive. Most spiders live in areas of the trees that have been vacated by the ants. The spiders use visual displays during courtship and transmits vibratory signals through silk to communicate to other spiders.

== Distribution ==
Afraflacilla eximia is endemic to Tanzania. It has been found across the Mkomazi National Park. The male holotype was found near in Tanga Region in 1997.
