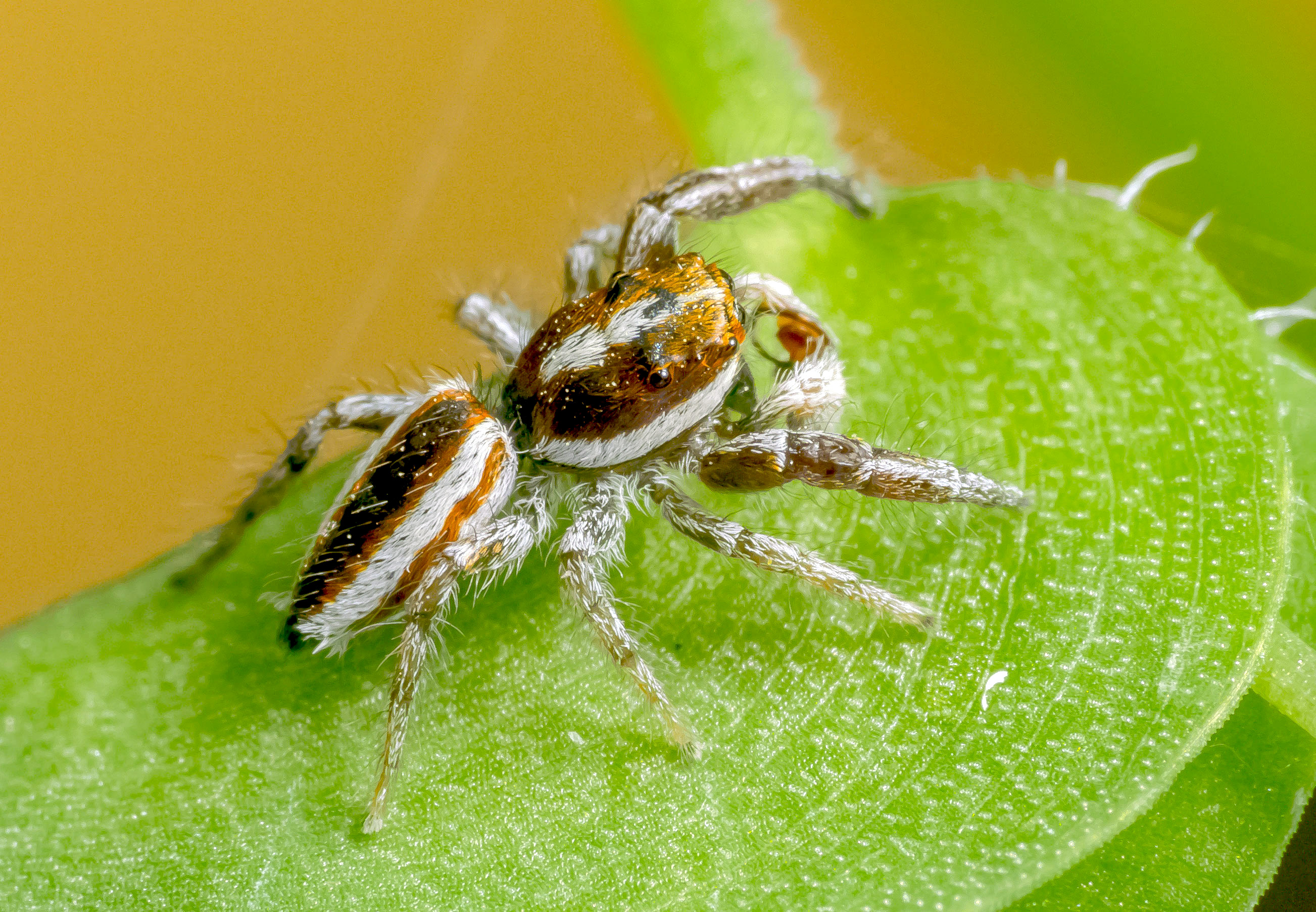
- A related spider of the genus Afraflacilla

Scientific classification
- Kingdom: Animalia
- Phylum: Arthropoda
- Subphylum: Chelicerata
- Class: Arachnida
- Order: Araneae
- Infraorder: Araneomorphae
- Family: Salticidae
- Genus: Afraflacilla
- Species: A. refulgens

Binomial name
- Afraflacilla refulgens (Wesołowska & Cumming, 2008)

Synonyms
- Pseudicius refulgens Wesołowska & Cumming, 2008

= Afraflacilla refulgens =

Species of spider

Afraflacilla refulgens is a species of jumping spider in the genus Afraflacilla that lives in Zimbabwe. It lives in loose conglomerations in nests of white papery silk and is particularly visible in September and October. The males will display to each other, but will retreat if they feel threatened. A small spider, it has a dark carapace that is between 1.7 and 2.2 mm (0.067 and 0.087 in) long and an abdomen between 1.9 and 3.0 mm (0.075 and 0.118 in) long. It has a very dark, nearly black, eye field, although the male has a very thin white line behind the first row of eyes. The legs are generally yellow, apart from the front pair on the male, which are brown, longer and stouter and used for stridulation. The male abdomen is black with a pattern of white spots. The female abdomen is very dark brown, nearly black at the front and yellow to the rear. Both have a distinctive iridescent patch at the back of the abdomen that is recalled in the name of the species, which is a Latin word that can be translated "brilliant". It is this iridescent patch that helps to distinguish the species, although a study of the copulatory organs is needed to confirm its identity. The spider was first described in 2008 by Wanda Wesołowska and Meg Cumming. Originally allocated to the genus Pseudicius, it was moved to its current name by Jerzy Prószyński in 2016.

== Taxonomy ==
Afraflacilla refulgens is a jumping spider that was first described by Wanda Wesołowska and Meg Cumming in 2008. It is one of over 500 species identified by Wesołowska during her career. They originally allocated the species to the genus Pseudicius with the name Pseudicius refulgens. The species name is a Latin word that can be translated "brilliant". It is named for the distinctive iridescent patch that can be seen towards the back of the spider's abdomen. First circumscribed by Eugène Simon in 1885, the genus Pseudicius is named after two Greek words that can be translated false and honest. The genus was a member of the tribe Heliophaninae, which is ubiquitous across most continents of the world. Wayne Maddison renamed the tribe Chrysillini in 2015. The tribe is a member of the clade Saltafresia within the subfamily Salticoida.

In 2016, Jerzy Prószyński moved the species to the genus Afraflacilla on the basis of the shape of the spider's copulatory organs. It was one of more than 40 species that were transferred between the two genera at the time. Afraflacilla had been circumscribed by Lucien Betland and Jacques Millot in 1941. It is also a member of the tribe Chrysillini. Prószyński allocated the genus to the Pseudiciines group of genera in 2017, which was named after the genus Pseudicius. Members of the group of genera can be distinguished from other jumping spiders by their stridulatory spines and their copulatory organs.

== Description ==
Afraflacilla refulgens is a small spider. The female has a dark brown carapace, the topside of the forepart of its body, that is between 2.0 and 2.2 mm (0.079 and 0.087 in) long and 1.4 and 1.5 mm (0.055 and 0.059 in) wide that has a covering of greyish hairs. It is paler on its sides and dark brown on its underside, or sternum. There are long brown bristles on the eye field with small grey and golden scales near the foremost eyes. The spider's face, or clypeus, has light hairs. The spider has dark brown chelicerae, labium and maxilae, or mouthparts. The female's abdomen is between 2.4 and 3.0 mm (0.094 and 0.118 in) long and 1.5 and 1.9 mm (0.059 and 0.075 in) wide. It is very dark brown, nearly black, on its front of the topside and yellowish to the rear with a pattern of four small round white patches in pairs. There is an iridescent patch of bristles to the rear. It is covered in dark hairs. The underside is yellowish with dark streak down the middle. The spinnerets are dark and the legs are yellow to brownish with brown hairs. It has distinctive copulatory organs, which include an oval epigyne, the external visible part of its copulatory organs, that is slightly elevated and sclerotized to the rear. The copulatory openings lead to short insemination ducts and relatively large spermathecae, or receptacles. There are also large accessory glands and gonopores that are located close to each other.

The male is very similar to the female. The carapace is similar in size, a very flat oval measuring between 1.7 and 2.2 mm (0.067 and 0.087 in) long and 1.3 and 1.5 mm (0.051 and 0.059 in) wide. It is dark brown, covered in delicate colourless hairs. The eye field is very dark, nearly black, with a very thin white line behind the first row of eyes and a few long bristles near the foremost eyes. The sternum is light brown, as are the mouthparts. It has an abdomen that is smaller than the female, between 1.9 and 2.8 mm (0.075 and 0.110 in) long and 1.1 and 1.5 mm (0.043 and 0.059 in) wide. It is a brown elongated oval marked with a few small white patches in pairs and a similarly iridescent area towards the rear as the female. The underside is yellow with a hint of grey. The front legs are brown and stout with a swollen tibia. The remaining legs are yellow. The pedipalps are brown.The palpal femur is slightly swollen and the tibia is short with a wide protrusion, or apophyses. The palpal bulb has a large lobe at its read and a small extension in centre. It has a medium-sized embolus that has a wider base and a thinner tip. As with other members of the genus, the spider has stridulatory apparatus. The spider rubs its front legs against a row of fine hairs on the side of the carapace.

The species has characteristics that enables it to be distinguished from others in the genus, many of which were also previously allocated to the genus Pseudicius. The iridescent patch on the rear of the abdomen is its most distinctive feature but a study of the design of the copulatory organs enables the identity of the species to be confirmed. For example, the male being distinguished from Afraflacilla elegans by its wider and shorter tibial apophyses and the shape of its embolus, particularly the broad base. The female can be identified by the elevated section towards the back of its epigyne.

== Behaviour ==
Jumping spiders rarely use webs and instead use their good eyesight to hunt prey. Afraflacilla refulgens feed on caterpillars of the geometer moth family. The spiders create nests of white papery silk that have an exterior dotted with debris. They will create summer and winter retreats, the latter thicker with a sticky silk that fully covers the spider. They are most numerous in the dry season, especially in September and October. The young are generally born between November and March. The spiders live together is loose conglomerations, with many living on the same tree. The spiders lower themselves from upper branches on long threads of silk. There is marked male to male display, but they are generally tolerant of each other. Although often they can be aggressive, they will generally shuffle backwards if they feel threatened. The spiders use visual displays during courtship and transmit vibratory signals through silk to communicate to other spiders.

== Distribution and habitat ==
Afraflacilla refulgens is endemic to Zimbabwe. It has been particularly studied in suburban Harare. The male holotype was found 2005 living in Acacia trees. Many other examples were also observed locally. It lives particularly on tree trunks, using the small gaps formed when pieces of bark detach as hiding places and as locations for its nests.
