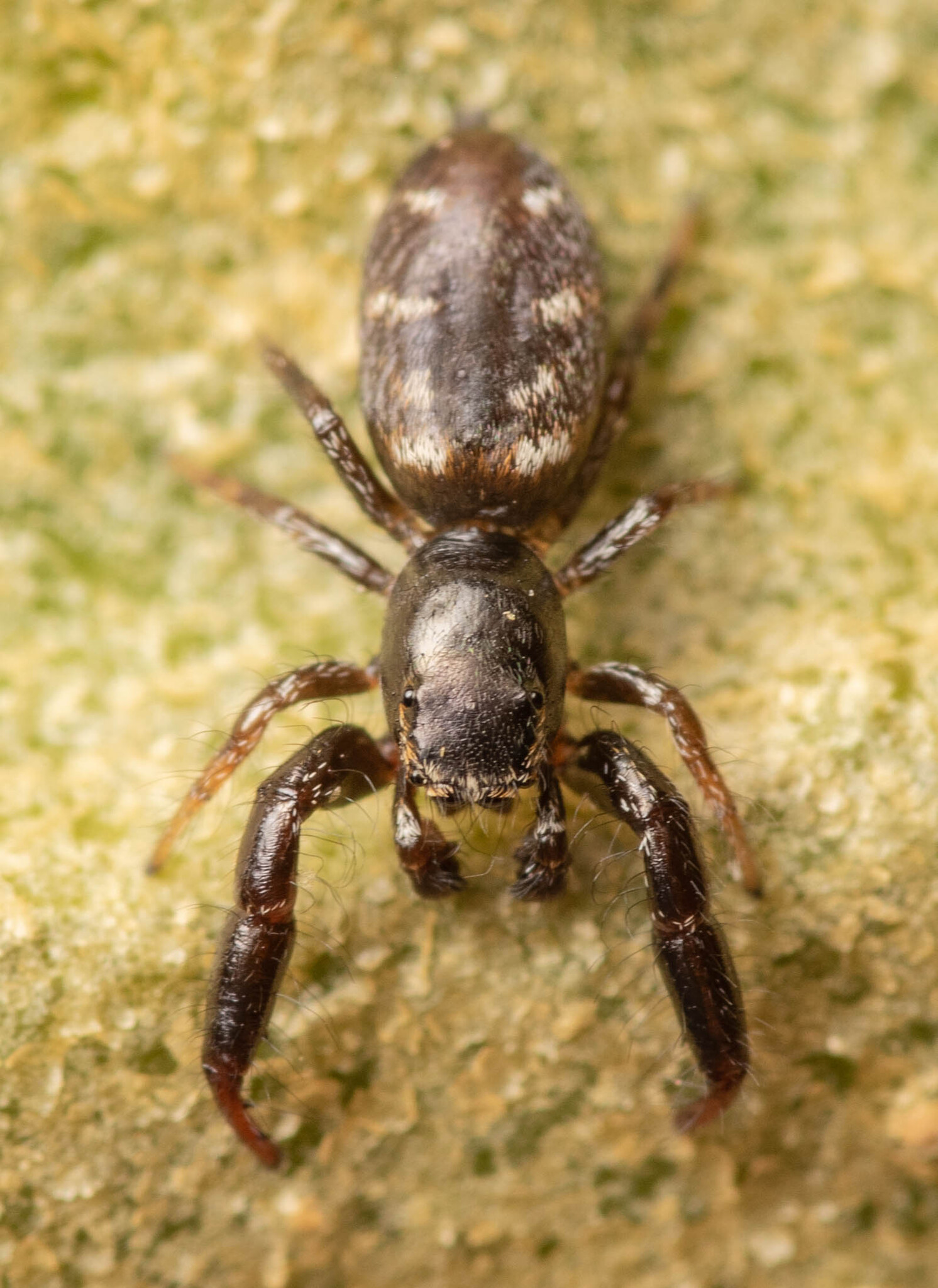

Conservation status
- Least Concern (IUCN 3.1)

Scientific classification
- Kingdom: Animalia
- Phylum: Arthropoda
- Subphylum: Chelicerata
- Class: Arachnida
- Order: Araneae
- Infraorder: Araneomorphae
- Family: Salticidae
- Genus: Afraflacilla
- Species: A. venustula

Binomial name
- Afraflacilla venustula (Wesołowska & Haddad, 2009)

Synonyms
- Pseudicius venustulus Wesołowska & Haddad, 2009

= Afraflacilla venustula =

Ndumo Afraflacilla jumping spider

Species of spider

Afraflacilla venustula, the Ndumo Afraflacilla jumping spider, is a species of jumping spider in the genus Afraflacilla that lives in South Africa. The spider was first described in 2009 by Wanda Wesołowska and Charles Haddad. Originally allocated to the genus Pseudicius, it was moved to its current name by Jerzy Prószyński in 2016. The spider is small, with a forward section that is between 1.7 and 2.0 mm (0.067 and 0.079 in) long and, behind that, an abdomen between 1.8 and 2.5 mm (0.071 and 0.098 in) long. The male is larger than the female. Its carapace, the upper part of its forward section, is light brown, although some males are darker, with a black eye field. The male abdomen is black with a pattern of four pairs of white spots, like Pseudicius sengwaensis. The female's abdomen is yellowish with four brown spots. Its legs are generally yellow, apart from the front pair on the male, which are brown, longer and stouter. Its copulatory organs help identify it. The male has a distinctive bulbous shape to its palpal bulb and a longer embolus than related species.

== Taxonomy and etymology ==
Afraflacilla venustula is a species of jumping spider, a member of the family Salticidae, that was first described by the arachnologists Wanda Wesołowska and Charles R. Haddad in 2009. It is one of over 500 species identified by Wesołowska during her career, second only to the French naturalist Eugène Simon in the number of spider species described. They originally allocated the species to the genus Pseudicius with the name Pseudicius venustulus. First circumscribed by Simon in 1885, the genus is named after two Greek words that can be translated false and honest. The genus is a member of the tribe Heliophaninae, which is ubiquitous across most continents of the world. Wayne Maddison renamed the tribe Chrysillini in 2015. The tribe is a member of the clade Saltafresia within the subfamily Salticoida.

A year later, in 2016, Jerzy Prószyński moved the species to the genus Afraflacilla on the basis of the shape of the copulatory organs. It was one of more than 40 species that were transferred between the two genera at the time. Afraflacilla had been circumscribed by Lucien Betland and Jacques Millot in 1941. It is also a member of the tribe Chrysillini. Prószyński allocated the genus to the Pseudiciines group of genera in 2017, which was named after the genus Pseudicius.

A. venustula can be distinguished from other jumping spiders by its flattened and elongated body and characteristic colour patterns. The species is named after a Latin word that can be translated 'pretty'. It is also known as the Ndumo Afraflacilla Jumping Spider.

== Description ==
Afraflacilla venustula is a small spider with an elongated shape. Its body consists of two main sections. The female has a carapace, the upper part of the forward section, that is between 1.7 and 1.8 mm (0.067 and 0.071 in) long and 1.1 and 1.2 mm (0.043 and 0.047 in) wide. Flattened, it is light brown with a covering of thin colourless hairs. The spider's eye field is black with a few brown bristles and white scales around the eyes themselves. The spider has yellow to brown mouthparts, including its chelicerae, labium and maxilae The underside of the carapace, or sternum, is also yellow to brown.

Behind its carapace, the female has an abdomen that is between 1.8 and 2.0 mm (0.071 and 0.079 in) long and 1.1 and 1.3 mm (0.043 and 0.051 in) wide. It is elongated and has a yellowish topside covered with brown and whitish hairs and a pattern of four brown spots. Its spinnerets are dark and the legs are yellow. It has an oval epigyne, the visible external part of its copulatory organs, that has two rounded depressions to the front and two pouches to the rear. The copulatory openings lead to wide complex insemination ducts and relatively small spermathecae.

The male is very similar to the female, but has a similar pattern on its abdomen to Pseudicius sengwaensis. Its carapace is similar in size measuring between 1.7 and 2.0 mm (0.067 and 0.079 in) long and 1.2 and 1.3 mm (0.047 and 0.051 in) wide while its abdomen is larger, between 2.0 and 2.5 mm (0.079 and 0.098 in) long and 1.1 and 1.4 mm (0.043 and 0.055 in) wide. Its carapace is generally a darker brown than the female but is otherwise similar. Some examples have a lighter carapace like the female. Its mouthparts are similar to the female's. Its abdomen has a pattern of four pairs of white spots on a black background. The first pair of its legs is brown and stouter than the others with a swollen tibia. Its remaining legs are yellow like the female's.

The male's copulatory organs are distinctive. Its pedipalps, sensory organs near its mouth, are yellow or brown. Its pedipalps finish with a short tibia that has three apophyses, or appendages, and a distinctive palpal bulb that has noticeable bulbous appendages in the middle and a long thin embolus that projects from its end.

The species is superficially similar to others in the genus, many of which were also previously allocated to the genus Pseudicius. For example, both the female and male are hard to distinguish from the closely related Afraflacilla altera and Afraflacilla elegans and the male has similar morphological characteristics to Afraflacilla karinae. The species can only be clearly identified by studying the structure of its copulatory organs. For example, the male can be distinguished from Afraflacilla altera by the presence of three, rather than two, tibial apophyses, and the female by the position of the pouches on its epigyne, which are near the central furrow rather than the gonopores. The male differs from Afraflacilla imitator in the shape of the palpal bulb and its longer embolus while the female has longer insemination ducts and shorter accessory glands.

== Behaviour ==
Jumping spiders rarely use webs and instead use their good eyesight to hunt prey. Afraflacilla venustula spiders are particularly active in the early and mid-morning, and mid-afternoon. They create silk cocoons. Males were often observed sharing cocoons with subadult females. Females were known to stay with the egg sacs until the babies emerged from their eggs. The spiders use visual displays during courtship and transmit vibratory signals through silk to communicate to other spiders. Afraflacilla spiders eat insects, including eggs, larvae and nymphs, and so can be useful in controlling pests in macadamia orchards.

== Distribution and habitat ==
Afraflacilla venustula lives in South Africa. The holotype was found in Ndumo Game Reserve in 2005. Other examples were also found throughout the reserve. It lives on the bark of Vachellia xanthophloea trees.
