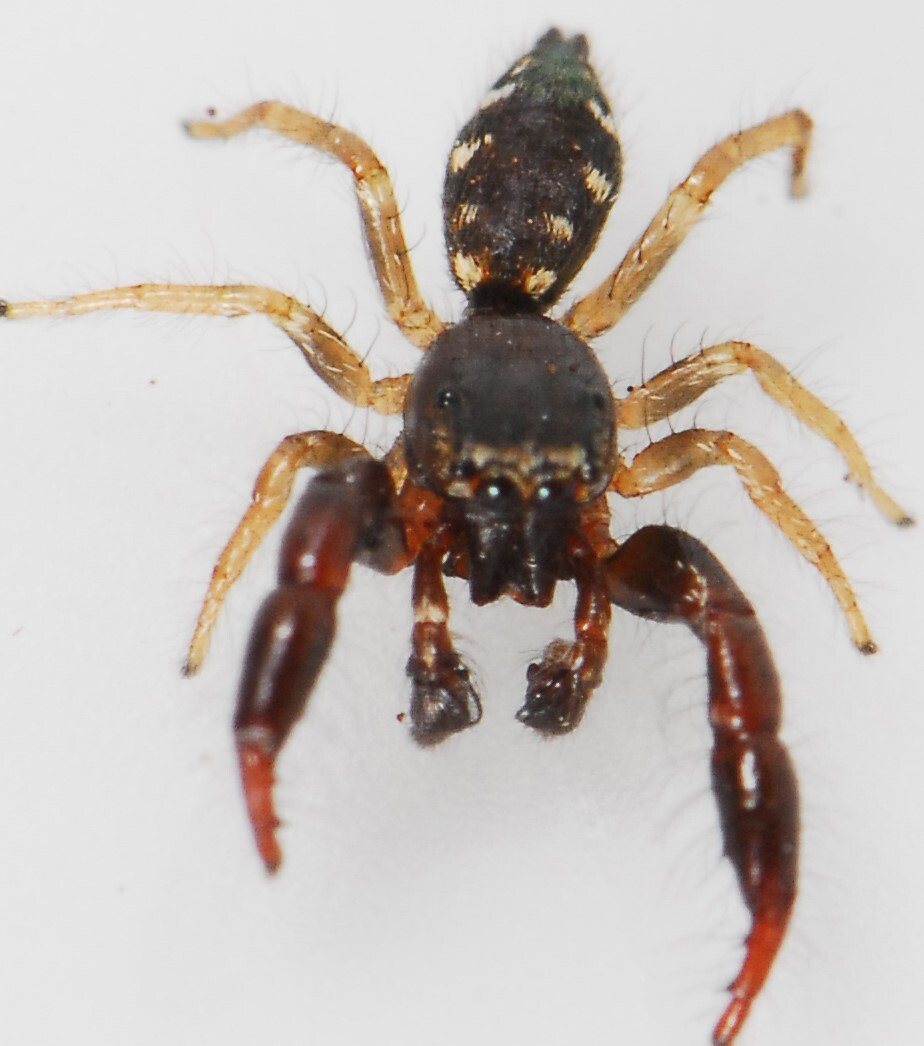
- Male
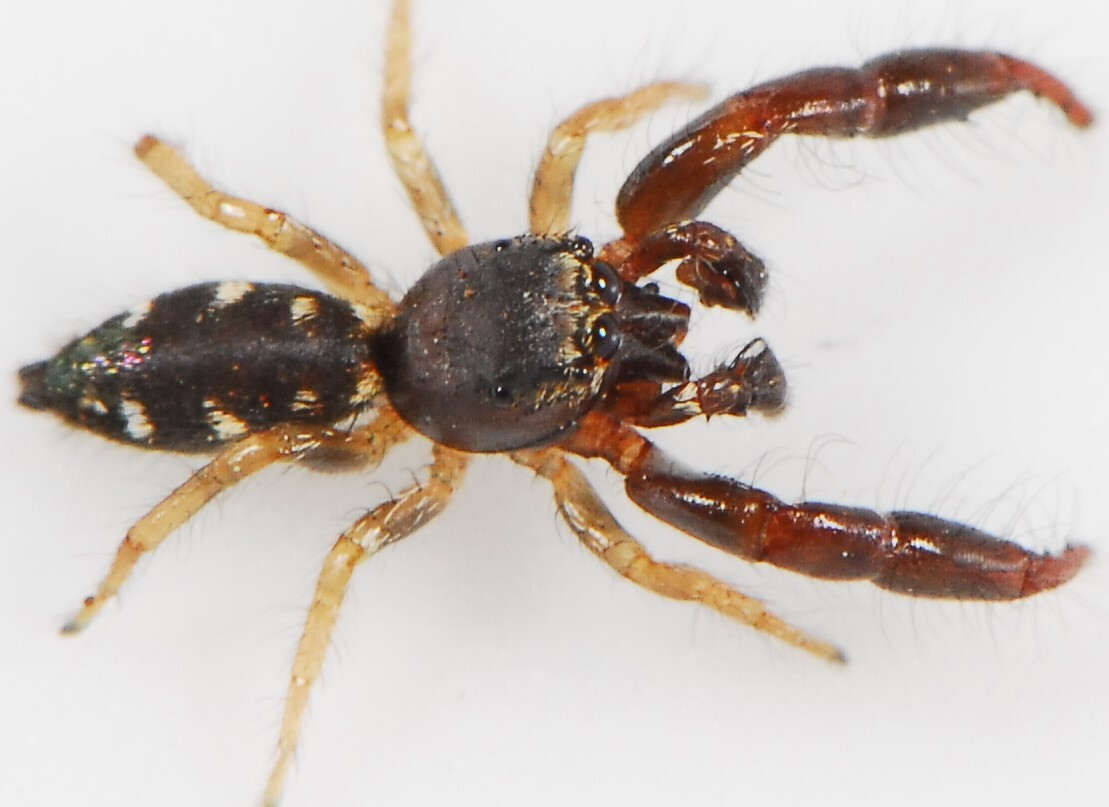
- Male

Scientific classification
- Kingdom: Animalia
- Phylum: Arthropoda
- Subphylum: Chelicerata
- Class: Arachnida
- Order: Araneae
- Infraorder: Araneomorphae
- Family: Salticidae
- Genus: Afraflacilla
- Species: A. altera

Binomial name
- Afraflacilla altera (Wesołowska, 2000)

Synonyms
- Pseudicius alter Wesołowska, 2000

= Afraflacilla altera =

Species of spider

Afraflacilla altera is a species of jumping spider in the genus Afraflacilla, found in Southern Africa. The spider was first described in 2000 by Wanda Wesołowska and originally allocated to the genus Pseudicius.

The male and female are similar in size and shape, although the female is generally lighter. They have a similar pattern of three white dots on each side of the brown abdomen.

It is a relatively rare species, particularly compared to the more common Afraflacilla venustula.

== Distribution ==
Afraflacilla altera is found in Botswana, South Africa, and Zimbabwe. The holotype was found near the Shashe River in Zimbabwe in 1990 alongside other examples. The first example to be found in South Africa was collected on the shore of the Shokwe Pan in Ndumo Game Reserve in 2000.

In South Africa, the species has been recorded from KwaZulu-Natal and Limpopo provinces. Notable localities include Ithala Nature Reserve and Ndumo Game Reserve in KwaZulu-Natal, and Pafuri border camp in Kruger National Park in Limpopo.

== Life style ==
The spider thrives in trees like Ficus sycomorus.

In South Africa, it has been sampled from grassland as well as from Vachellia and Ficus trees in the Savanna Biome at altitudes ranging from 140 to 1025 m.

== Description ==
Afraflacilla altera is a small spider with a slender elongated shape. The female has a carapace that is typically 1.6 mm (0.063 in) long and 1.1 mm (0.043 in) wide. Elongated and flattened, it is dark brown with a covering of thin brownish-grey hairs. The eye field is black with a few long bristles around the eyes themselves. The spider has darker brown chelicerae and sternum and a lighter brown labium. The abdomen is typically 2.1 mm (0.083 in) long and 1.3 mm (0.051 in) wide. It is elongated and has a brown topside covered with short hairs and a pattern of six white spots, three on each side. The spinnerets are dark. The legs are brown and have a sparse covering of long, thin brown leg hairs. The front legs are much longer, stouter and darker compared to the others. It has a rounded epigyne that is heavily sclerotized. It has two pockets and two round copulatory openings that lead to coiled insemination ducts, long accessory glands and long spermathecae.

The male is very similar to the female. The carapace and abdomen are about the same size, measuring. typically 1.7 mm (0.067 in) long and 1.2 mm (0.047 in) wide and 2.6 mm (0.10 in) long and 1.4 mm (0.055 in) wide respectively. It looks superficially similar to the female, but with an almost indistinguishable pattern, but is a little darker. The pedipalps are pear-shaped. The spider has a short tibia with two apophyses, or appendages, the lower one shorter than the other. The spider has a bulbous palpal bulb with a large lump at the bottom and a long thin embolus.

The species is similar to others in the genus, many of which were also previously allocated to the genus Pseudicius. It is superficially almost indistinguishable from some other species in the genus, particularly Afraflacilla karinae and Afraflacilla venustula. It can be best differentiated by its copulatory organs, particularly the shape of the male tibial apophyses, or appendages, and the arrangement of pouches and openings on the female epigyne.

The male is particularly closely related to Afraflacilla karinae, from which it is hard to distinguish without a close look at its copulatory organs. The species is evidentially related to Afraflacilla venustula, the male being distinguished by the presence of two, rather than three, tibial apophyses, and the female by the way that the pouches on the epigyne are near the gonopores rather than the central furrow. The male is also similar to Afraflacilla arabica, differing in the more bulbous design of the tibial appendages. The male can be differentiated from Afraflacilla elegans by its two tibial apophyses. The female is very similar to Afraflacilla histrionica, differing in the location of the pockets in the epigyne.

== Etymology ==
The spider's specific name is a Latin word that can be translated as "another". Its generic name is related to two Greek words that can be translated false and honest.

== Taxonomy ==
Afraflacilla altera was first described by Wanda Wesołowska in 2000. It is one of over 500 species identified by Wesołowska during her career, one of the highest amongst scientists in the field.

She originally allocated the species to the genus Pseudicius, first circumscribed by Eugène Simon in 1885.

The genus is a member of the tribe Heliophaninae, which is ubiquitous across most continents of the world. Wayne Maddison renamed the tribe Chrysillini in 2015. The tribe is a member of the clade Saltafresia within the subfamily Salticoida.

A year later, in 2016, Jerzy Prószyński moved the species to the genus Afraflacilla on the basis of the shape of the copulatory organs. It was one of more than 40 species that were transferred between the two genera at the time. Afraflacilla had been circumscribed by Lucien Berland and Jacques Millot in 1941. It is also a member of the tribe Chrysillini. Prószyński allocated the genus to the Pseudiciines group of genera in 2017, which was named after the genus Pseudicius. They can be distinguished from other jumping spiders by their flattened and elongated body and characteristic colour patterns.

== Conservation ==
Due to its wide geographical range, the species is listed as Least Concern. It is protected in Ndumo Game Reserve, Ithala Nature Reserve, and Kruger National Park. There are no significant threats to the species.
