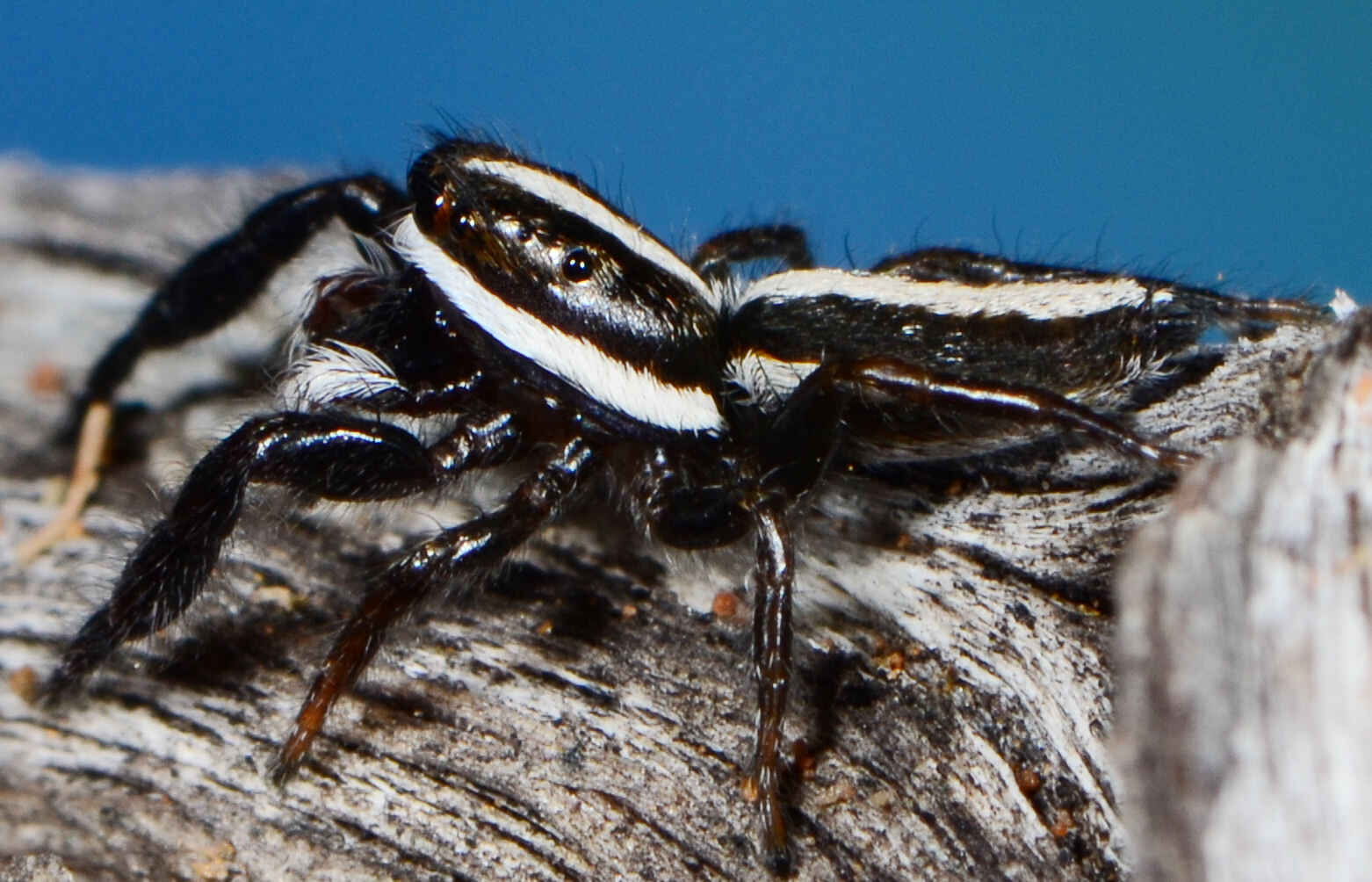
- female
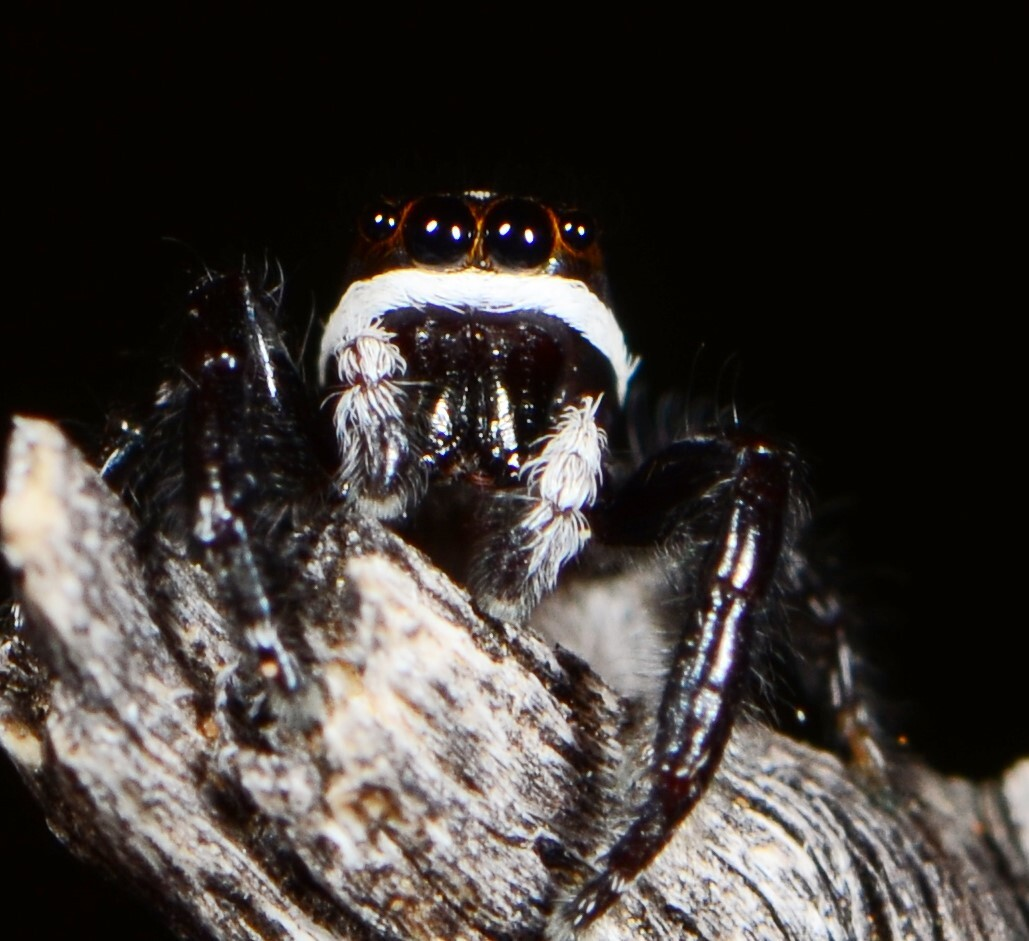
- female

Scientific classification
- Kingdom: Animalia
- Phylum: Arthropoda
- Subphylum: Chelicerata
- Class: Arachnida
- Order: Araneae
- Infraorder: Araneomorphae
- Family: Salticidae
- Genus: Afraflacilla
- Species: A. braunsi

Binomial name
- Afraflacilla braunsi (G. W. Peckham & E. G. Peckham, 1903)

Synonyms
- Pseudicius braunsii Peckham & Peckham, 1903; Icius braunsi Prószyński, 1987; Pseudicius tripunctatus Prószyński, 1989; Pseudicius braunsi Logunov, 1995; Afraflacilla tripunctata Prószyński, 2017

= Afraflacilla braunsi =

Species of spider

Afraflacilla braunsi is a species of jumping spider in the genus Afraflacilla. First found in South Africa, the spider was subsequently observed living in Saudi Arabia, Turkmenistan, the United Arab Emirates and Yemen, although it is likely to have a wider distribution. First described in 1903 by George and Elizabeth Peckham, it was originally allocated to the genus Pseudicius with the name Pseudicius braunsii. After being renamed Icius braunsi in 1987, it was finally given its current name by Jerzy Prószyński in 2017. Pseudicius tripunctatus, now called Afraflacilla tripunctata, is a synonym.

A small to medium-sized spider, Afraflacilla braunsi has a carapace that is between 1.7 and 1.9 mm (0.07 and 0.07 in) long and an abdomen 2.2 and 3.2 mm (0.09 and 0.13 in) long. The carapace is brown, sometimes with yellow sides. The abdomen is light brown or fawn with lighter yellow patches. It has large brown front legs, the remainder generally yellow and less robust. It makes noises by rubbing its forelegs against small hairs under its eyes. The copulatory organs are distinctive for the species. The male has a characteristically bulbous palpal bulb and a single long projection, or apophysis, extending from the palpal tibia. The female has very long and coiled insemination ducts that lead to large spermathecae.

== Taxonomy ==
Afraflacilla braunsi is a jumping spider that was first described by George and Elizabeth Peckham in 1903. The type specimens were sent to them by Dr Brauns. They allocated it to the genus Pseudicius with the name Pseudicius braunsii. First circumscribed by Eugène Simon in 1885, the genus Pseudicius has a name that is related to two Greek words that can be translated false and honest. In the 1980s, it was noted that there were many similarities between species in Pseudicius and others in the genus Icius. Indeed, Ekaterina Andreeva, Stefania Hęciak and Prószyński had looked to combine the genera in 1984. The two have similar spermathecal structure but work by Wayne Maddison in 1987 demonstrated that they have sufficiently different DNA to be considered different genera. In the specific case of Pseudicius braunsii, however, there was sufficient similarity between the species and those in Icius that Jerzy Prószyński moved the species to that genus with the name Icius braunsi in that year.

In 2017, Prószyński moved the species to the genus Afraflacilla on the basis of the shape of the copulatory organs, and the species finally gained the name by which it is now known. It was one of many species that were transferred between the two genera at the time. Afraflacilla had in 1993 been reinstated by Marek Zabka, having been absorbed into the genus Pseudicius based on the similarity between the genera. Afraflacilla had originally been circumscribed by Lucien Berland and Jacques Millot in 1941. The genus had been made a member of the tribe Heliophaninae, which is ubiquitous throughout the Old World. Wayne Maddison renamed the tribe Chrysillini in 2015. The tribe is a member of the clade Saltafresia within the clade Salticoida in the subfamily Salticinae.

In 2017, Prószyński allocated the genus to the Pseudiciines group of genera, which he named after the genus Pseudicius. They can be distinguished from other jumping spiders by their flattened and elongated body and characteristic colour patterns.

=== Synonyms ===
Since it was first described, the spider has been synonymised with other species names. In 1989, Prószyński described a new species that he named Pseudicius tripunctatus based on an example found in Saudi Arabia. He noted that it had different copulatory organs to Pseudicius bipunctatus, Pseudicius tamaricis and Pseudicius wadis, but did not give a comparison to P. braunsi. In 1996, Wanda Wesołowska identified an example of the species in Turkmenistan. Based on similarities between this female and the holotype of the related Afraflacilla arabica, she named that species as a synonym of P. braunsi.

In 2005, Dmitri Logunov and Mehrdad Zamanpoore separated A. arabica from P. braunsi on the basis of the structure of the spiders' copulatory organs. While recognising difficulties with this, including the fact that they did not have access to a male and female found together, they saw sufficient difference between the examples they did have access to, particularly the male, to make A. arabica its own species again. They also suggested that P. tripunctatus was probably a synonym of Pseudicius spiniger. Two years later, Wesołowska and Antonius van Harten rejected this relationship with P. spiniger and synonymised P. tripunctatus with P. braunsi on the basis of the male's copulatory organs. In 2017, Prószyński moved P. tripunctatus to the genus Afraflacilla, renaming it Afraflacilla tripunctata respectively. Afraflacilla tripunctata is recognised as a synonym for Afraflacilla braunsi.

== Description ==
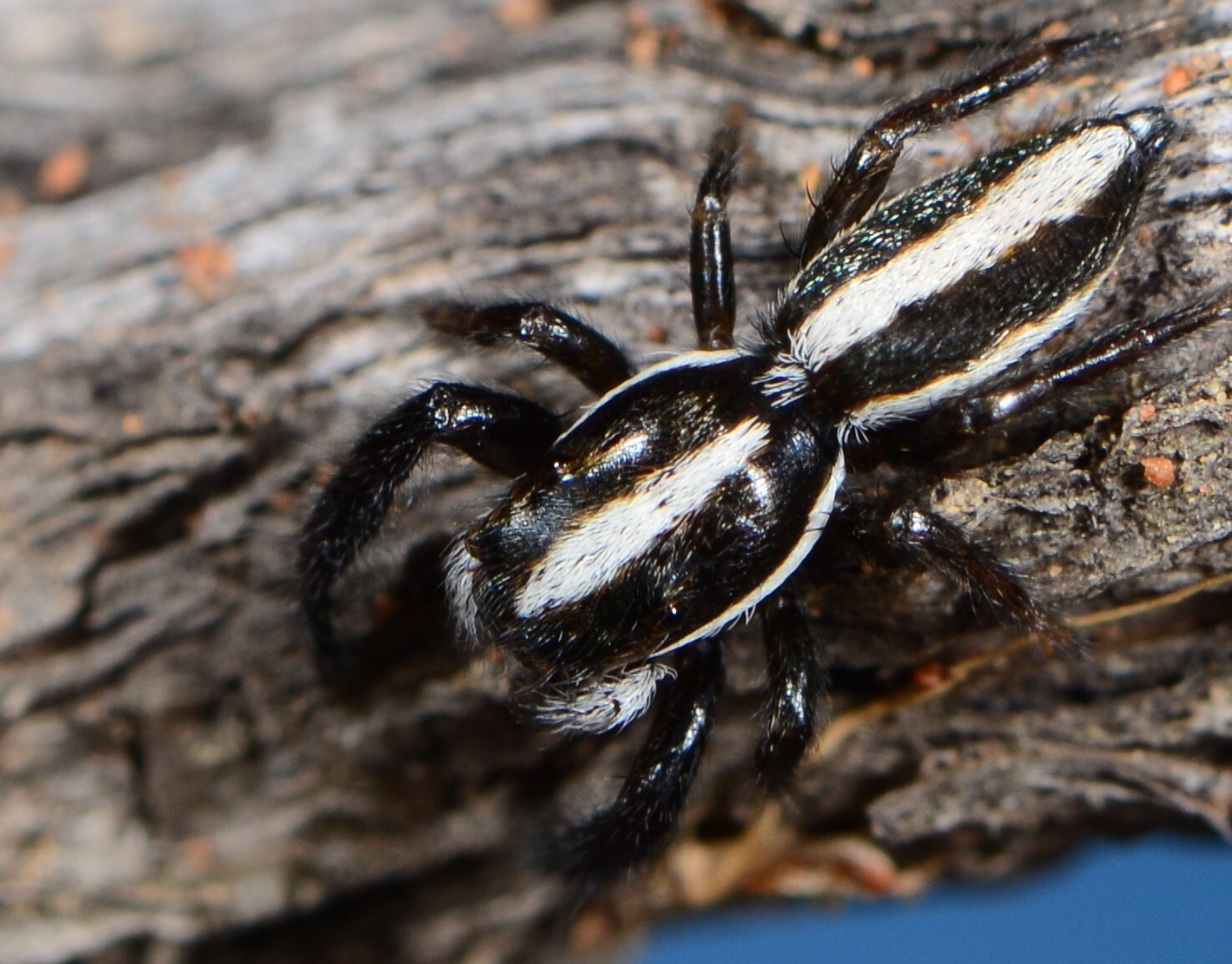
female

Afraflacilla braunsi is a small to medium-sized slender and long spider with unique physical features. The male of the species has a carapace that is between 1.8 and 1.9 mm (0.07 and 0.07 in) long and typically 1.3 mm (0.05 in) wide. It is flat and elongated with a clearly visible fovea. There are two black patches, long brown bristles and thin grey hairs on the eye field and black rings and white scales around the eyes. There is a white band that crosses the spiders' face, or clypeus. The top is brown, occasionally with orange sides. It has a white band that thins towards the back. The sides have white hairs and the underside of the carapace, or sternum, is light brown. The spider has mouthparts consisting of dark brown chelicerae, light brown labium and pale tips on the otherwise brown maxilae. The spider has stridulatory apparatus that include short hairs situated under the eyes.

The male spider's abdomen is between 2.2 and 2.4 mm (0.09 and 0.09 in) long and 1.1 and 1.2 mm (0.04 and 0.05 in) wide. It is a brown elongated oval. Some examples are light brown with a vague brownish line across the front and a large darker rear area. Others have a brownish pattern with four lighter patches in the middle and eight large lighter patches to the sides. It is covered in long brown and grey hairs. The underside is greyish-yellow. The spinnerets are brown. The legs are generally yellow apart from the first pair, which are larger, more robust and brown. They all have long brown hairs. The pedipalps are also brown. A key feature of the male is the shape of the palpal bulb, which is very bulbous with a large prominent lobe. It has a very long thin embolus that curves out from the bottom of the bulb. The tibia has a single long and sharp projection, or apophysis.

The female is very similar to the male. The carapace is roughly the same size, between 1.7 and 1.9 mm (0.07 and 0.07 in) long and 1.1 and 1.3 mm (0.04 and 0.05 in) wide, and the abdomen is larger, between 2.7 and 3.2 mm (0.11 and 0.13 in) long and typically 1.5 mm (0.06 in) wide. The female carapace looks externally like the male but lighter. In contrast, the abdomen is fawn with a pattern of yellowish patches that is more pronounced than the male. Like the male, the female spider rubs its front legs against a row of fine hairs located under the eyes to create sounds. The rear, towards the spinnerets, is much darker. The pedipalps are yellow and have a dense covering of long white hairs. The copulatory organs are, again, distinctive. There are two pockets located close to each other to the front of the epigyne. The copulatory openings lead to long coiled insemination ducts and unusually large spermathecae, or receptacles. There are also long accessory glands.

=== Similar spiders ===
The species is similar to others in the genus, many of which were also previously allocated to the genus Pseudicius. In fact, the similarity between this species, then termed Pseudicius braunsii, and Afraflacilla bamakoi was one of the reasons given for synonymising the two genera. It can be distinguished by its copulatory organs. It differs from Afraflacilla altera in the shape of its palpal bulb and for morphology of its apophysis. It is similar to Afraflacilla asorotica in having a triangular lateral protuberance on its palpal bulb, but it is larger in this species. It differs from Afraflacilla bamakoi in its longer embolus, the structure of the tegular apophysis and the position of the bulge on the tegulum.

== Distribution and habitat ==
Afraflacilla braunsi lives in Saudi Arabia, South Africa, Turkmenistan, United Arab Emirates and Yemen. Although relatively rare, it is thought that the species is widely distributed. The first example was found in Willowmore, which is now in Eastern Cape, South Africa. The first example to be found outside South Africa was discovered in the Repetek Biosphere State Reserve in Turkmenistan in 1980. Logunov, who identified the sample as an example of the species noted the huge gap between these finds and attributed it to the poor understanding of jumping spiders. Other examples were also noted in Asia. The example from Saudi Arabia originally called Pseudicius tripunctatus was a female first found in Ash-Sharaʼiʽ in 1978. The species has been seen across Yemen, thriving in the Dhamar, Sanaa, Taiz Governorates. It has been discovered living near the cities of Sanaa and Taiz, and in the Al Manar District, near a village called Hammam 'Ali, the first example being found in 1997. The first specimen to be seen in the United Arab Emirates was described in 2020. It had been found in Al Wathba Wetland Reserve in the Emirate of Abu Dhabi.
