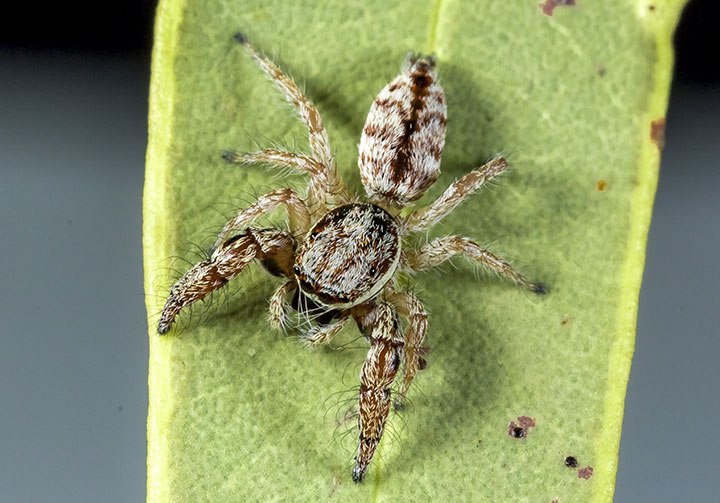
- The related Afraflacilla grayorum

Scientific classification
- Kingdom: Animalia
- Phylum: Arthropoda
- Subphylum: Chelicerata
- Class: Arachnida
- Order: Araneae
- Infraorder: Araneomorphae
- Family: Salticidae
- Genus: Afraflacilla
- Species: A. arabica

Binomial name
- Afraflacilla arabica Wesołowska & van Harten, 1994

Synonyms
- Pseudicius arabicus Logunov & Zamanpoore, 2005

= Afraflacilla arabica =

Species of spider

Afraflacilla arabica is a species of jumping spider in the genus Afraflacilla that lives in Afghanistan, Iran and Yemen. The spider was first described in 1994 by Wanda Wesołowska and Antonius van Harten. The spider is small to medium-sized, with an elongated brown carapace that is between 1.7 and 1.85 long and an oval greyish-brown abdomen between 2.25 and 3.0 mm long. The female and male are similar externally, differing mainly in the male's larger and thicker brown front legs that mount stridulatory apparatus. The remainder of the legs are smaller and yellow. The female is also slightly lighter. The spiders have distinctive copulatory organs. The male has a long embolus extending around the palpal bulb. The female has wide insemination ducts, small spermathecae and large accessory glands.

== Taxonomy ==
Afraflacilla arabica is a species of jumping spider, a member of the family Salticidae, that was first described by Wanda Wesołowska and Antonius van Harten in 1994. It is one of over 500 species identified by the Polish scientist Wesołowska during her career, leading her to be one of the most prolific in the field. They allocated It to the genus Afraflacilla, first circumscribed by Lucien Betland and Jacques Millot in 1941. The genus had only recently, in 1993, been reinstated by Marek Zabka, having been absorbed into the genus Pseudicius based on the similarity between the genera. First circumscribed by Eugène Simon in 1885, Pseudicius is named after two Greek words that can be translated false and honest.

The confusion between Afraflacilla and Pseudicius arose again in 1996. In that year, Wesołowska synonymised Afraflacilla arabica with Pseudicius braunsi based on a specimen found in Turkmenistan in 1987. in 2005, Dmitri Logunov and Mehrdad Zamanpoore again defined the species as valid, but under the name Pseudicius arabicus, based on examples found in Afghanistan. While recognising difficulties with this, including the fact that they did not have access to a male and female found together, they saw sufficient difference between the examples they did have access to, particularly the female, to make the judgement. This was disputed by Wesołowska and van Harten in 2007, who stated that the Afghan male example not to be a member of the species. However, this meant that Pseudicius arabicus was defined just by the examples they had first discovered. In 2016, Jerzy Prószyński moved the species back to the genus Afraflacilla on the basis of the shape of the copulatory organs. It was one of more than 40 species that were transferred between the two genera at the time. This took the species back to its original name.

Prószyński allocated the genus to the Pseudiciines group of genera in 2017, which was named after the genus Pseudicius. They can be distinguished from other jumping spiders by their flattened and elongated body and characteristic colour patterns. The genus is a member of the tribe Chrysillini, which had previously known as Heliophaninae. It is ubiquitous across most continents of the world. Chrysillines are monophyletic. The tribe is a member of the clade Saltafresia within the subfamily Salticoida. Logunov and Zamanpoore speculated that the species may be the same as Pseudicius asoroticus based on the similarity of the species apart from the insemination ducts on the female but this is not proven.

== Description ==
Afraflacilla arabica is a small flattened spider. The male has a carapace that is typically 1.7 mm (0.07 in) long and 1.4 mm (0.06 in) wide. It is brown with a covering of short dark hairs. The eye field is darker, nearly black, with a few brown bristles around the eyes themselves. The spider's face, or clypeus, is very low. It has brown mouthparts, including its chelicerae, labium and maxilae. The underside of the carapace, or sternum, is also brown. The oval abdomen is an elongated oval typically 3.0 mm (0.12 in) long and 1.4 mm (0.06 in) wide. It has a greyish-brown topside with an indistinct yellow pattern. The underside is light. It has dark spinnerets. The legs are generally yellow apart from the first pair, which are larger, thicker and brown. The spider has stridulatory apparatus that is typical for the genus. The spider rubs its front legs against a row of fine hairs on the side of the carapace. It has distinctive copulatory organs. The pedipalps are brown. There is a straight projection, or apophyses on the tibia. A long thin embolus curves out from the bottom and over the top of the palpal bulb.

The female is very similar to the male. The carapace is larger, typically 1.85 mm (0.07 in) long and 1.28 mm (0.05 in) wide, and the abdomen is smaller, typically 2.25 mm (0.09 in) long and 1.35 mm (0.05 in) wide. The carapace is generally a lighter brown but is otherwise similar. The mouthparts are similar. The abdomen is also similar on the topside, although the underside is yellow. Unlike in the male, the front pair of legs are similar to the others. They are all yellow with brown patches visible near the leg joints. The copulatory openings lead to wide insemination ducts and small spermathecae. There are large accessory glands.

The species is similar to others in the genus, many of which have also been previously allocated to the genus Pseudicius. It can be distinguished by its copulatory organs. For example, the male differs from Afraflacilla altera, Afraflacilla bamakoi and Afraflacilla similis in the shape of the palpal bulb and form of the apophysis.

== Distribution and habitat ==
Afraflacilla arabica lives in Afghanistan, Iran and Yemen. The male holotype was found near Sanaa, Yemen, in 1991. The first to be discovered living in Afghanistan, and the first example of a female, was found in 1963 in Kabul. The first example to be identified in Iran was found near Kerman in 1970.
