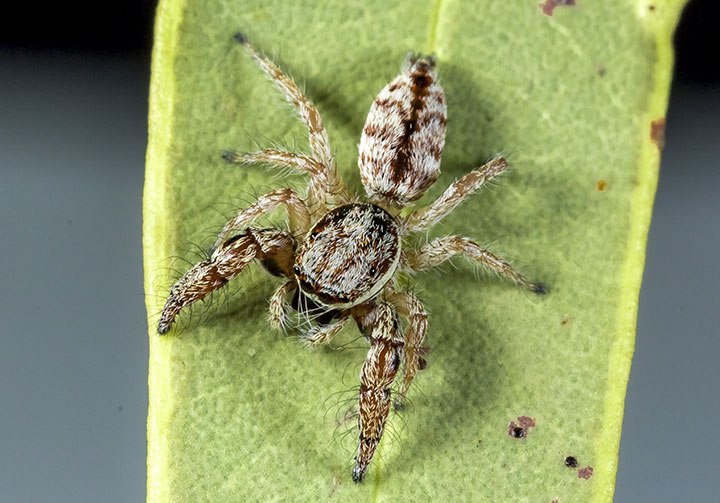
- The related Afraflacilla grayorum

Scientific classification
- Kingdom: Animalia
- Phylum: Arthropoda
- Subphylum: Chelicerata
- Class: Arachnida
- Order: Araneae
- Infraorder: Araneomorphae
- Family: Salticidae
- Genus: Afraflacilla
- Species: A. imitator

Binomial name
- Afraflacilla imitator (Wesołowska & Haddad, 2013)

Synonyms
- Pseudicius imitator Wesołowska & Haddad, 2013

= Afraflacilla imitator =

Hogsback Afraflacilla Jumping Spider

Species of spider

Afraflacilla imitator is a species of jumping spider in the genus Afraflacilla that lives in South Africa. The spider was first described in 2013 by Wanda Wesołowska and Charles Haddad. Originally allocated to the genus Pseudicius, it was moved to its current name by Jerzy Prószyński in 2016. The spider is small to medjum-sized, with a carapace that is between 1.6 and 2.0 long and an abdomen between 1.9 and 3.6 mm long. The female is larger than the male, with a lighter carapace and an abdominal pattern that eight white spots in pairs on a brown background compared to the six paired white spots on a black background that identifies the male. Both have a black eye field. The legs are generally yellow, apart from the front pair on the male, which are brown, longer and stouter. The male has a long embolus that curves over its palpal bulb. The female has an oval epigyne that has wide insemination ducts and long accessory glands. The spiders are very similar to the related Afraflacilla venustula, from which they get their name, but may be distinguished by a study of their copulatory organs.

== Taxonomy ==
Afraflacilla imitator is a species of jumping spider, a member of the family Salticidae, that was first described by Wanda Wesołowska and Charles Haddad in 2013. It is one of over 500 species identified by Wesołowska during her career, leading her to be one of the most prolific scientists in the field. They originally allocated the species to the genus Pseudicius. First circumscribed by Eugène Simon in 1885, the genus is named after two Greek words that can be translated false and honest. The species is named after a Latin word that can be translated "imitator" and relates to its similarity to the related Afraflacilla venustula.

The genus Pseudicius was made a member of the tribe Heliophaninae, which is ubiquitous across most continents of the world. Wayne Maddison renamed the tribe Chrysillini in 2015. The tribe is a member of the clade Saltafresia within the subfamily Salticoida. A year later, in 2016, Jerzy Prószyński moved the species to the genus Afraflacilla on the basis of the shape of the copulatory organs. It was one of more than 40 species that were transferred between the two genera at the time. Afraflacilla had been circumscribed by Lucien Betland and Jacques Millot in 1941. It is also a member of the tribe Chrysillini. Prószyński allocated the genus to the Pseudiciines group of genera in 2017, which was named after the genus Pseudicius. They can be distinguished from other jumping spiders by their flattened and elongated body and characteristic colour patterns.

== Description ==
Afraflacilla imitator is a small to medium-sized spider with an elongated shape. The male has a carapace that is between 1.6 and 1.7 mm (0.06 and 0.07 in) long and 1.0 and 1.2 mm (0.04 and 0.05 in) wide. Flattened, it is dark brown with a covering of short greyish hairs. The eye field is black with a few brown bristles and white and fawn scales-like hairs around the eyes themselves. The spider has brown mouthparts, including its chelicerae, labium and maxilae. The underside of the carapace, or sternum, is also brown. The abdomen is between 1.9 and 2.0 mm (0.07 and 0.08 in) long and 1.2 and 1.3 mm (0.05 and 0.05 in) wide. It is elongated and has a black topside with a pattern of six white spots arranged in pairs. The underside is greyish-brown. It has dark spinnerets. The legs are generally brownish, covered in fine brown hairs, apart from the first pair. These are larger, dark brown with a swollen tibia and marked with sharp spines. The spider has distinctive copulatory organs. The pedipalps are brown with a tibia that has three projections, or apophyses: a forked one in the middle, a longer one with a forked tip towards the bottom and a smaller toothlike one towards the top. The palpal bulb is rounded and has a long thin embolus that runs out from the bottom, around the top and then beyond, pointing away at an angle.

The female is very similar to the male, but larger. The carapace is between 1.9 and 2.0 mm (0.07 and 0.08 in) long and 1.1 and 1.3 mm (0.04 and 0.05 in) wide and the abdomen is between 1.9 and 3.6 mm (0.07 and 0.14 in) long and 2.1 and 2.3 mm (0.08 and 0.09 in) wide. The carapace is generally a lighter brown but is otherwise similar with a black eye field. The mouthparts are similar. The abdomen is covered in brown and white hairs and has a pattern of a cream band along the front edge and eight spots in pairs on a brown background. Unlike in the male, the front pair of legs are similar to the others. They are all yellow. The spider has an oval epigyne that has two rounded depressions to the front and two pouches to the rear. The copulatory openings lead to wide insemination ducts that follow a complex route to relatively small spermathecae. There are long accessory glands.

The species is similar to others in the genus, many of which were also previously allocated to the genus Pseudicius. It is the copulatory organs that enable them to be separated. For example, while the spider is externally very similar to the related Afraflacilla venustula, the male differs in the shape of the palpal bulb and the way that the embolus curves while the female has shorter insemination ducts and longer accessory glands than the other spider.

== Behaviour ==
Jumping spiders rarely use webs and instead use their good eyesight to hunt prey. The related Afraflacilla venustula is known to be particularly active in the early and mid-morning, and mid-afternoon. They create silk cocoons, in which the males are often co-habit with subadult females. Female spiders are known to stay with the egg sacs until the babies emerged from their eggs. The spiders use visual displays during courtship and transmits vibratory signals through silk to communicate to other spiders.

== Distribution and habitat ==
Afraflacilla imitator is endemic to South Africa. The holotype was found near Hogsback in the Amathole Mountains in 2011 at an altitude of 1,180 m (3,870 ft) above sea level. Other examples were also found in the local area. The species thrives in Afromontane forest, particularly the trees in canopy fogging mixed forest.
