= Afraflacilla albopunctata =

Scientific classification
- Kingdom: Animalia
- Phylum: Arthropoda
- Subphylum: Chelicerata
- Class: Arachnida
- Order: Araneae
- Infraorder: Araneomorphae
- Family: Salticidae
- Genus: Afraflacilla
- Species: A. albopunctata

Binomial name
- Afraflacilla albopunctata Wesołowska & Russell-Smith, 2022

Species of jumping spider

Afraflacilla albopunctata is a species of jumping spiders in the genus Afraflacilla that lives in Ivory Coast. The spider is small, with a cephalothorax that is typically 2 mm (0.08 in) long and an abdomen typically 2.7 mm (0.11 in) long. Its carapace is brown with a darker eye field while its abdomen is mainly brown with two yellow streaks across the middle and four white spots surrounded by a black area towards the back. Its. legs are also brown. It is similar to the related Afraflacilla tarajalis but can be identified in its copulatory organs. The female has two pockets in its epigyne and long looping insemination ducts. The male has not been described.

== Taxonomy and etymology ==
Afraflacilla albopunctata is a species of jumping spider, a member of the family Salticidae, that was first described by Wanda Wesołowska and Anthony Russell-Smith in 2022. They allocated It to the genus Afraflacilla, first circumscribed by Lucien Betland and Jacques Millot in 1941. The genus had been reinstated by Marek Zabka, having been previously absorbed into the genus Pseudicius based on the similarity between the genera. This was supported in 2017 by Jerzy Prószyński.

The genus had been made a member of the tribe Heliophaninae, which is ubiquitous across most continents of the world. Wayne Maddison renamed the monotypic tribe Chrysillini in 2015. The tribe is a member of the clade Saltafresia within the subfamily Salticoida. In 2017, Prószyński allocated the genus to the Pseudiciines group of genera, which he named after the genus Pseudicius. They can be distinguished from other jumping spiders by their flattened and elongated body and characteristic colour patterns.

== Description ==
Afraflacilla albopunctata is a small spider that is similar to the related Afraflacilla tarajalis. The female has a cephalothorax that is typically 2 mm (0.08 in) long, 1.2 mm (0.05 in) wide and 0.8 mm (0.03 in) high. Its carapace, the hard upper part of the cephalothorax, is flat and brown with a coating of white hairs on top and long brown bristles on the front edge. It has a darker eye field that is black around the eyes, some of which have white tufts of hair between them. The underside of the cephalothorax, or sternum, is brown. The spiders' face, or clypeus is low and is covered in white hairs, Its mouthparts are also brown.

The spider's abdomen is ovoid, measuring typically 2.7 mm (0.11 in) long and 1.6 mm (0.06 in) wide. The topside is mainly brown, although the back third is blackish with a pattern of four small white round patches. There are two broad streaks of yellow that cross the middle. The whole surface is hairy. The underside of the abdomen is dark yellow and marked with a dark line that runs down the middle. The spider's spinnerets are black and grey. Its legs are brown, the front legs darker than the rest, and have brown hairs and spines.

The female has distinctive copulatory organs. Its epigyne, the external visible part of its copulatory organs, has two pockets placed side by side and large copulatory openings that are placed far apart. These lead to simple insemination ducts that follow a path of loops and terminate in relatively short and wide tube-like spermathecae or receptacles. It is the longer path that these ducts follow that differentiates the species. The male has not been identified.

== Distribution ==
Although some species have been seen in Europe, Afraflacilla spiders live mainly in Africa south of the Sahara. Afraflacilla albopunctata is endemic to Ivory Coast. The female holotype for the species was found in Lamto during 1975.
