= Afraflacilla sengwaensis =

Scientific classification
- Kingdom: Animalia
- Phylum: Arthropoda
- Subphylum: Chelicerata
- Class: Arachnida
- Order: Araneae
- Infraorder: Araneomorphae
- Family: Salticidae
- Genus: Afraflacilla
- Species: A. sengwaensis

Binomial name
- Afraflacilla sengwaensis (Wesołowska & Cumming, 2011)

Species of spider

Afraflacilla sengwaensis is a species of jumping spider in the genus Afraflacilla that lives in Zimbabwe. It is found in the Sengwa Wildlife Research Area, after which it is named. The spider was first described in 2011 by Wanda Wesołowska and Meg Cumming. The female has not been identified. The species is very similar to Afraflacilla venustula, including the pattern on the abdomen. It is a small spider, with a cephalothorax that is typically 1.8 mm (0.071 in) long and an abdomen typically 2.3 mm (0.091 in) long. It can be most easily distinguished from other members of the genus by its copulatory organs. The palpal bulb has a distinctive irregular shape, as is the embolus base.

== Taxonomy ==
Afraflacilla sengwaensis is a jumping spider that was first described by Wanda Wesołowska and Meg Cumming in 2011. They initially allocated the species to the genus Pseudicius, first raised by Eugène Simon in 1885. The genus was provisionally placed alongside Icius. The two genera were placed in the tribe Heliophaninae alongside Afraflacilla and Marchena.Maddison renamed the tribe Chrysillini in 2015. The tribe is a member of the clade Saltafresia within the subfamily Salticoida.

In 2024, Charles Haddad, Konrad Wiśniewski and Wesołowska moved the species to the genus Afraflacilla. Afraflacilla had been circumscribed by Lucien Betland and Jacques Millot in 1941. It is also a member of the tribe Chrysillini. Prószyński allocated the genus to the Pseudiciines group of genera in 2017, which was named after the genus Pseudicius. They can be distinguished from other jumping spiders by their flattened and elongated body and characteristic colour patterns. The species name derives from the name of the Sengwa Wildlife Research Area.

== Description ==
Afraflacilla sengwaensis is a small spider with an elongated body typical of the genus. The male has a cephalothorax that is typically 1.8 mm (0.071 in) long and 1.2 mm (0.047 in) wide. It has a flat oval, dark brown carapace covered in delicate hairs. The eye field has brown bristles and white scales near the eyes. The chelicerae, labium and sternum are brownish. The elongated abdomen is typically 2.3 mm (0.091 in) long and 1.1 mm (0.043 in) wide. It is blackish with a pattern of eight white spots in pairs, similar to Afraflacilla venustula. The underside is light and the spinnerets are brown. The legs are light brown apart from the first pair, which are darker. The front legs are also swollen and thicker. The pedipalps has two tibial apophyses, one longer than the other. The palpal bulb is irregular in shape and a long thin embolus. The species differs from others in the genus in the shape of palpal bulb and the position of its embolus base. The female has not been described.

== Distribution and habitat ==
Afraflacilla sengwaensis is endemic to Zimbabwe. The holotype was found in the Sengwa Wildlife Research Area during 2002. The species is tree-dwelling. It has particularly been found living in Vachellia tortilis.
