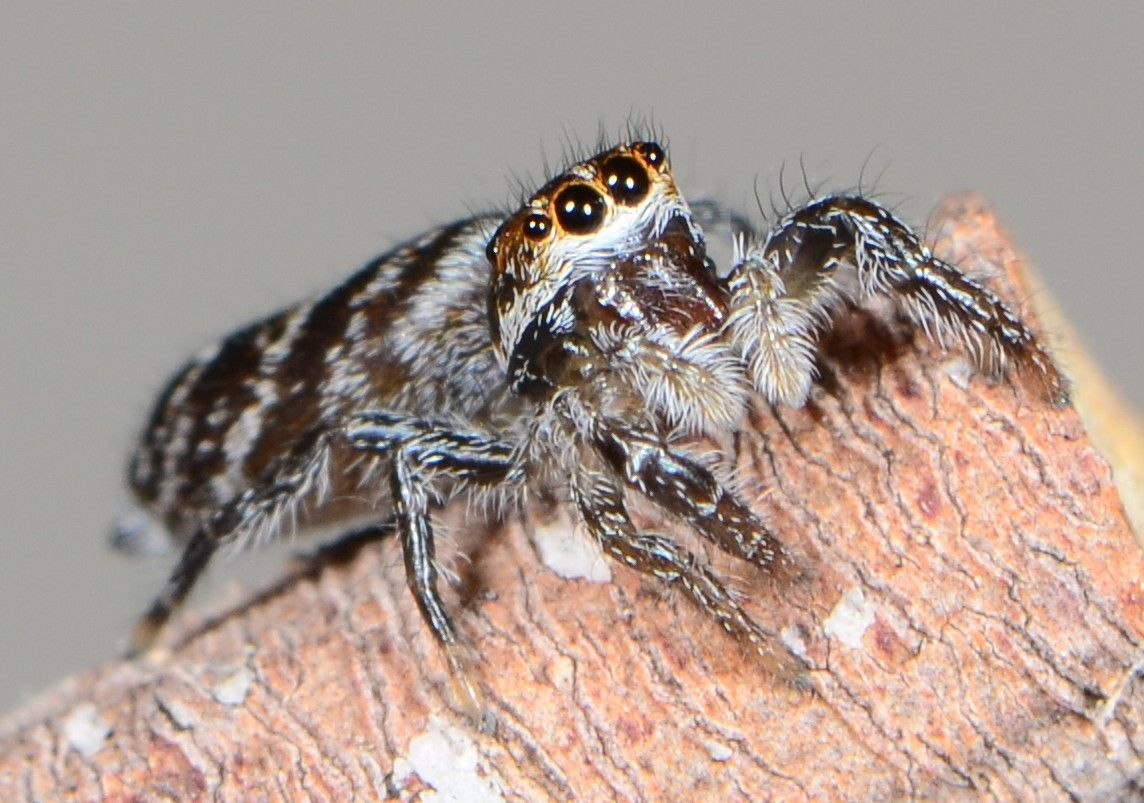
- female
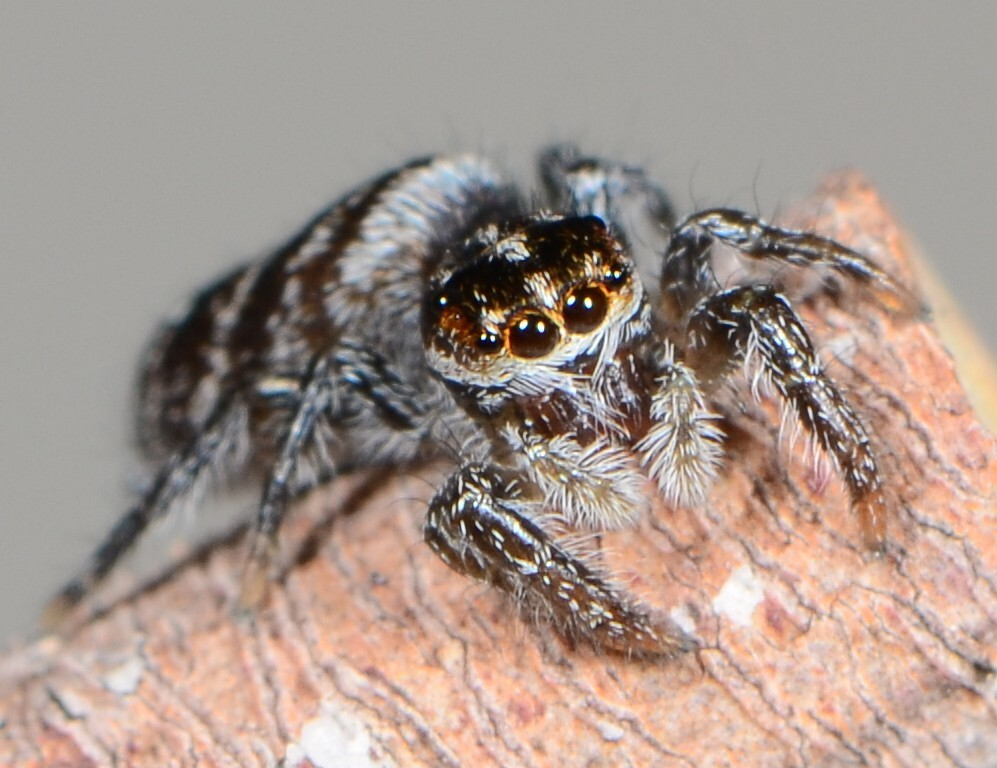
- female

Scientific classification
- Kingdom: Animalia
- Phylum: Arthropoda
- Subphylum: Chelicerata
- Class: Arachnida
- Order: Araneae
- Infraorder: Araneomorphae
- Family: Salticidae
- Genus: Afraflacilla
- Species: A. bipunctata

Binomial name
- Afraflacilla bipunctata (Peckham & Peckham, 1903)

Synonyms
- Pseudicius bipunctatus Peckham & Peckham, 1903

= Afraflacilla bipunctata =

Willowmore Afraflacilla Jumping Spider

Species of spider

Afraflacilla bipunctata is a species of jumping spider in the family Salticidae. It is endemic to South Africa and is commonly known as the Willowmore Afraflacilla jumping spider.

== Distribution ==
Afraflacilla bipunctata is found only in South Africa, where it has been recorded from Eastern Cape (Willowmore) and Western Cape (Aardvark Nature Reserve).

== Habitat and ecology ==
This is a free-living plant-dwelling species sampled from the Fynbos and Nama Karoo biomes at an altitude of approximately 855 m.

== Conservation ==
The species is listed as Data Deficient for taxonomic reasons. Threats to the species are unknown but additional sampling is needed to collect the male and determine the species' range.

== Taxonomy ==
Afraflacilla bipunctata was originally described as Pseudicius bipunctatus by George and Elizabeth Peckham in 1903 from Willowmore in the Eastern Cape. The species is known only from the female and was transferred to Afraflacilla by Prószyński in 2017.
