= Afraflacilla gunbar =

Scientific classification
- Kingdom: Animalia
- Phylum: Arthropoda
- Subphylum: Chelicerata
- Class: Arachnida
- Order: Araneae
- Infraorder: Araneomorphae
- Family: Salticidae
- Genus: Afraflacilla
- Species: A. gunbar

Binomial name
- Afraflacilla gunbar Zabka & Gray, 2002

Species of spider

Afraflacilla gunbar is a species of jumping spider in the family Salticidae that is endemic to Australia, and known only from its type locality (Gunbar, New South Wales).

It was first described in 2002 by Marek Zabka and Michael Gray.
