= Afraflacilla tarajalis =

Scientific classification
- Kingdom: Animalia
- Phylum: Arthropoda
- Subphylum: Chelicerata
- Class: Arachnida
- Order: Araneae
- Infraorder: Araneomorphae
- Family: Salticidae
- Genus: Afraflacilla
- Species: A. tarajalis

Binomial name
- Afraflacilla tarajalis Miñano & Tamajón, 2017

Species of jumping spider

Afraflacilla tarajalis is a species of jumping spider in the genus Afraflacilla that lives around the Mediterranean Sea, including Greece, Morocco, Portugal and Spain. The spider is externally similar to the related Afraflacilla fayda, Afraflacilla mushrif and Afraflacilla roberti. The female is particularly hard to identify, although the large copulatory openings on its the external part of its copulatory organs, or epigyne, and, internally, its relatively short and wide tube-like spermathecae help to distinguish it. It is a small spider, measuring between 4.08 and 6.03 mm (0.16 and 0.24 in) in length. The female is generally light grey, sometimes darker and brownish, and have brown or orange stripes and a blackish spot on the rear part of body, its opisthosoma. The male is darker, greyish or brownish, and also has a dark stripe running down its opisthosoma, which is otherwise brown, reddish-brown or reddish-orange. It is this pattern that helps the spider hide amongst Tamarix trees that it lives amongst and after which it is named.

== Taxonomy ==
Afraflacilla tarajalis is a species of jumping spider, a member of the family Salticidae, that was first described by Jesús Miñano and Rafael Tamajón in 2017. They allocated it to the genus Afraflacilla, first circumscribed by Lucien Betland and Jacques Millot in 1941. Subsequently absorbed into the genus Pseudicius based on the similarity between the genera by Jerzy Prószyński in 1990, the genus was reinstated by Marek Zabka in 1993. This was supported by Prószyński in 2017.

The genus had been made a member of the tribe Heliophaninae, which is ubiquitous across most continents of the world. Wayne Maddison renamed the monotypic tribe from Heliophaninae to Chrysillini in 2015. The tribe is a member of the clade Saltafresia within the subfamily Salticoida. In 2017, Prószyński allocated the genus to the Pseudiciines group of genera, which he named after the genus Pseudicius. They can be distinguished from other jumping spiders by their flattened and elongated body and characteristic colour patterns.

== Description ==
Afraflacilla tarajalis is a small spider that shows little sexual dimorphism. The female has a total body length of between 4.19 and 4.61 mm (0.16 and 0.18 in), although when pregnant this can extend to 6.03 mm (0.24 in). The spiders are generally light grey, sometimes darker and brownish, although they often are marked with several brown or orange stripes and a blackish spot at the rear of the opisthosoma. his pattern gives the spider a cryptic appearance and helps it camouflage itself on the branches of Tamarix trees, after which it is named. The cephalothorax is generally dark brown. The carapace, the hard upper part of the cephalothorax, is covered in very short orange, reddish-brown and white hairs that form alternating light and dark stripes. The edges are orange with browner areas near the spider's eyes. There are eight or ten bristly tubercles below the eyes that are used for stridulation. There are two spines on the tibia of the front legs and the femur has the tubercles that form the other part of the stridulatory organs. The chelicerae are brown.

The top of the female's opisthosoma is covered in short brown, grey and reddish hairs that form light and dark stripes. To the rear of the abdomen, these are replaced by a narrow zigzag shape and two conjoined spots. The underside of the abdomen is covered in white hairs that have a green tinge. It has distinctive copulatory organs. The epigyne has large copulatory openings that lead to simple insemination ducts that follow a path of three successive loops and terminate in relatively short and wide kidney-shaped spermathecae. The branch for the scent gland is very short and straight, leading from the first loop behind the copulatory funnel. The ducts to the accessory glands are large, with thicker walls than in other species in the genus.

The male is similar in the size to the female, with a cephalothorax that is between 1.88 and 2.18 mm (0.07 and 0.09 in) long and 1.69 and 1.91 mm (0.07 and 0.08 in) wide and a total length between 4.08 and 4.42 mm (0.16 and 0.17 in). It is greyish or brownish, darker than the female, particularly in its cephalothorax and legs. There is a white line on the spider's face, that reaches to the clypeus and an orange marking near the eyes. The stridulatory organs are larger than the female. The chelicerae and labium are very dark brown, nearly black.

The male's opisthosoma is marked with a very dark stripe that runs down the middle that is bordered by white bands. Outside this are narrow bands of brown or reddish-brown hairs, the sides being reddish-orange. Its front legs are longer and darker than the others, and thicker than the equivalent on the female. The male's copulatory organs are distinctive. The pedipalps are light brown and covered in small white hairs. It has a darker cymbium. There is a spike called a retrolateral tibial process that projects from a broad base two-thirds of the way up the palpal bulb and terminates in a pointed tip. The bulb is an elliptical oval with a bulge near the bottom. The embolus is shorter than other members of the genus.

The species is similar to others in the genus, many of which have been previously allocated to the genus Pseudicius. It has a particularly similar morphology to Afraflacilla asorotica and Afraflacilla wadis, although this varies between specimen. Those female examples that are most similar also have simpler arrangements of their insemination ducts. The females are also similar to Afraflacilla fayda and Afraflacilla mushrif found on the Arabian Peninsula and Afraflacilla roberti found in equatorial Africa. The female can be distinguished by its widely separated copulatory openings funnel-shaped insemination ducts and the shape of the spermathecae. The male is identified by the size of its embolus.

== Distribution and habitat ==
Afraflacilla spiders live mainly in Africa south of the Sahara although some species have been seen in Europe. Afraflacilla tarajalis lives in many countries around the Mediterranean Sea and has been observed in Greece, Morocco, Portugal and Spain. The holotype was found on the bank of the river Guadalquivir near Córdoba, Spain in 2000. Other examples were found nearby. Others have been seen in Almería, Ciudad Real, Granada, Huelva, Jaén, Málaga and Murcia. The first time the spider had been seen living in Morocco was in 2010, near Beni Ansar, and in Portugal was in 2014, near Alcoutim. The spider was also observed in Crete, near Faistos, in 2013.

The spider lives in a range of environments. It is commonly seen near rivers. It thrives in forests of Tamarix trees, the first specimen being found living on Tamarix gallica. This is recalled in the specific name. These trees are known in Spain as tarajales or tarayales. Others have been seen on a sandy ridge of a coastal lagoon. The spider lives in areas of human habitation. One specimen was found in Bobadilla railway station.
