= Flacillula lubrica =

Scientific classification
- Kingdom: Animalia
- Phylum: Arthropoda
- Subphylum: Chelicerata
- Class: Arachnida
- Order: Araneae
- Infraorder: Araneomorphae
- Family: Salticidae
- Genus: Flacillula
- Species: F. lubrica

Binomial name
- Flacillula lubrica (Simon, 1901)

Synonyms
- Flacilla lubrica Simon, 1901

Species of spider

Flacillula lubrica is a species of spider of the genus Flacillula. It is endemic to Sri Lanka.
