= Flacillula =

Scientific classification
- Kingdom: Animalia
- Phylum: Arthropoda
- Subphylum: Chelicerata
- Class: Arachnida
- Order: Araneae
- Infraorder: Araneomorphae
- Family: Salticidae
- Subfamily: Salticinae
- Genus: Flacillula; Strand, 1932

Type species
- Flacilla lubrica Simon, 1901

Species
- See text.

Genus of spiders

Flacillula is a spider genus of the jumping spider family, Salticidae, with five described species that occur in the Southeast Asian region. It is closely related to the genus Afraflacilla.

They look flattish, with a long gray body. They are often found on warm walls, rocks and tree trunks.

== Species ==
As of August 2021, the World Spider Catalog accepted the following species:

- Flacillula albofrenata (Simon, 1905) – Java
- Flacillula dothalugala Bopearachchi & Benjamin, 2021 – Sri Lanka
- Flacillula ellaensis Bopearachchi & Benjamin, 2021 – Sri Lanka
- Flacillula henryi Bopearachchi & Benjamin, 2021 – Sri Lanka
- Flacillula hodgsoni Bopearachchi & Benjamin, 2021 – Sri Lanka
- Flacillula incognita Zabka, 1985 – Vietnam
- Flacillula johnstoni Bopearachchi & Benjamin, 2021 – Sri Lanka
- Flacillula lubrica (Simon, 1901) – Sri Lanka
- Flacillula naipauli Bopearachchi & Benjamin, 2021 – Sri Lanka
- Flacillula piyasenai Bopearachchi & Benjamin, 2021 – Sri Lanka
- Flacillula purpurea (Dyal, 1935) – Pakistan
