= Afraflacilla histrionica =

Cape Afraflacilla Jumping Spider

Scientific classification
- Kingdom: Animalia
- Phylum: Arthropoda
- Subphylum: Chelicerata
- Class: Arachnida
- Order: Araneae
- Infraorder: Araneomorphae
- Family: Salticidae
- Genus: Afraflacilla
- Species: A. histrionica

Binomial name
- Afraflacilla histrionica (Simon, 1902)

Synonyms
- Pseudicius histrionicus Simon, 1902

Species of spider

Afraflacilla histrionica is a species of jumping spider in the family Salticidae. It is endemic to South Africa and is commonly known as the Cape Afraflacilla jumping spider.

== Distribution ==
Afraflacilla histrionica is found only in South Africa, where it is known only from the type locality, given as Cape Colony with no exact locality specified.

== Habitat and ecology ==
The habitat of this species is unknown.

== Conservation ==
The species is listed as Data Deficient for taxonomic reasons. Threats to the species are unknown but additional sampling is needed as the status of the species remains obscure.

== Taxonomy ==
Afraflacilla histrionica was originally described as Pseudicius histrionicus by Eugène Simon in 1902, with the type locality given only as Cape Colony. The species is known only from the female and was transferred to Afraflacilla by Prószyński in 2017.
