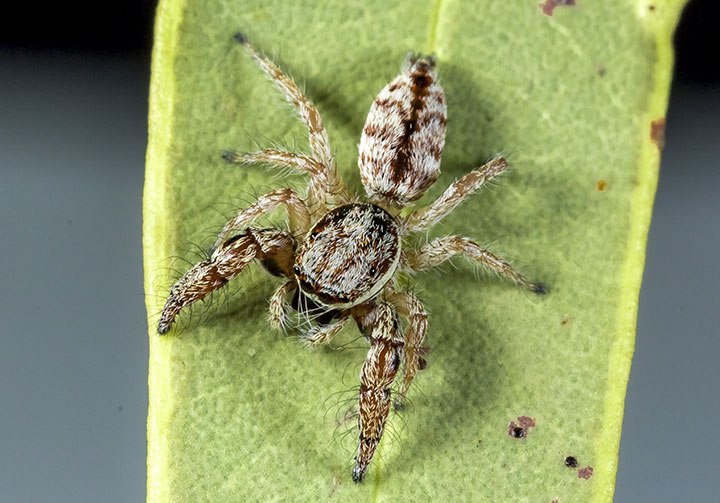

Scientific classification
- Kingdom: Animalia
- Phylum: Arthropoda
- Subphylum: Chelicerata
- Class: Arachnida
- Order: Araneae
- Infraorder: Araneomorphae
- Family: Salticidae
- Genus: Afraflacilla
- Species: A. grayorum

Binomial name
- Afraflacilla grayorum Zabka, 1993

= Afraflacilla grayorum =

Species of spider

Afraflacilla grayorum, (Grays' jumping spider) a stridulating jumping spider is a species of spider in the family Salticidae. It was first described in 1993 by Marek Zabka.

It is found in outback regions of Australia on the bark of smooth eucalypts. and was named in honour of Michael Gray and his wife, Greta.
