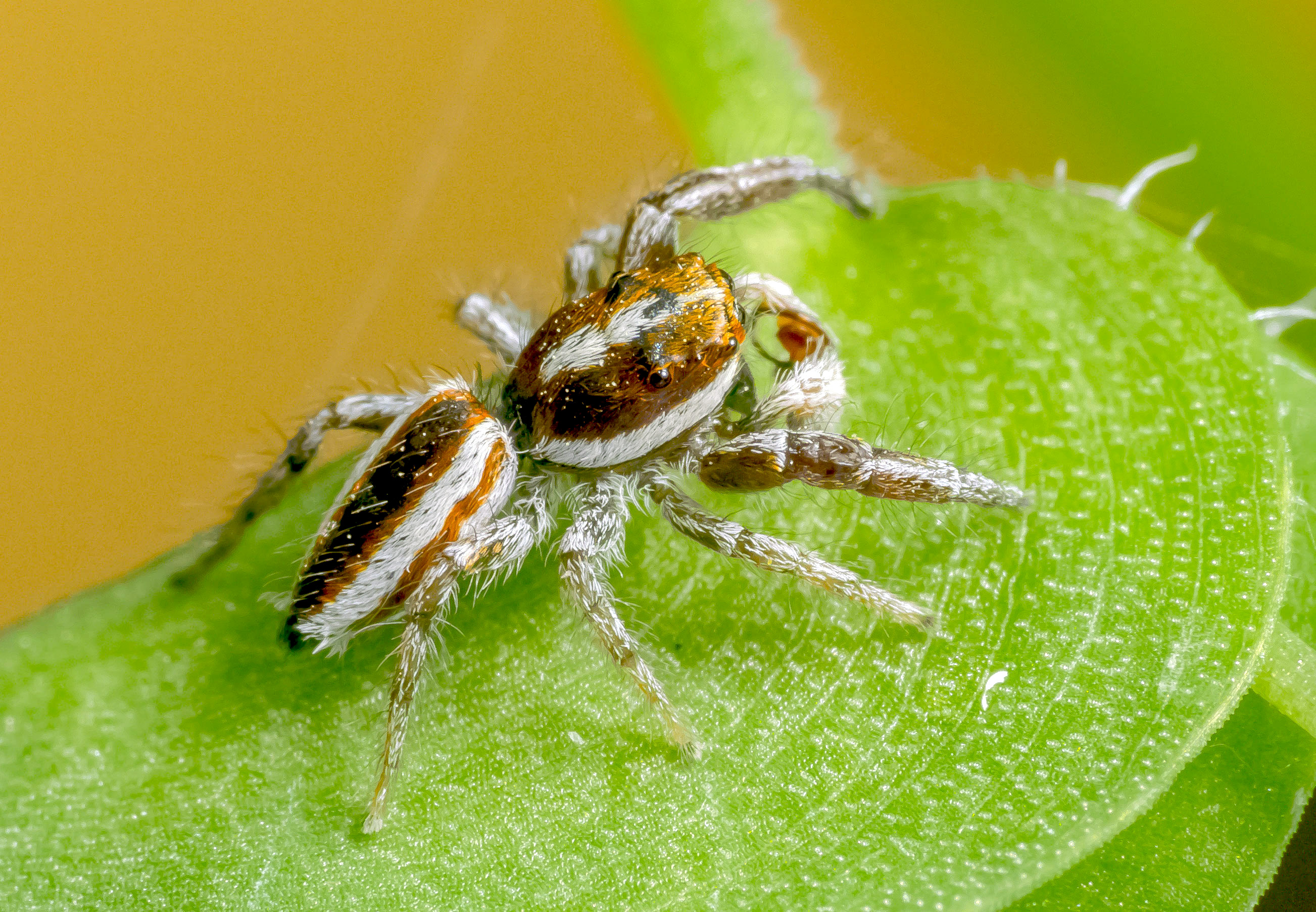
- An unknown example of the Afraflacilla genus

Scientific classification
- Kingdom: Animalia
- Phylum: Arthropoda
- Subphylum: Chelicerata
- Class: Arachnida
- Order: Araneae
- Infraorder: Araneomorphae
- Family: Salticidae
- Genus: Afraflacilla
- Species: A. roberti

Binomial name
- Afraflacilla roberti (Wesołowska, 2011)

= Afraflacilla roberti =

Species of spider

Afraflacilla roberti is a species of jumping spider in the genus Afraflacilla that is found in Kenya. The spider was first defined in 2011 by Wanda Wesołowska. She originally placed the species in the genus Pseudicius, but Jerzy Prószyński moved it in 2017 to Afraflacilla on the basis of shape of its copulatory organs. The species is named after Robert Jackson, the collector who found the first example. The spider is small, with a cephalothorax between 1.7 and 1.6 mm (0.067 and 0.063 in) long and an abdomen between 1.7 and 2.4 mm (0.067 and 0.094 in) long. The female is larger than the male. The carapace is a dark brown elongated oval with a black eye field covered in white hairs. The abdomen is blackish-brown and is marked by two pairs of white patches and a small number of faint chevrons at the very rear. Some female examples have a generally featureless dark abdomen and others have additional small rounded patches at the edge. Some have light stripes to the front of the abdomen. The spider has yellow legs, apart from the front pair, which are brown, longer and stouter. It stridulates using its legs and carapace. Afraflacilla roberti can be differentiated from other species in the genus by its copulatory organs. The male has a long thin tibial apophysis. The female has narrow coiled insemination ducts.

== Taxonomy ==
Afraflacilla roberti is a jumping spider that was first described by the Polish arachnologist Wanda Wesołowska in 2011. It was one of more than 500 species that she identified in her career, which makes her one of the most prolific scientists in the discipline. She allocated the species to the genus Pseudicius, first raised by Eugène Simon in 1885. The genus name is related to two Greek words that can be translated false and honest. The genus was provisionally placed alongside Icius that, despite looking superficially similar, has a different etymology. Indeed, Ekaterina Andreeva, Stefania Hęciak and Jerzy Prószyński looked to combine the genera in 1984. The two genera have similar spermathecal structure but work by Wayne Maddison in 1987 demonstrated that they have very different DNA.

The two genera were placed in the tribe Heliophaninae alongside Afraflacilla and Marchena. The tribe is ubiquitous across most continents of the world. Maddison renamed the tribe Chrysillini in 2015. The tribe is a member of the clade Saltafresia within the subfamily Salticoida. A year later, in 2016, Jerzy Prószyński moved the species to the genus Afraflacilla on the basis of the shape of the copulatory organs. It was one of more than 40 species that were transferred between the two genera at the time.Afraflacilla had been created by Lucien Betland and Jacques Millot in 1941. It is also a member of the tribe Heliophaninae. Prószyński allocated the genus to the Pseudiciines group of genera, which was named after the genus Pseudicius. Afraflacilla roberti is a member of Prószyński's tamaricis group of species. The species is named after Robert Jackson, who first found this and many other species of spider.

== Description ==
Afraflacilla roberti is typical for the species. The species is a very small spider with slender shape. The male has a cephalothorax that is between 1.4 and 1.5 mm (0.055 and 0.059 in) long and 1.0 and 1.1 mm (0.039 and 0.043 in) wide. It has an elongated oval, flat and dark brown carapace with a black eye field. The carapace is covered in white hairs and has a thin line down the middle of the body and two more bands along the sides made of denser white hairs. The area around the eyes is slightly pitted. The spider has light brown mouthparts and a dark yellow sternum. The abdomen is also elongated, blackish-brown and between 1.7 and 1.8 mm (0.067 and 0.071 in) long and 1.1 and 1.2 mm (0.043 and 0.047 in) wide. The top is blackish-brown covered in brown hairs and with a pattern of four patches of white hairs arranged in pairs and a small number of faint chevrons at the very rear. Some examples have light bands towards the front of the abdomen. The underside is light. The spinnerets are light brown. The majority of legs are yellow, and covered in brown hairs. The front legs are longer, stouter and brown with a thick tibia that has two visible spines. It has spines on its legs and carapace that it uses for stridulation. The copulatory organs are similar to others in the genus, differing on details. The pedipalps are light brown. The spider has a distinctively very long thin apophysis, or spike, on the palpal tibia. The spider has a distinctively very long thin apophysis, or spike, on the palpal tibia.

The female is similar to the male. It has a cephalothorax that is between 1.5 and 1.6 mm (0.059 and 0.063 in) long and 1.1 and 1.2 mm (0.043 and 0.047 in) wide and a greyish-beige abdomen between 1.9 and 2.4 mm (0.075 and 0.094 in) long and 1.2 and 1.4 mm (0.047 and 0.055 in) wide. The carapace is similar to the male. The abdomen has a similar pattern with additional small rounded patches at the edge. In some examples, the abdomen is dark and featureless apart from two light bands on the very front. Otherwise, the exterior is similar. The epigyne has two widely separated pockets. The copulatory openings lead, via coiled insemination ducts, to large elongated spermathecae. The epigyne also has long accessory glands.

The spider is similar to others in the genus. The female is typical for the group of related species named tamaricis. It can be distinguished by its narrower and shorter insemination ducts. The male is similar to Pseudicius eximius that lives in nearby Tanzania. It can be identified by the way that the base of the spider's embolus is further from the lobe on the palpal bulb.

== Distribution ==
Afraflacilla roberti lives in Kenya. The holotype, a male, was collected at Mbita Point on Lake Victoria in 1998. Male and female examples have been found in the local area. However, it has not been seen further afield.
