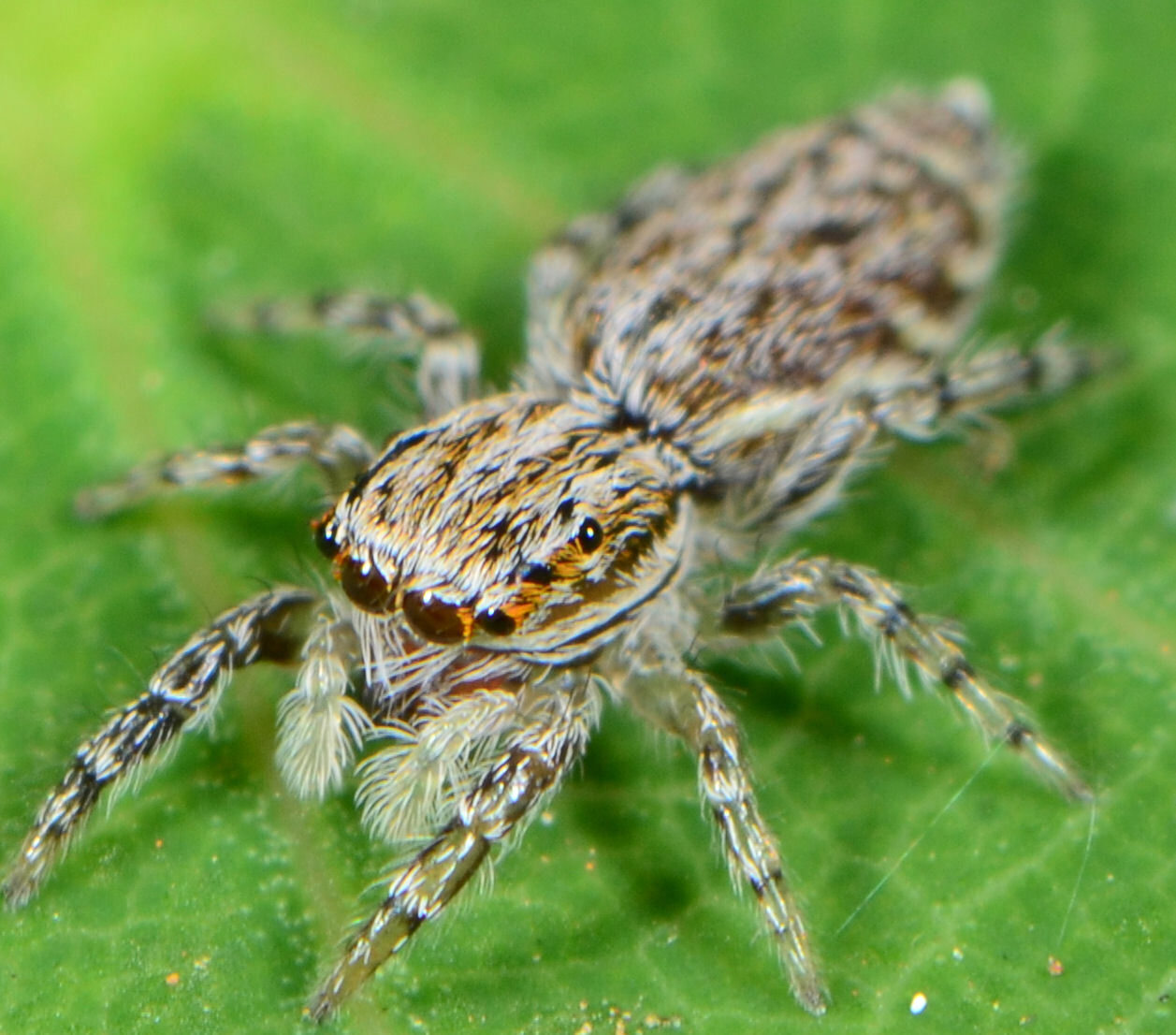
- female
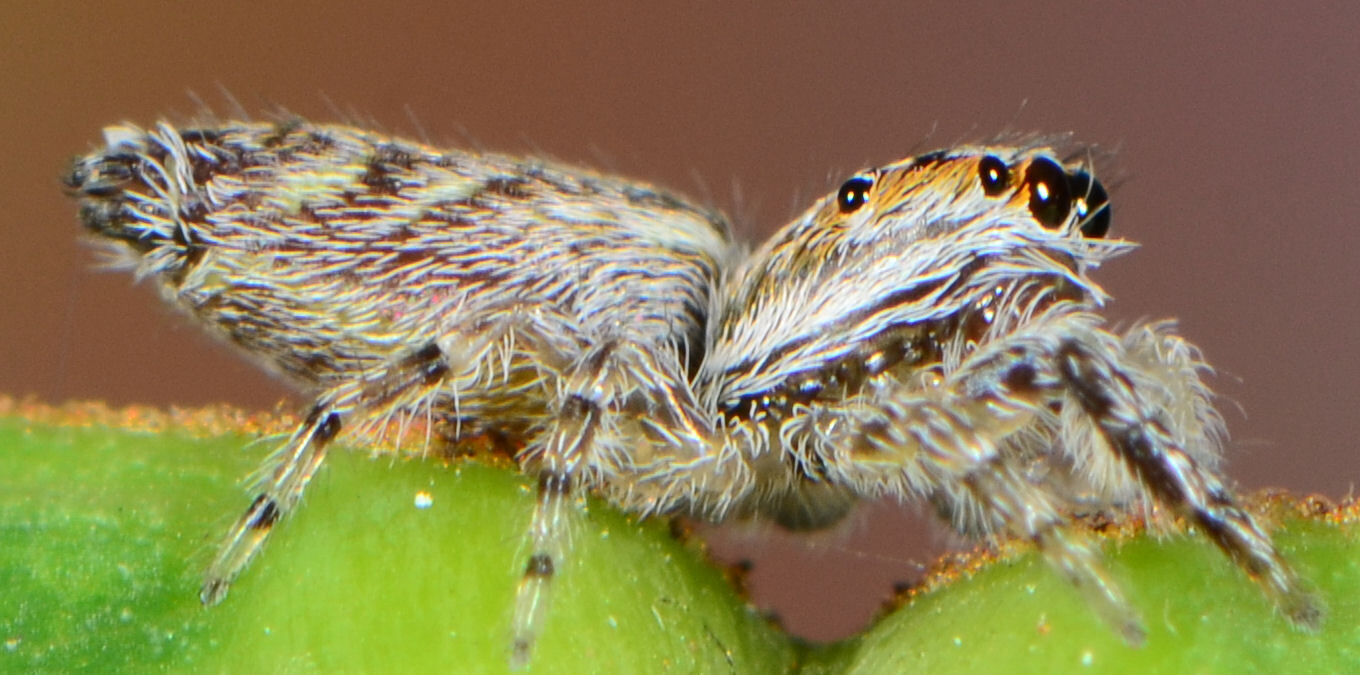
- female

Scientific classification
- Kingdom: Animalia
- Phylum: Arthropoda
- Subphylum: Chelicerata
- Class: Arachnida
- Order: Araneae
- Infraorder: Araneomorphae
- Family: Salticidae
- Genus: Afraflacilla
- Species: A. elegans

Binomial name
- Afraflacilla elegans (Wesołowska & Cumming, 2008)

Synonyms
- Pseudicius elegans Wesołowska & Cumming, 2008

= Afraflacilla elegans =

Zimbabwe Afraflacilla Jumping Spider

Species of spider

Afraflacilla elegans is a species of jumping spider in the family Salticidae. It is found in southern Africa and is commonly known as the Zimbabwe Afraflacilla jumping spider.

== Distribution ==
Afraflacilla elegans is found in South Africa and Zimbabwe.

In South Africa, the species has been recorded from Free State, Gauteng, Limpopo, and North West. Notable localities include Amanzi Private Game Reserve in Free State, Groenkloof Nature Reserve in Gauteng, Goro Game Ranch in Limpopo, and Welgegund in North West.

== Description ==
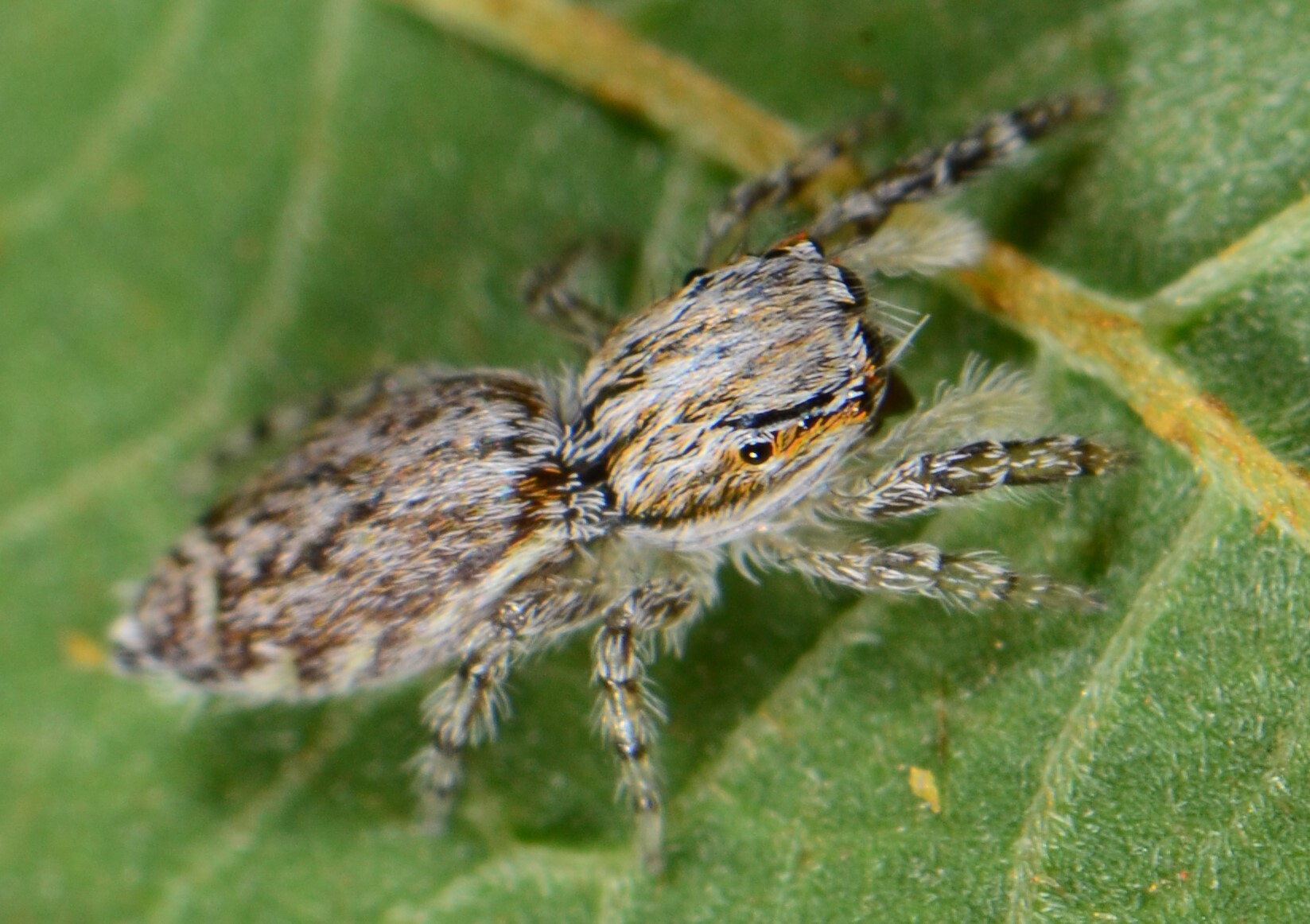
female

== Habitat and ecology ==
Some specimens were collected by fogging in Acacia woodland, indicating that they probably live in the canopy.

The species has also been sampled from grass in the Grassland and Savanna biomes at altitudes ranging from 1202 to 1456 m.

== Conservation ==
Due to its wide geographical range, the species is listed as Least Concern. There are no significant threats to the species. It is protected in Amanzi Private Game Reserve, Goro Game Ranch, and Groenkloof Nature Reserve.

== Taxonomy ==
Afraflacilla elegans was originally described as Pseudicius elegans by Wanda Wesołowska and Cumming in 2008 from Zimbabwe. Additional information was added by Wesołowska and Haddad in 2013, and the species was transferred to Afraflacilla by Prószyński in 2017.
