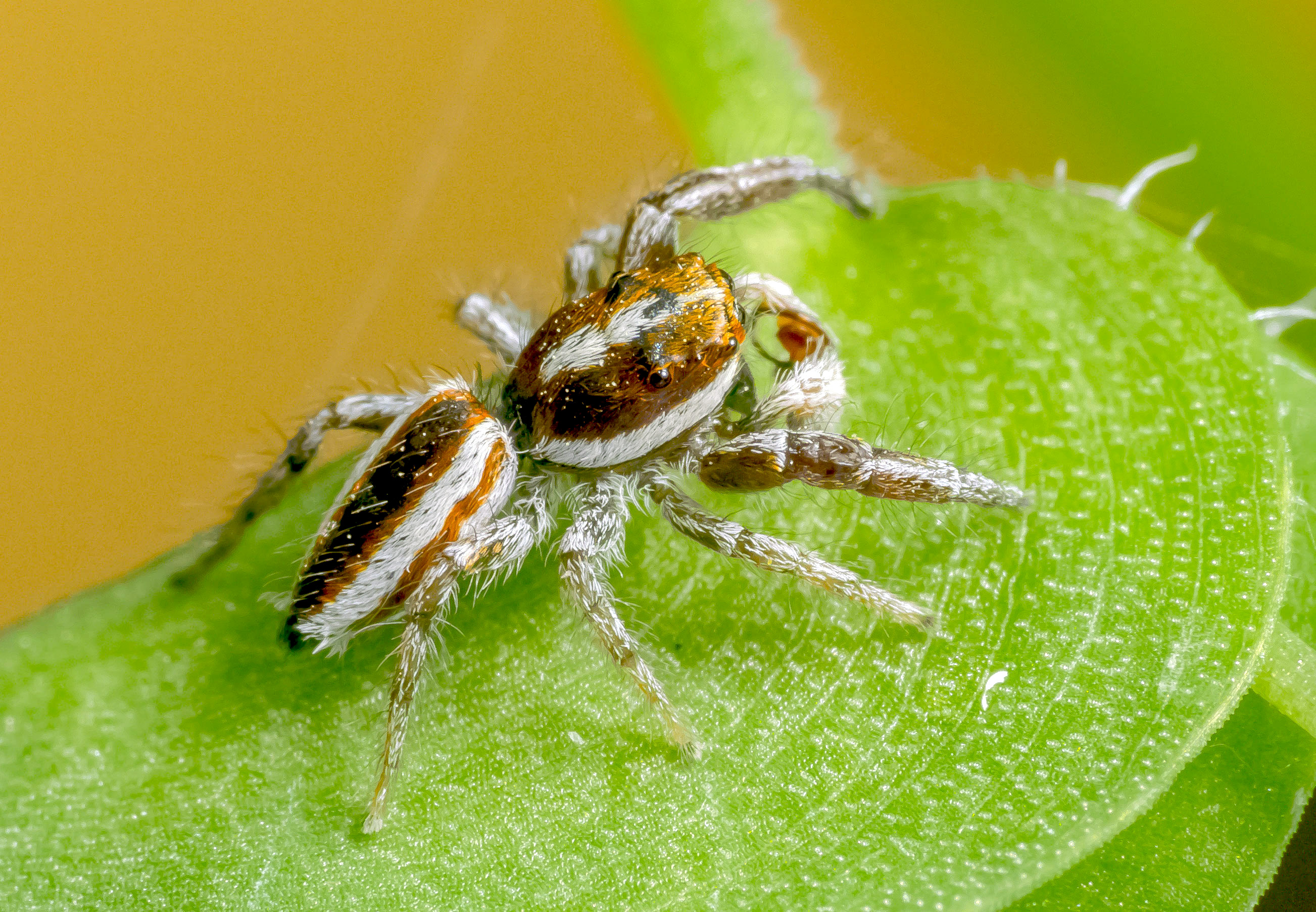
- A spider of the genus Afraflacilla

Scientific classification
- Kingdom: Animalia
- Phylum: Arthropoda
- Subphylum: Chelicerata
- Class: Arachnida
- Order: Araneae
- Infraorder: Araneomorphae
- Family: Salticidae
- Genus: Afraflacilla
- Species: A. mushrif

Binomial name
- Afraflacilla mushrif (Wesołowska & van Harten, 2010)

Synonyms
- Pseudicius mushrif Wesołowska & van Harten, 2010

= Afraflacilla mushrif =

Species of spider

Afraflacilla mushrif is a species of jumping spider in the genus Afraflacilla that lives in the United Arab Emirates. The spider was first described in 2010 by Wanda Wesołowska and Antonius van Harten. It is small, with a cephalothorax typically 2.0 mm (0.08 in) long and an abdomen that is typically 3.9 mm (0.15 in) long. The carapace is reddish-brown with a black eye field marked with two light lines. The abdomen is greyish-brown with a pattern of spots and stripes on top. The spider makes sounds by rubbing its yellow front legs against the area of its carapace under its eyes. It can be distinguished from the related Afraflacilla wadis by its copulatory organs. It has a shorter and wider epigyne, shorter insemination ducts and large unusually-shaped accessory glands than the other species.

== Taxonomy ==
Afraflacilla mushrif is a jumping spider that was first described by Wanda Wesołowska and Antonius van Harten in 2010. It is one of over 500 species identified by the Polish scientist Wesołowska during her career, leading her to be one of the most prolific in the field. They originally allocated the species to the genus Pseudicius, first circumscribed by Eugène Simon in 1885. The genus name is related to two Greek words that can be translated false and honest. The species name recalls the place where it lives.

Pseudicius was provisionally placed alongside the genus Icius. Indeed, Ekaterina Andreeva, Stefania Hęciak and Jerzy Prószyński looked to combine the genera in 1984. The two genera have similar spermathecal structure but work by Wayne Maddison in 1987 demonstrated that they have very different DNA. Despite the names looking similar, they also have very different etymologies. Nonetheless, the two genera were placed in the tribe Heliophaninae alongside Afraflacilla and Marchena. The tribe is ubiquitous across most continents of the world. Maddison renamed the tribe Chrysillini in 2015. The tribe is a member of the clade Saltafresia within the subfamily Salticoida. A year later, in 2016, Jerzy Prószyński moved the species to the genus Afraflacilla on the basis of the shape of the copulatory organs. It was one of more than 40 species that were transferred between the two genera at the time. Afraflacilla had been circumscribed by Lucien Betland and Jacques Millot in 1941. It is also a member of the tribe Chrysillini.

Prószyński allocated the genus to the Pseudiciines group of genera in 2017, which was named after the genus Pseudicius. They can be distinguished from other jumping spiders by their flattened and elongated body and characteristic colour patterns.

== Description ==
Afraflacilla mushrif is a small spider with unique physical features. The spider's body is divided into two main parts, a cephalothorax and an abdomen. The cephalothorax that is typically 2.0 mm (0.08 in) long and 1.5 mm (0.06 in) wide. The female of this species have a carapace, the hard upper part of the cephalothorax, that is oval, low and reddish-brown, with a covering of delicate white hairs. It has a black eye field marked with two diagonal light lines. The spider's face, or clypeus, is also has light hairs. The mouthparts are unusual, with brown chelicerae. The abdomen is significantly larger than the carapace and measures typically 3.9 mm (0.15 in) long and 2.3 mm (0.09 in) wide. It is also oval that is greyish-brown, darker to the end. It has an indistinct pattern of a small number of light spots in the centre and two stripes, that cross from side to side, at the rear. It is covered In very short white hairs. The underside of the abdomen is yellowish. The spinnerets are light. The spider's legs are yellow. The spider has stridulatory apparatus that is typical for the genus for making sounds. The spider rubs a small number of bumps on its front legs against a row of thick bristles underneath the eyes.

The spider has unusual copulatory organs. The epigyne has two large pockets to the front that are placed very far apart. The copulatory openings lead to wide insemination ducts and smaller receptacles, or spermathecae. The accessory glands are large. The epigyne is shorter and wider than the related Afraflacilla wadis, another genus that had also been previously allocated to the genus Pseudicius. The insemination ducts are also shorter and the accessory glands are different in shape. The male has not been described.

== Distribution and habitat ==
Afraflacilla mushrif is endemic to the United Arab Emirates. The male holotype was found in Mushrif Park in the Emirate of Dubai in 2005. It lives in proximity to the related Afraflacilla fayda. That spider has been observed living amongst the leaves of Prosopis cineraria trees in vegetated dunes.
