= Pseudicius femineus =

Scientific classification
- Kingdom: Animalia
- Phylum: Arthropoda
- Subphylum: Chelicerata
- Class: Arachnida
- Order: Araneae
- Infraorder: Araneomorphae
- Family: Salticidae
- Genus: Pseudicius
- Species: P. femineus

Binomial name
- Pseudicius femineus Wesołowska & Haddad, 2013

Species of spider

Pseudicius femineus is a species of jumping spider in the genus Pseudicius that is endemic to South Africa. The spider was first defined in 2013 by Wanda Wesołowska and Charles Haddad. It has a genus name that is derived from two Greek words meaning false and honest and a species name that is a Latin word for womanly. The spider is small, with a cephalothorax typically 2.1 mm (0.083 in) long and an abdomen typically 3.4 mm (0.13 in) long. The female has a pattern of eight patches on its abdomen. It is most easily distinguished from other species in the genus by its epigyne, which has a deep depression to the rear and has gonopores to the side of a pocket in the middle. Internally, the single chambered spermathecae is reached by short insemination ducts. The male has not been described.

== Taxonomy ==
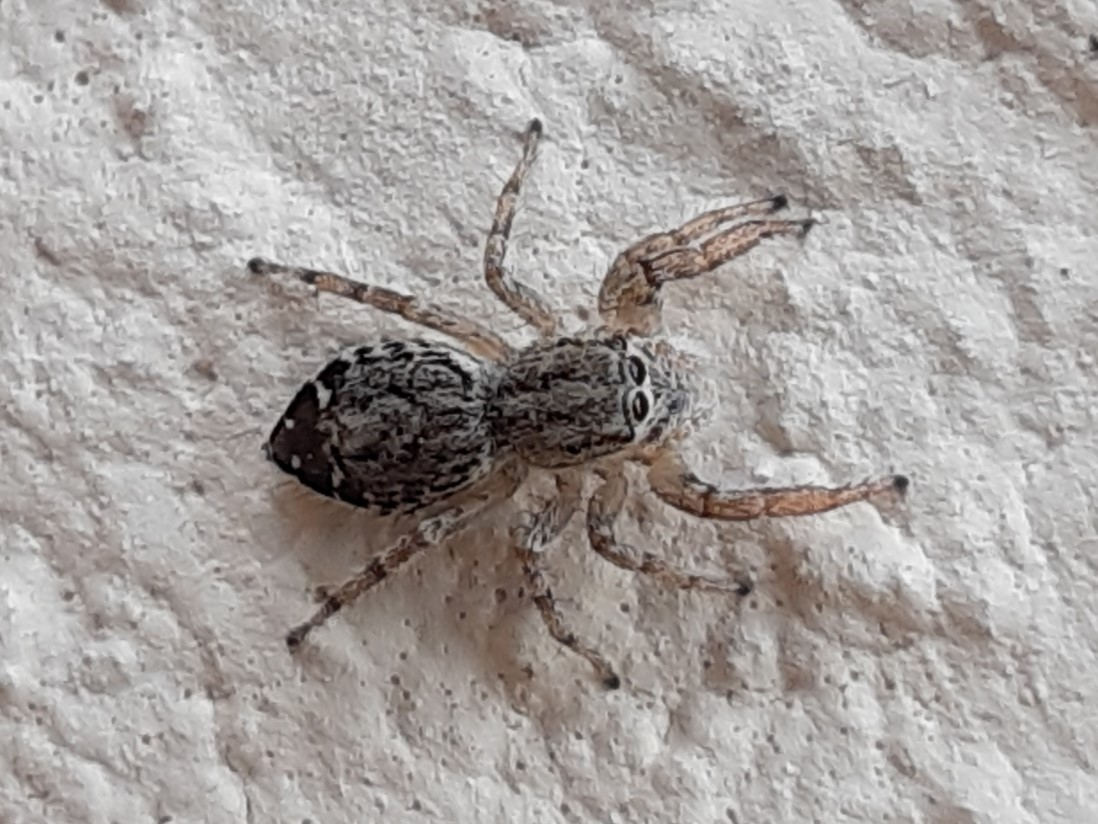
An example of the related species Pseudicius kulczynskii

Pseudicius femineus is a jumping spider that was first described by the Polish arachnologist Wanda Wesołowska and Charles Haddad in 2013. They allocated the species to the genus Pseudicius, first raised by Eugène Simon in 1885. The genus name is related to two Greek words that can be translated false and honest. The genus was provisionally placed alongside Icius that, despite looking superficially similar, has a different etymology. Indeed, Ekaterina Andreeva, Stefania Hęciak and Jerzy Prószyński looked to combine the genera in 1984. The two genera have similar spermathecal structure but work by Wayne Maddison in 1987 demonstrated that they have very different DNA. The two genera were placed in the tribe Heliophaninae alongside Afraflacilla and Marchena. Maddison renamed the tribe Chrysillini in 2015. The tribe is a member of the clade Saltafresia within the subfamily Salticoida. A year later, in 2016, Jerzy Prószyński allocated the genus to the Pseudiciines group of genera, which was named after the genus. Marchena is a member of the group, while Icius is not. They have a flattened and elongated body and characteristic colour patterns. The species is named for a Latin word meaning womenly.

== Description ==
Pseudicius femineus is a small spider. The female has a cephalothorax that is typically 2.1 mm (0.083 in) long and typically 1.6 mm (0.063 in) wide. The carapace is oval, flat and brown with a dense covering of grey hairs. It has a black eye field with long, brown bristles near the eyes. The rearmost end of the carapace has fine white lines. clypeus has white hairs. The sternum and mouthparts are dark brown. The abdomen is typically 3.4 mm (0.13 in) long and typically 2.2 mm (0.087 in) wide. It is elongated and dark grey with a pattern of eight patches in pairs. The underside is pale. The spinnerets are grey and the legs are yellow with dark hairs. The epigyne is very broad with a deep depression to the rear, a deep pocket towards the middle lined with gonopores. The insemination ducts are short leading to single chambered spermathecae. The species is similar to others in the genus and is most easily identified by the shape of the epigyne. For example, it is similar to the related Pseudicius maculatus but the depression is positioned to the rear of the epigyne. The male has not been described.

== Distribution and habitat ==
Pseudicius spiders can be found across Afro-Eurasia and the Eastern hemisphere. Pseudicius femineus is endemic to South Africa. The holotype was found in Lovemore Park in Gqeberha during 2010. It thrives near human habitations. The holotype was found in a suburban garden, hanging from a tree.
