= Pseudicius squamatus =

Scientific classification
- Kingdom: Animalia
- Phylum: Arthropoda
- Subphylum: Chelicerata
- Class: Arachnida
- Order: Araneae
- Infraorder: Araneomorphae
- Family: Salticidae
- Genus: Pseudicius
- Species: P. squamatus

Binomial name
- Pseudicius squamatus Haddad & Wesołowska, 2013

Species of jumping spider

Pseudicius squamatus is a species of jumping spider in the genus Pseudicius that lives in South Africa. The spider was first described in 2013 by Charles R. Haddad and Wanda Wesołowska. The spider is small, with a forward section, or cephalothorax, that is between 1.4 and 1.7 mm (0.055 and 0.067 in) long and, behind that, an abdomen that measures between 1.2 and 1.8 mm (0.047 and 0.071 in) long. It has a dark brown top of its cephalothorax, or carapace, that has three narrow white stripes of hairs running down it and a pattern of a streak that terminates in a series of chevrons on the abdomen. It is the spider's copulatory organs that most enables it to be distinguished from others in the genus. The female has a characteristic triangular depression in its epigyne, the external visible part of its copulatory organs. The male has a series of black scales on the side of the cymbium near to the tip of its embolus. The species is named in recognition of those scales.

== Taxonomy and etymology ==
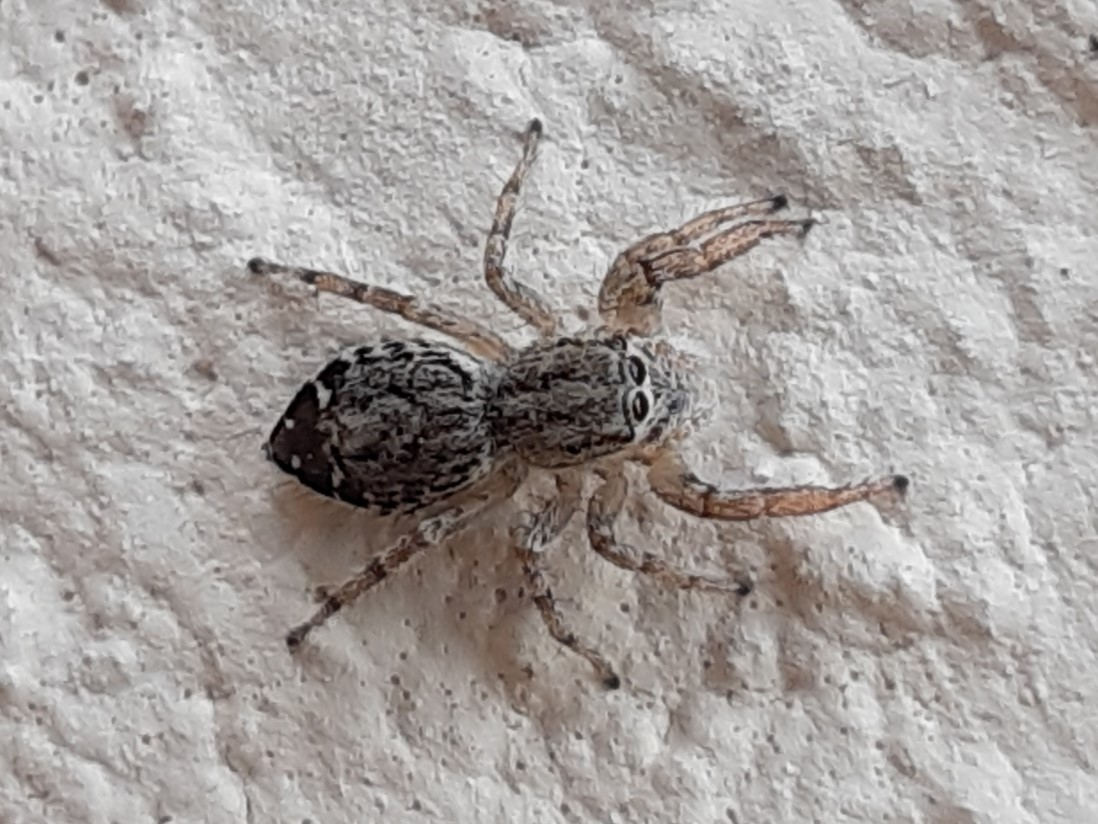
An example of the related species Pseudicius kulczynskii

Pseudicius squamatus is a species of jumping spider, a member of the family Salticidae, that was first described by arachnologists Charles R. Haddad and Wanda Wesołowska in 2013. They allocated the species to the genus Pseudicius, first raised by Eugène Simon in 1885. The genus name is related to two Greek words that can be translated false and honest. The genus was provisionally placed alongside Icius that, despite looking superficially similar, has a different etymology. The two genera were placed in the tribe Heliophaninae alongside Afraflacilla and Marchena. Maddison renamed the tribe Chrysillini in 2015. The tribe is a member of the clade Saltafresia within the subfamily Salticoida. A year later, in 2016, Jerzy Prószyński allocated the genus to the Pseudiciines group of genera, which was named after the genus. Marchena is a member of the group, while Icius is not, as they are now defined as very different genera. The spiders have flattened and elongated body and characteristic colour patterns. The species name is based on a Latin word that refers to the scale-like hairs on the male palpal bulb.

== Description ==
Pseudicius squamatus is a small spider with a slender flattened body. The male has a forward section, or cephalothorax, that is between 1.4 and 1.7 mm (0.055 and 0.067 in) long and 1.0 and 1.2 mm (0.039 and 0.047 in) wide. It has a flat oval, dark brown carapace, the hard upper part of its cephalothorax, with three narrow stripes of white hairs that run from the front to back. It has a black eye field with long brown bristles and a low clypeus with a covering of white hairs. The underside of the cephalothorax, or sternum, is dark brown, as are its mouthparts, including its chelicerae and labium.

The male's abdomen, situated behind its cephalothorax, is between 1.2 and 1.8 mm (0.047 and 0.071 in) long and 1.3 and 1.4 mm (0.051 and 0.055 in) wide. It is dark, brownish-grey and has a pattern of a streak down the middle which divides towards the rear into a series of chevrons, looking not dissimilar to the tributaries of a river delta. The sides are black and the underside grey marked with four lines of white dots. Its spinnerets, used to spin webs, are dark grey. The spider's legs are generally yellow apart from the brown forelegs, which are also stouter than the others.

The spider has distinctive copulatory organs. The spider is most easily identified by the presence of black scales on the side of the cymbium near to the tip of the long whip-like embolus that projects from the top of its palpal bulb. At the base of its cymbium are its pedipalps, sensory organs near its mouth, which are brown and end in a small palpal tibia. Its palpal tibia has a small flat spike, called a tibial apophysis.

The female is similar in size to the male, with a carapace typically measuring 1.5 mm (0.059 in) long and 1.1 mm (0.043 in) wide and an abdomen that is typically 2.2 mm (0.087 in) long and 1.4 mm (0.055 in) wide. It is lighter in colour than the male and has a more distinguishable reddish tinge to the carapace. The carapace is also covered in whitish-grey hairs and there are brown bristles near the eyes. There is also more brown in the colour of the legs. Otherwise, it is very similar. Its copulatory organs help to distinguish the species from others in the genus. Its epigyne, the external visible part of its copulatory organs, is a distinictive shape dominated by a large triangular depression. Internally, the seminal ducts are quite wide and loop round to bean-shaped receptacles, or spermathecae.

== Distribution and habitat ==
Pseudicius spiders can be found across Afro-Eurasia and the Eastern hemisphere. Pseudicius squamatus is endemic to South Africa. The holotype was found in iSimangaliso Wetland Park in KwaZulu-Natal in 2012. Other examples have also been found in the area.
