= Pseudicius matabelensis =

Scientific classification
- Kingdom: Animalia
- Phylum: Arthropoda
- Subphylum: Chelicerata
- Class: Arachnida
- Order: Araneae
- Infraorder: Araneomorphae
- Family: Salticidae
- Genus: Pseudicius
- Species: P. matabelensis

Binomial name
- Pseudicius matabelensis Wesołowska, 2011

Species of spider

Pseudicius matabelensis is a species of jumping spider in the genus Pseudicius that ilves in Namibia, South Africa and Zimbabwe. The spider was first defined in 2011 by Wanda Wesołowska. The spider is small, with a cephalothorax between 1.6 and 1.9 mm (0.063 and 0.075 in) long and an abdomen between 1.7 and 2.3 mm (0.067 and 0.091 in) long. It has a dark brown carapace and olive-brownish abdomen, the latter with an indistinct pattern of two stripes. The male has stout dark brown front legs. The species is similar to the related Pseudicius procerus but differs in its copulatory organs. The female has two pockets at the front of the epigyne and short seminal ducts leading to large receptacles. The male has a very long tibial apophysis and short embolus.

== Taxonomy ==
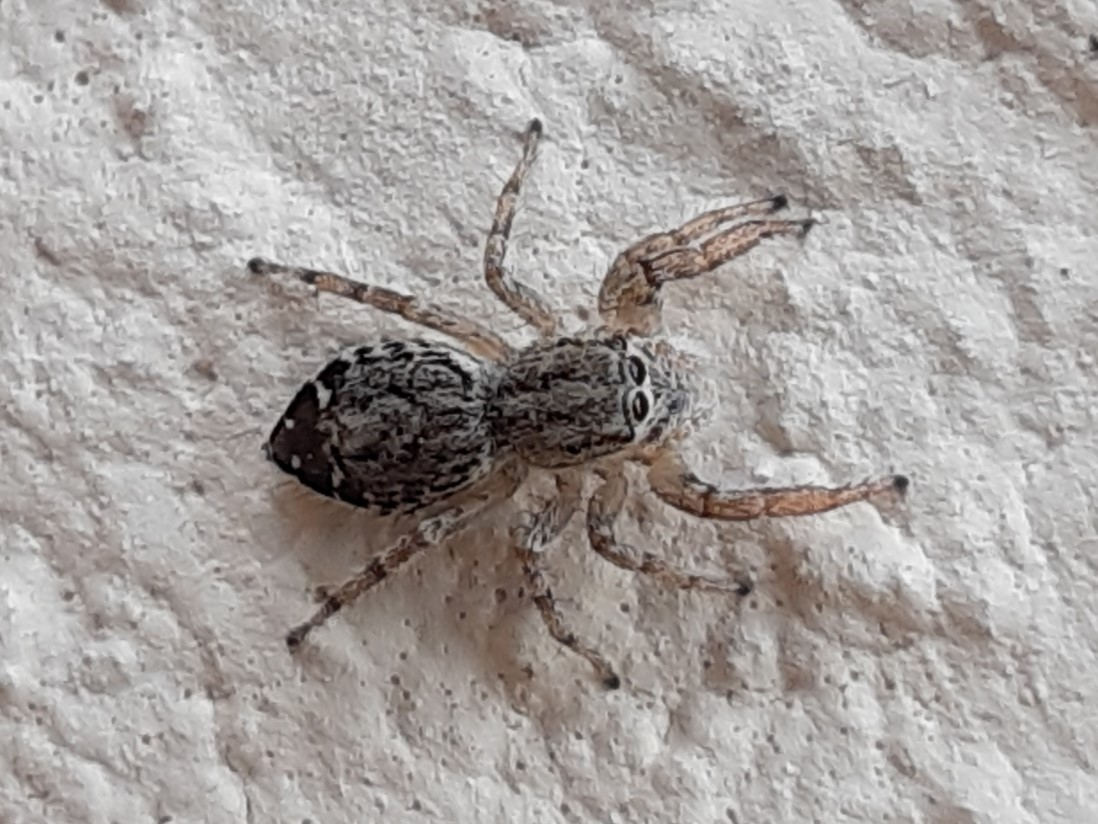
An example of the related species Pseudicius kulczynskii

Pseudicius matabelensis is a jumping spider that was first described by the Polish arachnologist Wanda Wesołowska in 2011. It was one of more than 500 species that she identified in her career, making her one of the most prolific in the discipline. She allocated the species to the genus Pseudicius, first raised by Eugène Simon in 1885. The genus name is related to two Greek words that can be translated false and honest. The genus was provisionally placed alongside Icius that, despite looking superficially similar, has a different etymology. Indeed, Ekaterina Andreeva, Stefania Hęciak and Jerzy Prószyński looked to combine the genera in 1984. The two genera have similar spermathecal structure but work by Wayne Maddison in 1987 demonstrated that they have very different DNA. The two genera were placed in the tribe Heliophaninae alongside Afraflacilla and Marchena.The tribe is ubiquitous across most continents of the world. Maddison renamed the tribe Chrysillini in 2015. The tribe is a member of the clade Saltafresia within the subfamily Salticoida. A year later, in 2016, Jerzy Prószyński allocated the genus to the Pseudiciines group of genera, which was named after the genus. Marchena is a member of the group, while Icius is not. They have flattened and elongated body and a characteristic colour pattern. The species is named for Matabeleland, the area of Zimbabwe were the species was first identified.

== Description ==
Pseudicius matabelensis is a small spider. The male has a cephalothorax that is between 1.6 and 1.9 mm (0.063 and 0.075 in) long and between 1.1 and 1.3 mm (0.043 and 0.051 in) wide. The carapace is oval, flat and dark brown with a covering of delicate colourless hairs. It has a black eye field with long thin bristles around the eyes themselves. The chelicerae are large and unidentate. The spider has a brown labium and sternum. The elongated abdomen is between 1.7 and 2.3 mm (0.067 and 0.091 in) long and between 1.0 and 1.3 mm (0.039 and 0.051 in) wide. It is olive-brownish with the indistinct impression of two stripes on its topside and a dark brown underside. The spinnerets and foremost legs are also dark brown. The remaining legs are light brown. The forelegs are also very stout. The pedipalps are brown. There is a single very long tibial apophysis.

The female is similar to the male. The carapace is approximately the same size, measuring typically 1.7 mm (0.067 in) long and 1.2 mm (0.047 in) wide. There are distinctive white hairs on the clypeus. The abdomen is typically 2.0 mm (0.079 in) long and 1.3 mm (0.051 in) wide. The foreleg is not as stout as the male, and more similar to the remaining legs. Other features are similar to the male. The spider has an elongated epigyne with a large deep central depression and two pockets placed to the fore. The internal structure of the copulatory organs is complex, with short and narrow seminal ducts leading to very large, wide and heavily sclerotized receptacles.

The species is similar to Pseudicius procerus. The male can be distinguished by the shorter embolus and more elongated palpal bulb. The female has shorter and narrower seminal ducts and the pockets on the epigyne are positioned more to the front. Otherwise, the species can be distinguished from other species in the genus by its very long tibial apophysis.

== Behaviour ==
Pseudicius matabelensis is typical for the genus. Like many jumping spiders, it is not likely to spin webs to capture prey. Instead, it is mainly a diurnal hunter that uses its good eyesight to spot its prey. The species has a particular fondness for mud daubers. Pseudicius spiders use visual displays during courtship and transmit vibratory signals through silk to communicate to other spiders.

== Distribution and habitat ==
Pseudicius spiders can be found across Afro-Eurasia and the Eastern hemisphere. Pseudicius matabelensis is found in Namibia, South Africa and Zimbabwe. The holotype was found near Tsholotsho in Zimbabwe during 2007. Other examples has also been discovered in the Malilangwe Wildlife Reserve in 1974. The species was identified in Namibia based on male and female examples found near Lüderitz in 1990 and Maltahöhe in 1992. The first example to be found in South Africa was collected in 2014 in the Ndumo Game Reserve in KwaZulu-Natal. It was living in the canopy of Senegalia nigrescens trees. The species is a tree-dweller.
