= Athleta gilchristi =

Scientific classification
- Kingdom: Animalia
- Phylum: Mollusca
- Class: Gastropoda
- Subclass: Caenogastropoda
- Order: Neogastropoda
- Family: Volutidae
- Genus: Athleta
- Species: A. gilchristi

Binomial name
- Athleta gilchristi (Sowerby III, 1902)

Synonyms
- Athleta (Athleta) gilchristi (G.B. Sowerby III, 1902); Volutilithes gilchristi G.B. Sowerby III, 1902 (basionym)

Species of gastropod

Athleta gilchristi is a species of sea snail, a marine gastropod mollusk in the family Volutidae, the volutes.

== Distribution ==
Deepwater (300 metres) offshore Durban, South Africa.
