= Athleta epigona =

Scientific classification
- Kingdom: Animalia
- Phylum: Mollusca
- Class: Gastropoda
- Subclass: Caenogastropoda
- Order: Neogastropoda
- Family: Volutidae
- Genus: Athleta
- Species: A. epigona

Binomial name
- Athleta epigona (Martens, 1904)

Species of gastropod

Athleta (Athleta) epigona is a species of sea snail, a marine gastropod mollusk in the family Volutidae, the volutes.

== Distribution ==
This species occurs in the Indian Ocean off Tanzania and Zanzibar.
