= Nandicius =

Scientific classification
- Kingdom: Animalia
- Phylum: Arthropoda
- Subphylum: Chelicerata
- Class: Arachnida
- Order: Araneae
- Infraorder: Araneomorphae
- Family: Salticidae
- Subfamily: Salticinae
- Genus: Nandicius; Prószyński, 2016

Type species
- Nandicius mussooriensis

Species
- 7, see text

Genus of spiders

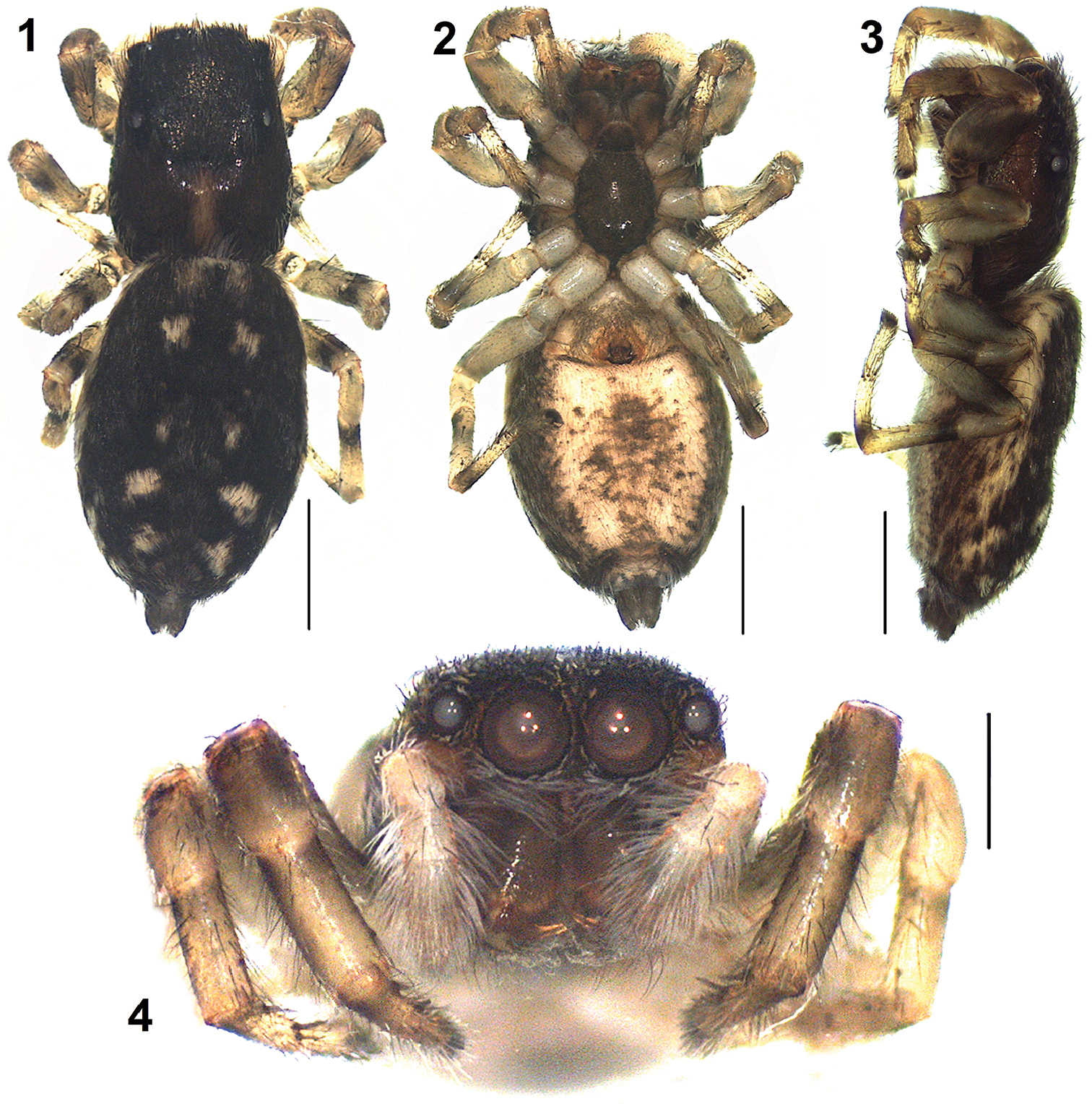
Nandicus vallisflorum

Nandicius is a genus of spiders in the family Salticidae. It was first described in 2016 by Jerzy Prószyński. As of 2017, it contains 7 Asian species.

== Taxonomy ==
The genus Nandicius was one of a number of new genera erected by Jerzy Prószyński in 2016, largely for species formerly placed in Pseudicius. Prószyński placed Nandicius in his informal group "chrysillines". In Wayne Maddison's 2015 classification of the family Salticidae, the tribe Chrysillini is part of the Salticoida clade of the subfamily Salticinae.

=== Species ===
Nandicius comprises the following species:

- Nandicius cambridgei (Prószyński & Zochowska, 1981) – Central Asia, China
- Nandicius deletus (O. Pickard-Cambridge, 1885) – China
- Nandicius frigidus (O. Pickard-Cambridge, 1885) – Afghanistan, Pakistan, India, China
- Nandicius kimjoopili (Kim, 1995) – Korea, Japan
- Nandicius mussooriensis (Prószyński, 1992) – India
- Nandicius pseudoicioides (Caporiacco, 1935) – Himalayas
- Nandicius szechuanensis (Logunov, 1995) – China
