= Athleta insperata =

Scientific classification
- Kingdom: Animalia
- Phylum: Mollusca
- Class: Gastropoda
- Subclass: Caenogastropoda
- Order: Neogastropoda
- Family: Volutidae
- Genus: Athleta
- Species: A. insperata

Binomial name
- Athleta insperata Darragh, 1979

Species of gastropod

Athleta (Ternivoluta) insperata is a species of sea snail, a marine gastropod mollusk in the family Volutidae, the volutes.

== Distribution ==
This marine species occurs off Eastern Australia.
