= Pseudicius mirus =

Scientific classification
- Kingdom: Animalia
- Phylum: Arthropoda
- Subphylum: Chelicerata
- Class: Arachnida
- Order: Araneae
- Infraorder: Araneomorphae
- Family: Salticidae
- Genus: Pseudicius
- Species: P. mirus

Binomial name
- Pseudicius mirus Wesołowska & van Harten, 2002

Species of spider

Pseudicius mirus is a species of jumping spider in the genus Pseudicius that is endemic to South Africa. The spider was first defined in 2013 by Wanda Wesołowska and Antonius van Harten. It has a genus name that is derived from two Greek words meaning false and honest and a species name that is a Latin word curious. The spider is small, with a brown carapace typically 2.2 mm (0.087 in) long and a greyish-yellow abdomen typically 2.3 mm (0.091 in) long. It has a wide brown band that stretches down the middle of the abdomen and yellow legs. The male has a distinctive hook-like spike on one of this tibial apophyses.The female has not been described.

== Taxonomy ==
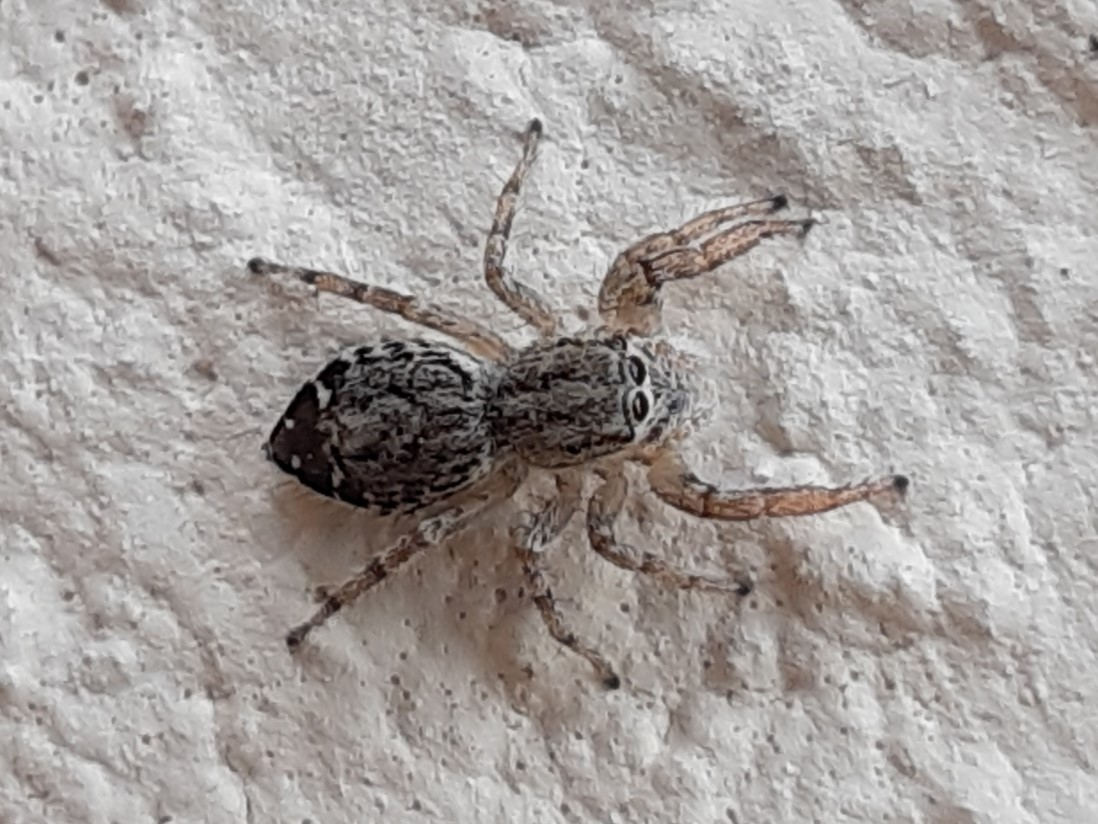
An example of the related species Pseudicius kulczynskii

Pseudicius mirus is a jumping spider that was first described by Wanda Wesołowska and Antonius van Harten in 2002. They allocated the species to the genus Pseudicius, first raised by Eugène Simon in 1885. The genus name is related to two Greek words that can be translated false and honest. The genus was provisionally placed alongside Icius that, despite looking superficially similar, has a different etymology. Indeed, Ekaterina Andreeva, Stefania Hęciak and Jerzy Prószyński looked to combine the genera in 1984. The two genera have similar spermathecal structure but work by Wayne Maddison in 1987 demonstrated that they have very different DNA. The two genera were placed in the tribe Heliophaninae alongside Afraflacilla and Marchena. The tribe is ubiquitous across most continents of the world. Maddison renamed the tribe Chrysillini in 2015. The tribe is a member of the clade Saltafresia within the subfamily Salticoida. A year later, in 2016, Jerzy Prószyński allocated the genus to the Pseudiciines group of genera, which was named after the genus. The spiders have a flattened and elongated body and characteristic patterns on their abdomen. The species is named for a Latin word meaning curious.

== Description ==
Pseudicius mirus is a small spider, typical of the genus. The male has a carapace that is typically 2.2 mm (0.087 in) long and 1.6 mm (0.063 in) wide. It is oval, widest towards the middle with a flattened forward part, and covered in dense short white hairs. It has a long, brown bristles near its eyes. The spider has a clypeus that is low and brown. The chelicerae are brown with one tooth visible to the front and two to the back. The labium is light brown and the sternum is yellow. The spider's abdomen is typically 2.3 mm (0.091 in) long and 1.4 mm (0.055 in) wide. It is oval like the carapace, but greyish-yellow with a wide brown band stretching across its middle. It has light hairs along the sides and brown bristles along the underside, which is light. The spinnerets are yellowish-grey and the legs are yellow. The foremost legs are longer and thicker than the others, and are marked with a brown stripe. All the legs are covered with long light hairs. Dense white hairs cover much of the copulatory organs, which are unusual and so help distinguish the species from others in the genus. The pedipalps are very dark brown, nearly black. The palpal bulb is oval with a narrow triangular lobe to the base. The embolus is short and blunt.There are two tibial apophyses, one with a small hook jutting out from it, the other more blunt. It is this small hook-like spike that most differentiates the species from others in the genus. The female has not been described.

== Distribution ==
Pseudicius spiders can be found across Afro-Eurasia and the Eastern hemisphere. Pseudicius mirus is endemic to Yemen. The species has limited distribution. The holotype was found on Socotra Island during 1999. Examples have not been found in any other areas of the country.
