= Pseudicius africanus =

Scientific classification
- Kingdom: Animalia
- Phylum: Arthropoda
- Subphylum: Chelicerata
- Class: Arachnida
- Order: Araneae
- Infraorder: Araneomorphae
- Family: Salticidae
- Genus: Pseudicius
- Species: P. africanus

Binomial name
- Pseudicius africanus G. W. Peckham & E. G. Peckham, 1903

Species of spider

Pseudicius africanus is a species of jumping spider in the genus Pseudicius that lives in Lesotho and South Africa. The spider was first defined in 1903 by George and Elizabeth Peckham. It is small, with an oval cephalothorax measuring between 2 and 2.5 mm (0.08 and 0.10 in) in length and an ovoid abdomen that is between 2.2 and 2.5 mm (0.09 and 0.10 in) in length. The female is smaller than the male. Otherwise, they are similar, generally dark brown but with white stripes, made of hairs, down the middle and the along the sides of the top of both the carapace and abdomen. The underside of the abdomen differs in being grey and marked by two lighter lines. The female's legs are also lighter, and the front legs on the male are stouter than all the others. The pattern on the abdomen helps distinguish the spider from the related Pseudicius maculatus. It also has distinctive copulatory organs. The male has a shorter curved embolus and a characteristic tooth near the base of the tibial apophysis, or spike on the palpal tibia. The female has copulatory openings are on the edges of its epigyne.

== Taxonomy ==
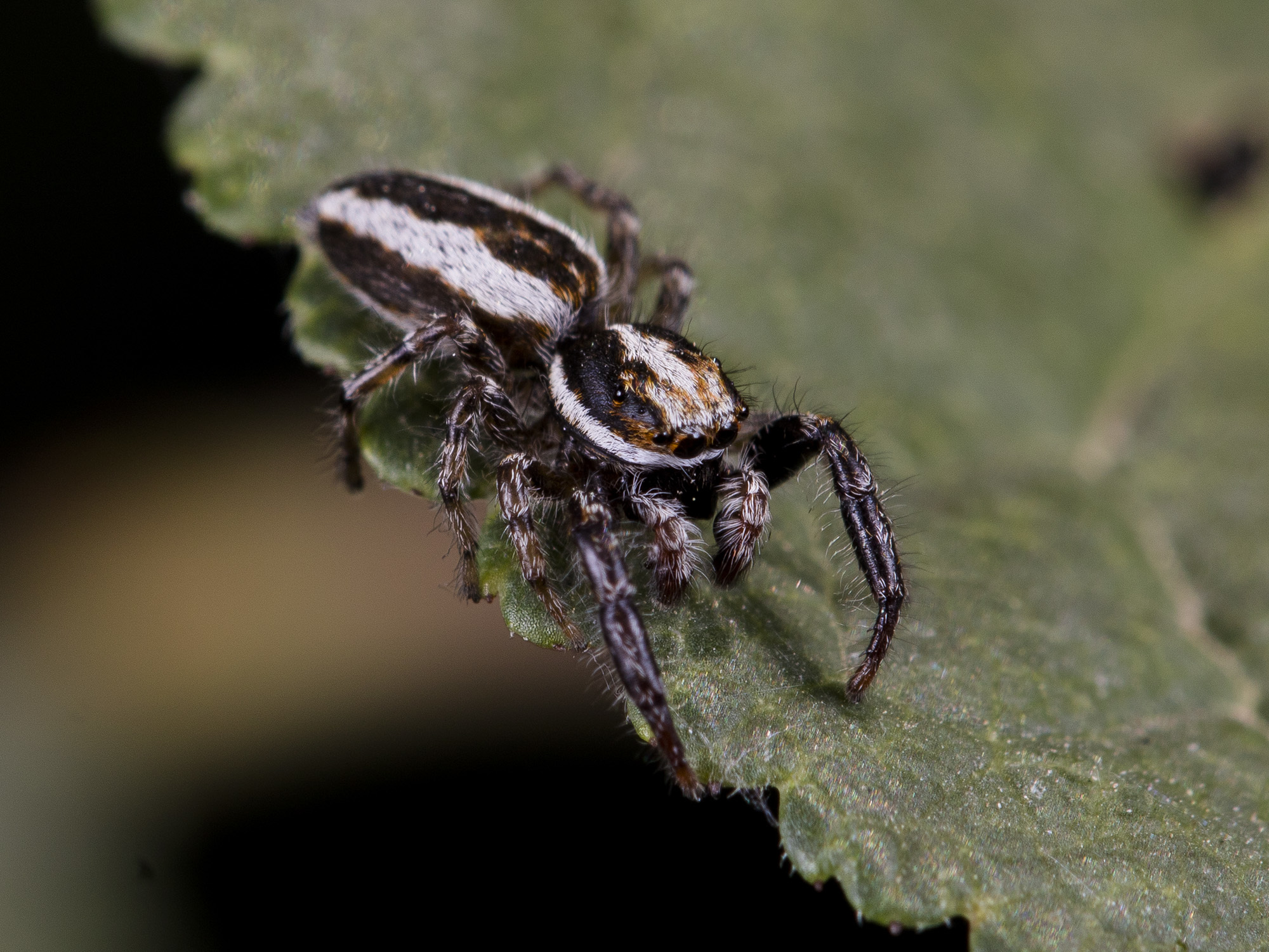
An example of the related species Pseudicius encarpatus

Pseudicius africanus is a jumping spider that was first described by George and Elizabeth Peckham in 1903. They allocated the species to the genus Pseudicius, first circumscribed by Eugène Simon in 1885. The genus name is related to two Greek words that can be translated false and honest. It was provisionally placed alongside the genus Icius. As they are superficially similar, Ekaterina Andreeva, Stefania Hęciak and Jerzy Prószyński looked to combine the genera in 1984. The two genera have similar spermathecal structure but work by Wayne Maddison in 1987 demonstrated that they have very different DNA. Also, despite the names looking similar, they have different etymologies. They were kept separate, but recognised as related. The two genera were placed in the tribe Heliophaninae alongside Afraflacilla and Marchena. The tribe is ubiquitous across most continents of the world. Maddison renamed the tribe Chrysillini in 2015. The tribe is a member of the clade Saltafresia within the subfamily Salticoida. A year later, in 2016, Jerzy Prószyński allocated the genus to the Pseudiciines group of genera, which was named after the genus. They have a flattened and elongated body and characteristic colour patterns.

== Description ==
Pseudicius africanus is a small spider. The spider's slender, flattened body is divided into two main parts: the cephalothorax and the abdomen. The male is larger than the female. It has a cephalothorax that is typically 2.5 mm (0.10 in) long and 1.5 mm (0.06 in). The carapace, the hard upper part of the cephalothorax, and the sternum, or underside, are both dark brown oval. The spider's eye field is darker, with brown bristles near the eyes and black rings encircling the eyes themselves. White hairs form stripes that mark the edges of the carapace and a thin band that stretches from the front of the eyes all the way to the back. The spider's face, known as the clypeus, is adorned with short white hairs. The mouthparts, consisting of chelicerae, labium and maxilae, are also dark brown.

The abdomen, which is typically 2.5 mm (0.10 in) long and 1.8 mm (0.07 in) wide, is a slightly elongated ovoid that is similarly dark brown with a white stripe down the middle and others along the edges. These stretch all the way to the spinnerets. The foremost spinnerets are darker than the rearmost. The underside of the abdomen is a contrasting grey with two pale lines visible. The spider's legs are brown, with brown leg hairs and spines. The front legs are darker and stouter than the others. The spider has stridulatory apparatus which it rubs to make sounds. The pedipalps, sensory organs near the mouth are brown. The spider has distinctive copulatory organs. The palpal tibia has a wide scoop-like spike, called the tibial apophysis, which has a characteristic additional tooth towards its root. The palpal bulb has a large lobe at its base and an embolus that curves into the cymbium that surrounds palpal bulb.

The female is smaller than the male, with a cephalothorax that is typically 2 mm (0.08 in) long and an abdomen 2.2 mm (0.09 in) long, both being typically 1.3 mm (0.05 in) wide. Apart from that, it is roughly the same shape to the male with a similar pattern on its surfaces. The legs are different, being lighter. The front legs are also less stout and similar to the others. Some examples have yellow legs. The epigyne is typical for the genus, but has is marked by a large depression in the middle. The copulatory openings are on the edges and lead to wide winding insemination ducts and large spermathecae.

The species is similar to Pseudicius maculatus, but can be recognised by its abdominal pattern. The male has a slightly shorter embolus and the tooth on the tibial apophysis. The female can be distinguished by the position of its copulatory openings, which are on the edge of the depression rather than the back.

== Distribution and habitat ==
Pseudicius spiders can be found across Afro-Eurasia and the Eastern hemisphere. Pseudicius africanus is found in Lesotho and South Africa. The female holotype was found in the Cape Colony, which is likely to be near Cape Town. Other examples, both female and male, have been identified in the De Hoop Nature Reserve in Western Cape in 2004. Meanwhile, the first examples seen in Lesotho had been found near the Mohale Dam in Maseru District in 2003. Other specimen were also collected in the same year near to the village of Ha Liphapang in Quthing District. It is now known to live in both central and southern Lesotho. The spider is foliage-dwelling and thrives in shrubs in fynbos, particularly in forests of Eucalyptus trees. It has also been found on rocks near to rivers.
