= Athleta boswellae =

Scientific classification
- Kingdom: Animalia
- Phylum: Mollusca
- Class: Gastropoda
- Subclass: Caenogastropoda
- Order: Neogastropoda
- Family: Volutidae
- Genus: Athleta
- Species: A. boswellae

Binomial name
- Athleta boswellae (Rehder, 1969)

Synonyms
- Athleta magister (Kilburn, 1978); Athleta (Athleta) boswellae (Rehder, 1969); Volutocorbis boswellae Rehder, 1969 (basionym)

Species of gastropod

Athleta boswellae is a species of sea snail, a marine gastropod mollusk in the family Volutidae, the volutes.
