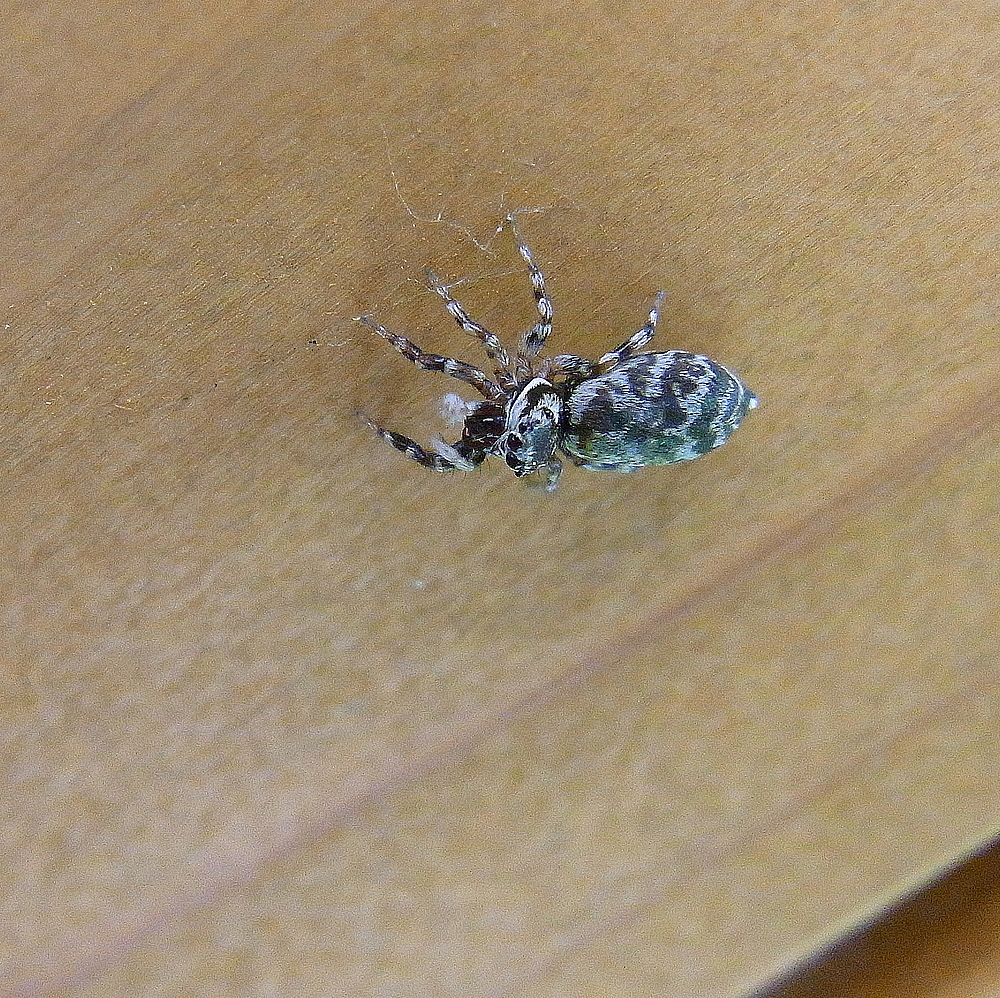
- Orienticius vulpes

Scientific classification
- Kingdom: Animalia
- Phylum: Arthropoda
- Subphylum: Chelicerata
- Class: Arachnida
- Order: Araneae
- Infraorder: Araneomorphae
- Family: Salticidae
- Subfamily: Salticinae
- Genus: Orienticius; Prószyński, 2016

Type species
- Orienticius vulpes

Species
- Orienticius chinensis (Logunov, 1995); Orienticius vulpes (Grube, 1861)

= Orienticius =

Genus of spiders

Orienticius is a genus of spiders in the family Salticidae. It was first described in 2016 by Prószyński. As of 2017, it contains 2 species.

== Taxonomy ==
The genus Orienticius was one of a number of new genera erected by Jerzy Prószyński in 2016, largely for species formerly placed in Pseudicius. In Wayne Maddison's 2015 classification of the family Salticidae, Pseudicius, broadly circumscribed, is part of the Salticoida clade of the subfamily Salticinae.
