= Pseudicius ridicularis =

Scientific classification
- Kingdom: Animalia
- Phylum: Arthropoda
- Subphylum: Chelicerata
- Class: Arachnida
- Order: Araneae
- Infraorder: Araneomorphae
- Family: Salticidae
- Genus: Pseudicius
- Species: P. ridicularis

Binomial name
- Pseudicius ridicularis Wesołowska & Tomasiewicz, 2008

Species of spider

Pseudicius ridicularis is a species of jumping spider in the genus Pseudicius that lives in Ethiopia. The spider was first described in 2008 by Wanda Wesołowska and Beata Tomasiewicz. The spider is medium-sized, with a cephalothorax that is between 2.1 and 2.2 mm (0.083 and 0.087 in) long and an abdomen that measures between 2.6 and 3.1 mm (0.10 and 0.12 in) long. It has a dark brownish carapace, while the abdomen differs between the male, which has a yellowish-brown hue, and the female, which is marked by an indistinctive pattern of brown patches. It is the copulatory organs that most enable the spider to be distinguished. The male has a particularly large bent tibial apophysis and a short thick embolus. The female has longer spermathecae than others in the genus.

== Taxonomy ==
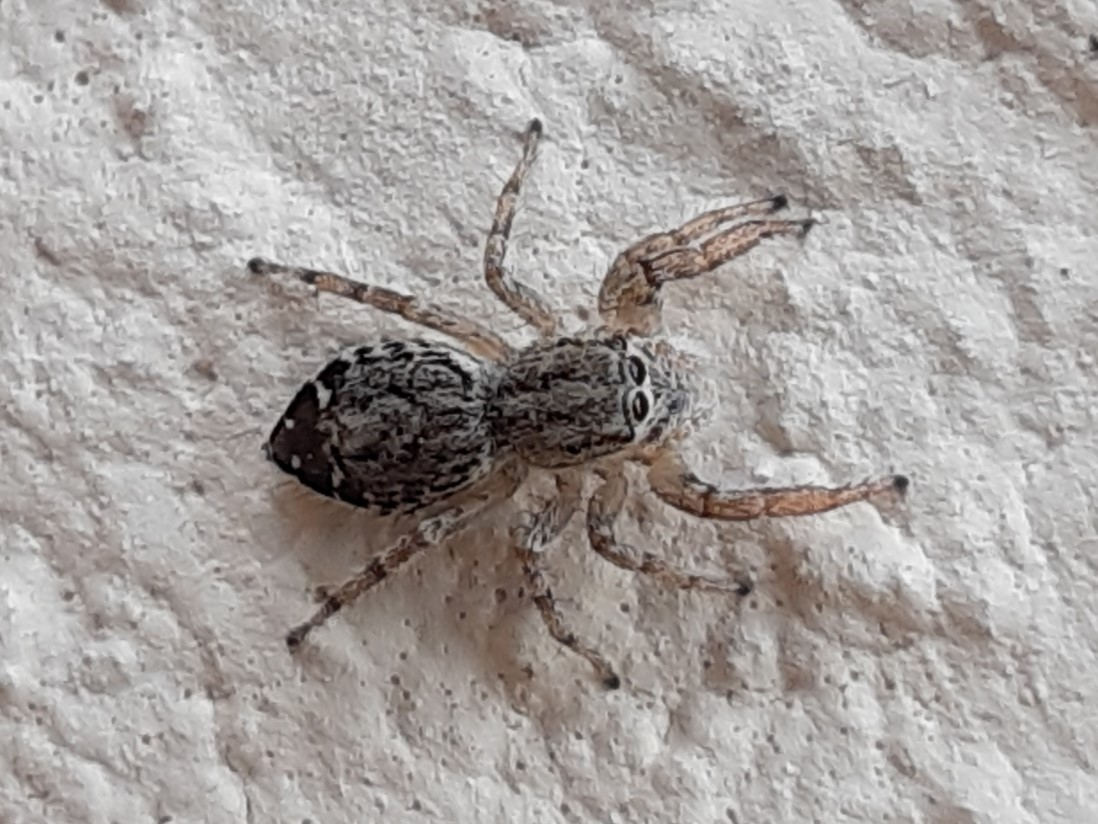
An example of the related species Pseudicius kulczynskii

Pseudicius ridicularis is a jumping spider that was first described by Wanda Wesołowska and Beata Tomasiewicz in 2008. They allocated the species to the genus Pseudicius, first raised by Eugène Simon in 1885. The genus name is related to two Greek words that can be translated false and honest. The genus was provisionally placed alongside Icius that, despite looking superficially similar, has a different etymology. The two genera were placed in the tribe Heliophaninae alongside Afraflacilla and Marchena. Maddison renamed the tribe Chrysillini in 2015. The tribe is a member of the clade Saltafresia within the subfamily Salticoida. A year later, in 2016, Jerzy Prószyński allocated the genus to the Pseudiciines group of genera, which was named after the genus. The spiders have flattened and elongated body and characteristic colour patterns. The species name is based on a Latin word that refers the unusual "grotesque" shape of the appendage on the palpal tibia.

== Description ==
Pseudicius ridicularis is a medium-sized spider. The female has a cephalothorax that is between 2.1 and 2.2 mm (0.083 and 0.087 in) long and typically 1.5 mm (0.059 in) wide. It has a flat oval, dark brownish carapace covered in short greyish hairs, with two large white spots over the eye field and light stripes of white hairs on the edges. The chelicerae are brown, with one tooth at the front and two to the rear. The labium are also brown. The sternum is oval and brownish. The abdomen is between 2.6 and 3.1 mm (0.10 and 0.12 in) long and 1.4 and 1.9 mm (0.055 and 0.075 in) wide. It is elongated and light, with an indistinct pattern of brown patches in the middle and a light band to the front. The spinnerets are greyish with long hairs. The legs are light yellow, except for the front legs, which are more brown and longer. The front legs also have longer hairs. The spider has bristles that it uses to stridulate. The epigyne has two rounded centrally located copulatory openings and a wide pocket in the epigastric furrow. There are small accessory glands that lead to insemination ducts and strongly sclerotised elongated spermathecae.

The male is similar to the female with a carapace typically measuring 2.2 mm (0.087 in) long and 1.5 mm (0.059 in) wide and an abdomen that is typically 2.6 mm (0.10 in) long and 1.4 mm (0.055 in) wide. The yellowish-brown abdomen is covered in short delicate colourless hairs. The spinnerets are yellowish-grey. The spider has similar stridulatory bristles. The pedipalps are yellowish with two long spines. The spider has a very large tibial apophysis that has a distinctive bend to the tip and a short thick embolus. The spider is most easily distinguished by its copulatory organs. The male has a particularly large and bent tibial apophysis and the female longer receptacles than others in the genus.

== Distribution and habitat ==
Pseudicius spiders can be found across Afro-Eurasia and the Eastern hemisphere. Pseudicius ridicularis is endemic to Ethiopia. The holotype was found in Bishoftu during 1988. Other examples have also been identified in the area. The spider is tree-dwelling. It is particularly found on trunks of Ficus sycomorus.
