= Athleta kilburni =

Scientific classification
- Kingdom: Animalia
- Phylum: Mollusca
- Class: Gastropoda
- Subclass: Caenogastropoda
- Order: Neogastropoda
- Family: Volutidae
- Genus: Athleta
- Species: A. kilburni

Binomial name
- Athleta kilburni (Rehder, 1974)

Synonyms
- Athleta (Athleta) kilburni (Rehder, 1974); Volutocorbis kilburni Rehder, 1974 (basionym)

Species of gastropod

Athleta kilburni is a species of sea snail, a marine gastropod mollusk in the family Volutidae, the volutes.

== Description ==
This species attains a size of 40 mm.

== Distribution ==
South Africa.
