= Pseudicius flabellus =

Scientific classification
- Kingdom: Animalia
- Phylum: Arthropoda
- Subphylum: Chelicerata
- Class: Arachnida
- Order: Araneae
- Infraorder: Araneomorphae
- Family: Salticidae
- Genus: Pseudicius
- Species: P. flabellus

Binomial name
- Pseudicius flabellus Wesołowska & Haddad, 2013

Species of spider

Pseudicius flabellus is a species of jumping spider in the genus Pseudicius that is endemic to South Africa. The spider was first defined in 2013 by Wanda Wesołowska and Charles Haddad. It has a genus name that is derived from two Greek words meaning false and honest and a species name that is a Latin word for fan that recalls the shape of the male's palpal tibial apophysis. The spider is small, with a cephalothorax typically 2.0 mm (0.08 in) long and an abdomen typically 2.3 mm (0.09 in) long. It is generally brown in colour, with an indistinct lighter streak down the middle, and greyish-yellow legs. It is similar to the related Pseudicius dentatus, differing in the shape of its copulatory organs. The male has a distinctive fan-like tibial apophysis and an embolus that has a broad base and narrow tip.The female has not been described.

== Taxonomy ==
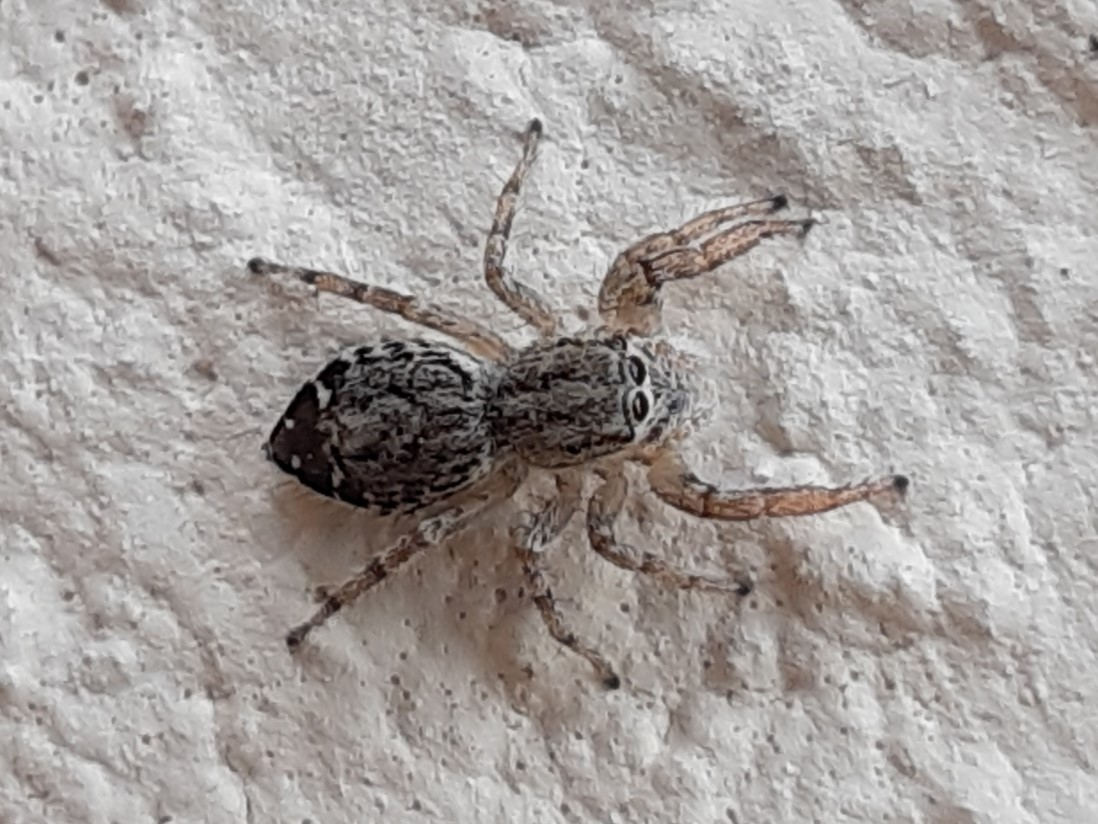
An example of the related species Pseudicius kulczynskii

Pseudicius flabellus is a jumping spider that was first described by Wanda Wesołowska and Charles Haddad in 2013. They allocated the species to the genus Pseudicius, first circumscribed by Eugène Simon in 1885. The genus name is related to two Greek words that can be translated false and honest. The genus was provisionally placed alongside Icius. As they are superficially similar, Ekaterina Andreeva, Stefania Hęciak and Jerzy Prószyński looked to combine the genera in 1984. The two genera have similar spermathecal structure but work by Wayne Maddison in 1987 demonstrated that they have very different DNA. Also, despite the names looking similar, they have different etymologies. They were kept separate, but recognised as related. The two genera were placed in the tribe Heliophaninae alongside Afraflacilla and Marchena. The tribe is ubiquitous across most continents of the world. Maddison renamed the tribe Chrysillini in 2015. The tribe is a member of the clade Saltafresia within the subfamily Salticoida. A year later, in 2016, Jerzy Prószyński allocated the genus to the Pseudiciines group of genera, which was named after the genus. Marchena is a member of the group, while Icius is not. They have flattened and elongated body and a characteristic colour pattern. The species is named for a Latin word meaning fan.

== Description ==
Pseudicius flabellus is a small spider with a shape typical for the genus. The spider's body is divided into two main parts: the cephalothorax and the abdomen. The male has a cephalothorax that is typically 2.0 mm (0.08 in) long and 1.4 mm (0.06 in) wide. The carapace, the hard upper part of the cephalothorax, is elongated, flat and brown with a covering of colourless hairs. It has a black eye field with a scattering of white hairs and long, brown bristles near the eyes. There is an indistinct paler streak visible on the top. The underside of the cephalothorax, or sternum, is brown. The spider's face, or clypeus, has white hairs. The mouthparts, including the chelicerae and labium, are brown. The abdomen is typically 2.3 mm (0.09 in) long and 1.4 mm (0.06 in) wide. It is elongated, brown with whites stripes on the sides and covered in colourless hairs, similar to the carapace. There is also an indistinct paler belt in the middle. The underside is dark. The spinnerets are brownish and the legs are greyish-yellow. The female has not been described.

The species is similar to others in the genus and is most easily identified by its copulatory organs. For example, it is similar to the related Pseudicius dentatus but it lacks the outgrowth towards the middle of the cymbium of the other species. The embolus is unusual. It attaches prolaterally to the palpal bulb and has a distinctive shape, being broad at its base with a much smaller tip. The species also has a unique tibial apophysis, or appendage, that is reminiscent of a fan, with a blunt end and the majority of the surface dotted with small tooth-like features. The shape of the apophysis is the reason for that the species is named "flabellus".

== Distribution and habitat ==
Pseudicius spiders can be found across Afro-Eurasia and the Eastern hemisphere. Pseudicius flabellus is endemic to South Africa. The holotype was found in Malmesbury, Rondeberg in Western Cape during 1987. The spider lives in the fynbos ecoregion.
