= Athleta glabrata =

Scientific classification
- Kingdom: Animalia
- Phylum: Mollusca
- Class: Gastropoda
- Subclass: Caenogastropoda
- Order: Neogastropoda
- Family: Volutidae
- Genus: Athleta
- Species: A. glabrata

Binomial name
- Athleta glabrata (Kilburn, 1971)

Synonyms
- Athleta (Athleta) glabrata (Kilburn, 1971); Volutocorbis glabrata Kilburn, 1971 (basionym)

Species of gastropod

Athleta glabrata is a species of sea snail, a marine gastropod mollusk in the family Volutidae, the volutes.
