= Pseudicius wesolowskae =

Scientific classification
- Kingdom: Animalia
- Phylum: Arthropoda
- Subphylum: Chelicerata
- Class: Arachnida
- Order: Araneae
- Infraorder: Araneomorphae
- Family: Salticidae
- Genus: Pseudicius
- Species: P. wesolowskae

Binomial name
- Pseudicius wesolowskae Zhu & Song, 2001

Species of spider

Pseudicius wesolowskae is a species of jumping spider in the genus Pseudicius that lives in Hebei, China. The spider was first described in 2001 by Mingsheng Zhu and Daxiang Song. The spider is small, with a body length that is between 3.43 and 3.78 mm (0.135 and 0.149 in). The male is larger than the female. The spider has a light brown carapace with a black eye field. The abdomen is a dark brown on the top, marked by a pattern of white spots, and grey-yellow underneath, with a pattern of yellow-white spots. The copulatory organs enable the species to be distinguished from others in the genus. The male has a long embolus and unusual tibial apophyses. The female has a cross-shaped marking towards the rear of its epigyne. The species is named after the Polish arachnologist Wanda Wesołowska.

== Taxonomy ==
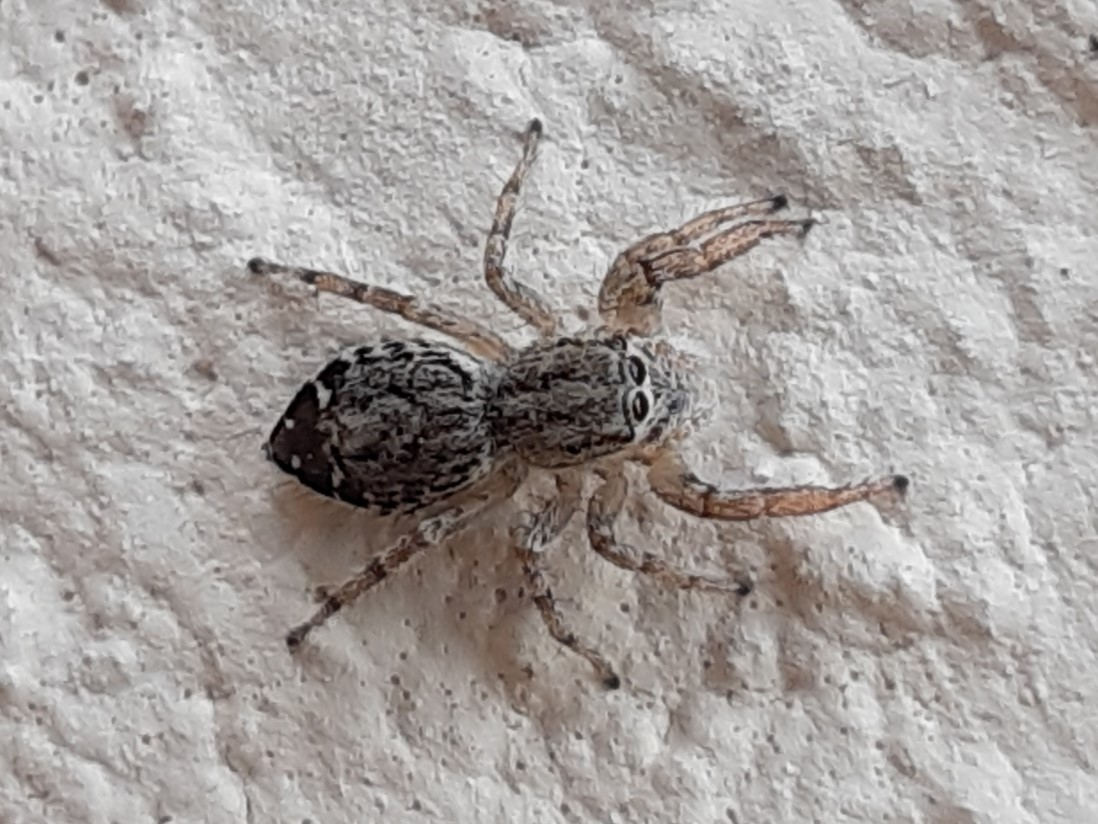
An example of the related species Pseudicius kulczynskii

Pseudicius wesolowskae is a jumping spider that was first described by Mingsheng Zhu and Daxiang Song in 2001. They allocated the species to the genus Pseudicius, first raised by Eugène Simon in 1885. The genus name is related to two Greek words that can be translated false and honest. The genus was provisionally placed alongside Icius that, despite looking superficially similar, has a different etymology. The two genera have similar spermathecal structure but work by Wayne Maddison in 1987 demonstrated that they have very different DNA. They were placed in the tribe Heliophaninae alongside Afraflacilla and Marchena. The tribe is ubiquitous across most continents of the world. Maddison renamed the tribe Chrysillini in 2015. The tribe is a member of the clade Saltafresia within the subfamily Salticoida. A year later, in 2016, Jerzy Prószyński allocated the genus to the Pseudiciines group of genera, named after the genus. The spiders have flattened and elongated body and characteristic colour patterns. The species is named after the Polish arachnologist Wanda Wesołowska.

== Description ==
Pseudicius wesolowskae is a small spider. The female has a typical body length of 3.43 mm (0.135 in). It has a cephalothorax that is typically 1.56 mm (0.061 in) long and typically 1.12 mm (0.044 in) wide. It has a flat light brown carapace scattered in short white hairs and spines, with black edges. The labium and sternum are dark brown. The chelicerae is lighter with two teeth at the front and one to the rear and the eye field is black. The abdomen is typically 1.87 mm (0.074 in) long and 1.29 mm (0.051 in) wide. Oval, it is dark brown, with a white front edge and a pattern of four horizontal white spots, The underside is grey-yellow with white hairs and a pair of larger round yellow-white spots to the front. The spinnerets are light. The legs are yellowish-brown to the front and darker brown to the back. The spider has spines that it uses to stridulate. The epigyne has w-shaped pocket and two copulatory openings. There long curved insemination ducts that lead to strongly sclerotised oval spermathecae.

The male is larger than the female with a typical body length of 3.78 mm (0.149 in). The body is slightly flat. The cephalothorax is slightly larger, typically measuring 1.71 mm (0.067 in) long and 1.17 mm (0.046 in) wide. The carapace and the legs are similar to the female. The chelicerae, labium and sternum are all light brown, as is the clypeus. The abdomen is typically 2.07 mm (0.081 in) long and 1.26 mm (0.050 in) wide and has a similar pattern to the female. The pedipalps are an unusual shape for the genus. There are two spines on the back tibia and the tibial apophyses consist of two fork-like appendages, one with ridges lining one side. The embolus is long and curved with a distinctive sharp end. There is a ridge to the base of the palpal bulb.

The spider is superficially similar to others in the species. It can be distinguished by the male's small embolus and the female's cross-shaped marking towards the rear of the epigyne.

== Behaviour ==
Like many jumping spiders, Pseudicius spiders do not spin webs to capture prey. Instead, they build silken cocoon-like retreats, in which they generally live solitarily. They are mainly diurnal hunters that use their good eyesight to spot their prey. Pseudicius spiders use visual displays during courtship and transmit vibratory signals through silk to communicate to other spiders. Courtship is complex, and involves often flexible dance displays. The spiders prey on ants, but also use the presence of ants nests as a decoy to predators.

== Distribution ==
Pseudicius spiders can be found across Afro-Eurasia and the Eastern hemisphere. Pseudicius wesolowskae is endemic to China. The holotype was found in Pingshan County during 1982. It was found in Zhuolu County in 2004 and has a species distribution across the province of Hebei.
