= Luxuria =

Luxuria may refer to:

- The vice of Lust
- Luxuria, a genus of molluscs
- Luxuria (band), a British pop group
- Wesolowskana, a genus of spiders formerly called Luxuria
- Vladimir Luxuria, Italian showperson and politician
