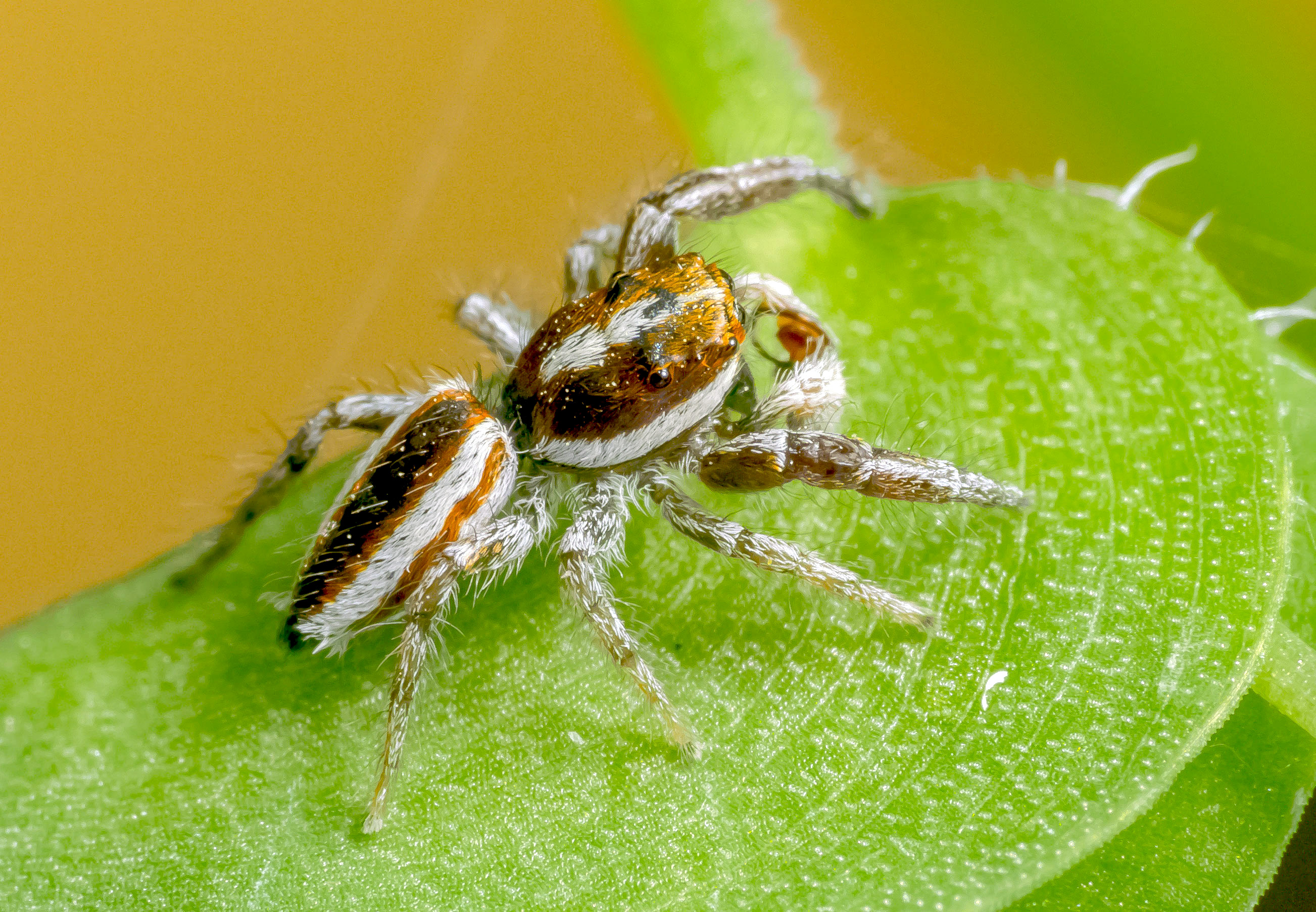
- A spider of the genus Afraflacilla

Scientific classification
- Kingdom: Animalia
- Phylum: Arthropoda
- Subphylum: Chelicerata
- Class: Arachnida
- Order: Araneae
- Infraorder: Araneomorphae
- Family: Salticidae
- Genus: Afraflacilla
- Species: A. fayda

Binomial name
- Afraflacilla fayda (Wesołowska & van Harten, 2010)

Synonyms
- Pseudicius fayda Wesołowska & van Harten, 2010

= Afraflacilla fayda =

Species of spider

The Fayda Jumper or Afraflacilla fayda is a species of jumping spider in the genus Afraflacilla that lives in the United Arab Emirates. The spider was first described in 2010 by Wanda Wesołowska and Antonius van Harten. The spider is small, with an cephalothorax that is typically 1.8 mm (0.07 in) and an abdomen typically 2.9 mm (0.11 in) long. The female has a distinctive design on its abdomen that includes a pattern of an indistinct light patch in the centre and two light patches to the rear on a greyish-beige background, darker to the end. In comparison, the carapace is a uniform brown with a darker brown eye field. The spider's legs are yellow, the first legs being larger and featuring stridulatory apparatus. It has distinctive copulatory organs. The female has long winding insemination ducts and large spermathecae. The male has not been described.

== Taxonomy ==
Afraflacilla fayda is a jumping spider, a member of the family Salticidae, that was first described by Wanda Wesołowska and Antonius van Harten in 2010. It is one of over 500 species identified by the Polish scientist Wesołowska during her career, leading her to be one of the most prolific in the field. They allocated the species to the genus Pseudicius, first circumscribed by Eugène Simon in 1885. The generic name is related to two Greek words that can be translated false and honest. The specific name recalls the place where it lives. It is known as the fayda jumper.

Pseudicius was provisionally placed alongside Icius that, despite looking superficially similar, has a different etymology. Indeed, Ekaterina Andreeva, Stefania Hęciak and Jerzy Prószyński looked to combine the genera in 1984. The two genera have similar spermathecal structure but work by Wayne Maddison in 1987 demonstrated that they have very different DNA. The two genera were placed in the tribe Heliophaninae alongside Afraflacilla and Marchena. The tribe is ubiquitous across most continents of the world. Maddison renamed the tribe Chrysillini in 2015. The tribe is a member of the clade Saltafresia within the subfamily Salticoida. A year later, in 2016, Jerzy Prószyński moved the species to the genus Afraflacilla on the basis of the shape of the copulatory organs. It was one of more than 40 species that were transferred between the two genera at the time. Afraflacilla had been created by Lucien Betland and Jacques Millot in 1941. It is also a member of the tribe Chrysillini.

Prószyński allocated the genus to the Pseudiciines group of genera in 2017, which was named after the genus Pseudicius. They can be distinguished from other jumping spiders by their flattened and elongated body and characteristic colour patterns.

== Description ==
The Fayda Jumper is a small spider with unique physical features. The spider's body is divided into two main parts, a cephalothorax and an abdomen. The cephalothorax that is typically 1.8 mm (0.07 in) long and 1.3 mm (0.05 in) wide. The female of this species have a carapace, the hard upper part of the cephalothorax, that is oval, low and brown, with a covering of dense light grey hairs. It has a darker brown eye field with long brown bristles near the eyes themselves. Some of the eyes are surrounded by short white hairs and white hairy patches. The spider's face, or clypeus, is low and also brown with white hairs. The mouthparts are unusual, with brown chelicerae, an orange labium and orange maxilae. The underside of the carapace, or sternum, is yellow. The abdomen is typically 2.9 mm (0.11 in) long and 1.4 mm (0.06 in) wide. It is an elongated oval that is greyish-beige, darker to the end, with a pattern of an indistinct light patch in the centre and two light patches to the rear. The front edges and sides are whitish. The underside of the abdomen is whitish with silver marking formed of translucent crystals. The spinnerets are grey. The spider's legs are yellow with brown leg hairs. The front pair of legs are thicker and have spines on them. The spider has stridulatory apparatus that is typical for the genus. The spider rubs its front legs against a row of fine hairs on the side of the carapace.

The spider has unusual copulatory organs. The epigyne has two large pockets to the front that are placed very closely together. The copulatory openings lead to long winding insemination ducts. The ducts have slight sclerotization near the entrances. The receptacles, or spermathecae, are large. The combination of the greater number of loops in its insemination ducts and larger spermathecae help distinguish the species from the related Afraflacilla tamaricis, another genus that had also been previously allocated to the genus Pseudicius. Otherwise, the distinctive pattern on the abdomen is the feature that most helps identify the species. The male has not been described.

== Behaviour ==
Like many jumping spiders, the Fayda Jumper, Afraflacilla fayda, does not spin webs to capture prey. Instead, it will hunt at night amongst foliage.

== Distribution and habitat ==
Afraflacilla fayda is endemic to the United Arab Emirates. The male holotype was found near al Ain] al-Fayda in the Emirate of Abu Dhabi in 2005. It has also been discovered in Mushrif Park in the Emirate of Dubai. The spider has been observed living amongst the leaves of Prosopis cineraria trees in vegetated dunes.
