= Pseudicius pseudocourtauldi =

Scientific classification
- Kingdom: Animalia
- Phylum: Arthropoda
- Subphylum: Chelicerata
- Class: Arachnida
- Order: Araneae
- Infraorder: Araneomorphae
- Family: Salticidae
- Genus: Pseudicius
- Species: P. pseudocourtauldi

Binomial name
- Pseudicius pseudocourtauldi Logunov, 1999

Species of jumping spider

Pseudicius pseudocourtauldi is a species of jumping spider in the genus Pseudicius that lives in Armenia. It has been found living in an almond plantation. The spider has a yellowish-brown carapace that is between 2.03 and 2.28 mm (0.080 and 0.090 in) long and an abdomen that is between 2.6 and 3.4 mm (0.10 and 0.13 in) long. The female's carapace is covered with white scales while the male has a pattern of lines formed by white scales. The female's abdomen is larger and yellow, crossed with a band of brown scales on top. The male's abdomen has a top that has white bands on a brown background and a brownish underside that is marked with yellow stripes. The male has a distinctive shape of its appendages, or tibial apophyses, on its copulatory organs that helps distinguish it from related species. The spider was first found in 1989 and described by Dmitri Logunov ten years later.

== Taxonomy and etymology ==
Pseudicius pseudocourtauldi is a species of jumping spider, a member of the family Salticidae, that was first described by Dmiiri Logunov in 1999. He allocated the species to the genus Pseudicius as it most closely related to the species Pseudicius courtauldi. The specific name relates to this similarity. First circumscribed by Eugène Simon in 1885, the genus is paraphyletic and many of the species allocated to it have been moved between it and other genera. As well as Pseudicius courtauldi, the species is part of the same species group as Pseudicius palaestinensis.

Pseudicius is a member of the tribe Heliophaninae, which is ubiquitous across most continents of the world. Wayne Maddison renamed the monotypic tribe Chrysillini in 2015. The tribe is a member of the clade Saltafresia within the subfamily Salticoida. In 2017, Prószyński allocated the genus to the Pseudiciines group of genera, which he named after the genus. They can be distinguished from other jumping spiders by their flattened and elongated body and characteristic colour patterns. The genus is closely related to Afraflacilla.

== Description ==
Pseudicius spiders have two parts to their body, a cephalothorax and an abdomen. The male Pseudicius pseudocourtauldi has a yellowish-brown carapace, the hard upper side of the cephalothorax, that is typically 2.28 mm (0.090 in) long and 1.5 mm (0.059 in) wide. It is marked with a band of white scales near its fovea and a line of white scales on its edges. There are also white scales on the spider's eye field and black areas around its eyes. Its sternum, or the underside of its cephalothorax, is brown. It has a white hairy clypeus, or face. The spider's mouthparts, including its chelicerae, labium, and maxillae, are also brown.

The male's abdomen is larger than its carapace typically 2.6 mm (0.10 in) long and 1.65 mm (0.065 in) wide. Its topside is brown with two wide white bands running down its length and its underside is brownish with two narrow yellow stripes from front to back. Its book lung covers are yellow and its spinnerets are brown. Its front legs are brown and nearly twice the length of the others, which are yellow.

Its copulatory organs are unusual. It has a bulbous palpal bulb with a particularly large bulge towards the bottom that juts away from the cymbium. The top of the bulb forms into a pointed and curved embolus that points towards a valley in the cymbium. On the palpal tibia, there are two appendages, or apophyses, one blunt and the other shaped like a scoop. It is the shape of these apophyses that most clearly distinguishes the species from its relatives.

The female's yellowish-brown carapace is typically 2.03 mm (0.080 in) long and 1.43 mm (0.056 in) wide is entirely covered in white scales and its sternum is brownish-yellow, similar to its chelicerae, labium and maxillae. Its clypeus has a covering of even more dense hairs. Its abdomen is larger than the male, typically 3.4 mm (0.13 in) long and 1.98 mm (0.078 in) wide, and is yellow with a pattern of two bands formed of brown scales visible on the topside. Unlike the male, all the spider's legs are yellow and marked with brown patterns.

The female can also be distinguished from its relatives by its copulatory organs. Its epigyne, the external visible part of its copulatory organs, has two pockets placed side by side and tow small copulatory openings. These lead via short insemination ducts to unusually-shaped bean-like spermathecae or receptacles.

== Distribution and habitat ==
Pseudicius spiders can be found across the Afrotropical, Oriental and Palaearctic realms. Pseudicius pseudocourtauldi is endemic to Armenia. It is restricted to the Syunik Province and the first species in the genus that has been found in the country. The male holotype was found near Meghri in 1989 living in an almond plantation. Other examples have also been found nearby. Spiders in the genus typically live on rocks or the barks of trees.
