= Wesolowskana lymphatica =

Scientific classification
- Kingdom: Animalia
- Phylum: Arthropoda
- Subphylum: Chelicerata
- Class: Arachnida
- Order: Araneae
- Infraorder: Araneomorphae
- Family: Salticidae
- Genus: Wesolowskana
- Species: W. lymphatica

Binomial name
- Wesolowskana lymphatica Wesołowska, 1989

Synonyms
- Luxuria lymphatica Wesołowska, 1989; Baryphas dubius Wesołowska, 1989

Species of spider

Wesolowskana lymphatica is a species of jumping spiders of the family Salticidae. It is endemic in Cape Verde. The species was first described as Luxuria lymphatica by Wesołowska in 1989. It was renamed in 2008, because the genus Luxuria was already in use for a genus of molluscs.

== Description ==
The cephalothorax of the female holotype measures 2.5–2.7 mm, and the abdomen 2.6–3.3 mm.
