= Pseudicius athleta =

Scientific classification
- Kingdom: Animalia
- Phylum: Arthropoda
- Subphylum: Chelicerata
- Class: Arachnida
- Order: Araneae
- Infraorder: Araneomorphae
- Family: Salticidae
- Genus: Pseudicius
- Species: P. athleta

Binomial name
- Pseudicius athleta Wesołowska, 2011

Species of spider

Pseudicius athleta is a species of jumping spider in the genus Pseudicius that is found in Kenya and Uganda. The spider was first defined in 2011 by Wanda Wesołowska. It lives communally, in individual nests which may contain either male or female spiders, which engage in complex courtship rituals. The spider is small, with an elongated cephalothorax between 1.8 and 2.2 mm (0.07 and 0.09 in) long and an abdomen between 2.2 and 2.8 mm (0.09 and 0.11 in) long. The carapace is dark brown with a black eye field but the abdomen has a pattern that differs between the male, which is marked by a brownish-fawn streak, and the female, which has a complex pattern consisting of a herring-bone pattern on the top, diagonal patches on the edge and two small round white spots on the bottom. Pseudicius athleta can be differentiated from other species in the genus by its copulatory organs. The male has a long thin embolus and characteristic tibial apophysis, which has three prongs. The female has narrow tube-like spermathecae. However, it is the swollen first leg, which is reminiscent of the large muscle of an athlete, as reflected in the species name, that most easily identifies the species.

== Taxonomy ==
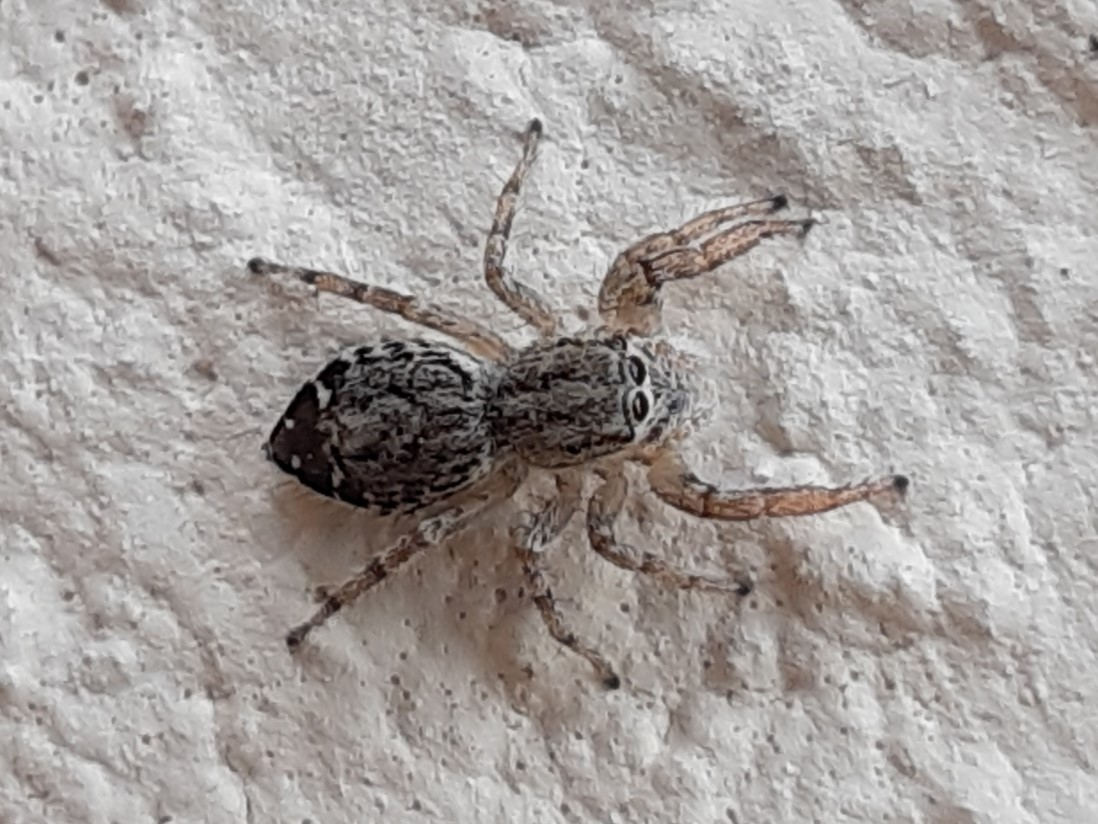
An example of the related species Pseudicius kulczynskii

Pseudicius athleta is a jumping spider that was first described by the Polish arachnologist Wanda Wesołowska in 2011. It was one of more than 500 species that she identified in her career, which makes her one of the most prolific scientists in the discipline. She allocated the species to the genus Pseudicius, first circumscribed by Eugène Simon in 1885. The genus name is related to two Greek words that can be translated false and honest. The genus was provisionally placed alongside Icius. As they are superficially similar, Ekaterina Andreeva, Stefania Hęciak and Jerzy Prószyński looked to combine the genera in 1984. The two genera have similar spermathecal structure but work by Wayne Maddison in 1987 demonstrated that they have very different DNA. Also, despite the names looking similar, they have different etymologies. They were kept separate, but recognised as related. The two genera were placed in the tribe Heliophaninae alongside Afraflacilla and Marchena. The tribe is ubiquitous across most continents of the world. Maddison renamed the tribe Chrysillini in 2015. The tribe is a member of the clade Saltafresia within the subfamily Salticoida. A year later, in 2016, Jerzy Prószyński allocated the genus to the Pseudiciines group of genera, which was named after the genus. Marchena is a member of the group, but Icius is not. They have flattened and elongated body and a characteristic colour pattern. The species is named for a Latin word meaning muscular, referring to the shape of the first leg, whose swollen shape is reminiscent of an enlarged muscle.

== Description ==
The species is a small spider with a shape that is typical of the genus. The spider's body is divided into two main parts: the cephalothorax and the abdomen. The male has a brown cephalothorax that is between 1.8 and 2.2 mm (0.07 and 0.09 in) long and 1.3 and 1.5 mm (0.05 and 0.06 in) wide. It has a dark brown carapace, the hard upper part of the cephalothorax, that is elongated, very flattened and covered in delicate grey-white hairs. The eye field is black with very brown bristles near the eyes. There is a thin line down the middle of the eye field and thorax of white hairs. The sternum, the lower part of the cephalothorax, is brown.The spider has dark brown mouthparts. The abdomen is also elongated, between 2.4 and 2.8 mm (0.09 and 0.11 in) long and 1.4 and 1.7 mm (0.06 and 0.07 in) wide. The top is covered in brown and white hairs and has a brownish-fawn streak running from the front to back. The sides are light with two or three pairs of diagonal dark patches on the edges. The underside is yellow. The spinnerets are grey. The front legs are long and brown, the remainder yellow or light brown, and covered in brown hairs. They have a thick tibia which looks like a swollen muscle. The copulatory organs are distinctive. The palpal bulb is also swollen with a rounded cymbium. The spider has a long thin embolus and a characteristic tibia with a two-pronged apophysis at its crown and a tooth-like spike halfway down the appendage.

The female is similar to the male. The cephalothorax is between 1.9 and 2.2 mm (0.07 and 0.09 in) long and 1.3 and 1.5 mm (0.05 and 0.06 in) wide and the greyish-beige abdomen between 2.2 and 2.8 mm (0.09 and 0.11 in) long and 1.4 and 1.8 mm (0.06 and 0.07 in) wide. The carapace is similar to the male. The abdomen has a herring-bone faint but darker pattern on the top, diagonal patches on the edge and two small round white spots ringed by black flanges. The first legs are thinner but still have the swollen feature that is characteristic of the species. The epigyne has gonopores to the rear of the copulatory openings, which lead, via curled seminal ducts, to narrow tube-like spermathecae. The epigyne also has characteristic accessory glands.

The spider is similar to others in the genus. Its swollen foreleg, recalled in the species name, is its most distinctive feature. The female can be identified by its epigyne, both the presence of gonopores and copulatory openings to the rear and the very narrow spermathecae. The male can also be distinguished by its copulatory organs, particularly its long thin embolus and distinctive tibia apophysis, for both its two-pronged crown and additional tooth.

== Behaviour ==
Pseudicius athleta lives communally in large nests within the complicated interconnected webs of other spiders. Each spider lives in its own territorial nest within the complex. The males live with immature females in their nests until they are able to mate, at which time they perform complex courtship rituals. The courtship activity is vibratory in the nests and visual outside the nests. The males will also embrace each other when they meet. Like many jumping spiders, it does not spin webs to capture prey. Instead, it is mainly a diurnal hunter that uses its good eyesight to spot its prey. The spider uses visual displays during courtship and transmits vibratory signals through silk to communicate to other spiders.

== Distribution ==
Pseudicius athleta lives in Kenya and Uganda. The holotype, a male, was collected near Entebbe in 1996. Other examples of both sexes were found locally the following year. The first example in Kenya was found at Mbita Point on the shore of Lake Victoria in 1998. It prefers to live near water.
