= Pseudicius maculatus =

Scientific classification
- Kingdom: Animalia
- Phylum: Arthropoda
- Subphylum: Chelicerata
- Class: Arachnida
- Order: Araneae
- Infraorder: Araneomorphae
- Family: Salticidae
- Genus: Pseudicius
- Species: P. maculatus

Binomial name
- Pseudicius maculatus Haddad & Wesołowska, 2011

Species of spider

Pseudicius maculatus is a species of jumping spider in the genus Pseudicius that lives in Lesotho and South Africa. The spider was first defined in 2011 by Charles Haddad and Wanda Wesołowska. The spider is small, with a carapace and abdomen each that measure between 2.5 and 2.7 mm (0.10 and 0.11 in) long. The carapace is chocolate-brown and covered in white hairs. The abdomen has a pattern of white patches which are more distinctive on the female. These give the species its name. It also has a characteristic longer and stouter foreleg. The species is similar to the related Pseudicius africanus, apart from the pattern on the abdomen. It also differs in its copulatory organs, particularly the sioting of the copulatory openings on the female epigyne and the shorter male embolus.

== Taxonomy ==
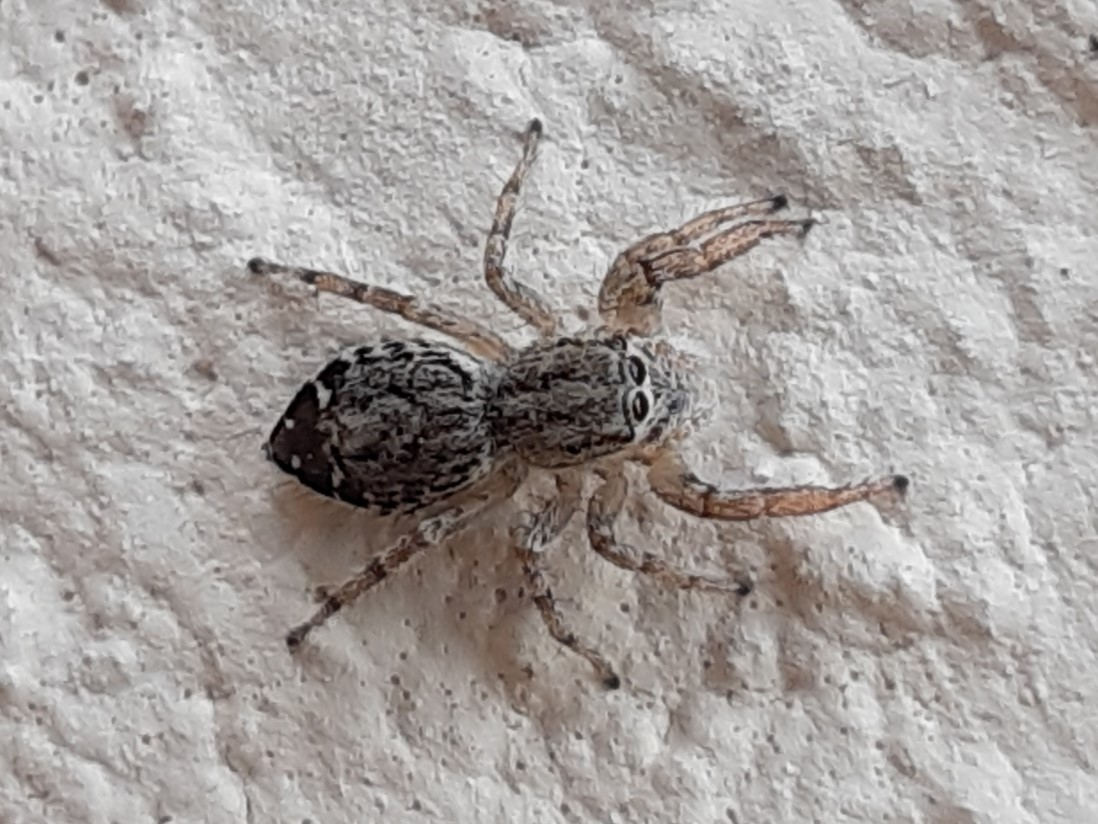
An example of the related species Pseudicius kulczynskii

Pseudicius maculatus is a jumping spider that was first described by Charles Haddad and Wanda Wesołowska in 2011. They allocated the species to the genus Pseudicius, first circumscribed by Eugène Simon in 1885. The genus name is related to two Greek words that can be translated false and honest. The genus was provisionally placed alongside Icius that, despite looking superficially similar, has a different etymology. Indeed, Ekaterina Andreeva, Stefania Hęciak and Jerzy Prószyński looked to combine the genera in 1984. The two genera have similar spermathecal structure but work by Wayne Maddison in 1987 demonstrated that they have very different DNA. The two genera were placed in the tribe Heliophaninae alongside Afraflacilla and Marchena. The tribe is ubiquitous across most continents of the world. Maddison renamed the tribe Chrysillini in 2015. The tribe is a member of the clade Saltafresia within the subfamily Salticoida. A year later, in 2016, Jerzy Prószyński allocated the genus to the Pseudiciines group of genera, which was named after the genus. Marchena is a member of the group, while Icius is not. They have a flattened and elongated body and characteristic colour patterns. The species name is based on a Latin word that can be translated spotted or speckled and recalls the pattern on the spider's abdomen.

== Description ==
Pseudicius maculatus is a small spider. The male has a carapace that is typically 2.7 mm (0.11 in) long and 2.0 mm (0.08 in) wide. Oval, slightly pear-shaped and flattened, it is chocolate brown with a covering of white hairs. It has a black eye field with brown bristles and patches of fawn scales around the eyes themselves. The underside, or sternum, is dark brown. The spider has large chelicerae and dark brown labium. The oval abdomen is typically 2.7 mm (0.11 in) long and 1.9 mm (0.07 in) wide. It is greyish-brown with a pattern of irregular and indistinct white patches on its topside and a dark underside. The top is covered in brown and white hairs. The spinnerets are dark The legs are dark brown and covered in long, brown and pale leg hairs. The forelegs are very stout and long compared to the others. The pedipalps are pale brown. The tibial apophysis is very large, particularly in width, and has a pattern of tooth-like appendages. The spider has a curved embolus that points to the cymbium.

The female is similar to the male. The carapace is similar, measuring typically 2.5 mm (0.098 in) long and 1.7 mm (0.067 in) wide. The white hairs are less numerous and there is a small line of white hairs near the eyes. The sternum is brownish, as are the mouthparts.. The abdomen is typically 2.5 mm (0.098 in) long and 1.6 mm (0.063 in) wide. Compared to the male, it has a clearer pattern of black and yellow patches on the topside and a lighter underside. The legs are yellow. The spider has an epigyne with a large oval central depression leading to a deep pocket that has gonopores on its edges. The short wide seminal ducts lead to single-chambered, heavily sclerotized receptacles.

The species is similar to Pseudicius africanus, but can be recognised by its abdominal pattern. The male has a slightly shorter embolus and the tibial apophysis has an extra tooth. The female can be distinguished by the position of its copulatory openings, which are on the edge of the depression rather than the middle.

== Distribution and habitat ==
Pseudicius spiders can be found across Afro-Eurasia and the Eastern hemisphere. Pseudicius maculatus is found in Lesotho and South Africa. The holotype was found near Bethlehem in Free State, South Africa, during 1995. It was subsequently also found in Addo Elephant National Park and the Amathole Mountains in Eastern Cape. The first examples to be found in Lesotho were discovered near the Mohale Dam in Maseru District and near the Sebapela River in Quthing District. The spider thrives in both grassland and thickets, living in shrubs and trees.
