= Wesolowskana =

Scientific classification
- Kingdom: Animalia
- Phylum: Arthropoda
- Subphylum: Chelicerata
- Class: Arachnida
- Order: Araneae
- Infraorder: Araneomorphae
- Family: Salticidae
- Subfamily: Salticinae
- Genus: Wesolowskana; Koçak & Kemal, 2008

Species
- Wesolowskana lymphatica (Wesolowska, 1989); Wesolowskana marginella (Simon, 1883)

Synonyms
- Luxuria Wesolowska, 1989 (preoccupied name)

Genus of spiders

Wesolowskana is a spider genus of the family Salticidae (jumping spiders). Both described species are endemic to the Cape Verde Islands. The genus should possibly be included in the genus Pseudicius. It was originally named Luxuria when it was first described by Wanda Wesołowska in 1989. It was renamed in 2008 because Luxuria was already in use for a genus of molluscs. This genus was named in honour of Wanda Wesołowska.
