= Athleta =

Athleta may refer to:

- Athleta (moth), a genus of moths
- Athleta (gastropod), a genus of sea snails
- Athleta Christi, a class of Early Christian soldiers
- Scyrotis athleta, a species of moth
- Athleta Juvenis, a Maltese football club
- Pseudicius athleta, a species of jumping spider
- Athleta (association football brand), a Japanese sports equipment brand
- Athleta (athleisure brand), an athleisure fashion brand
