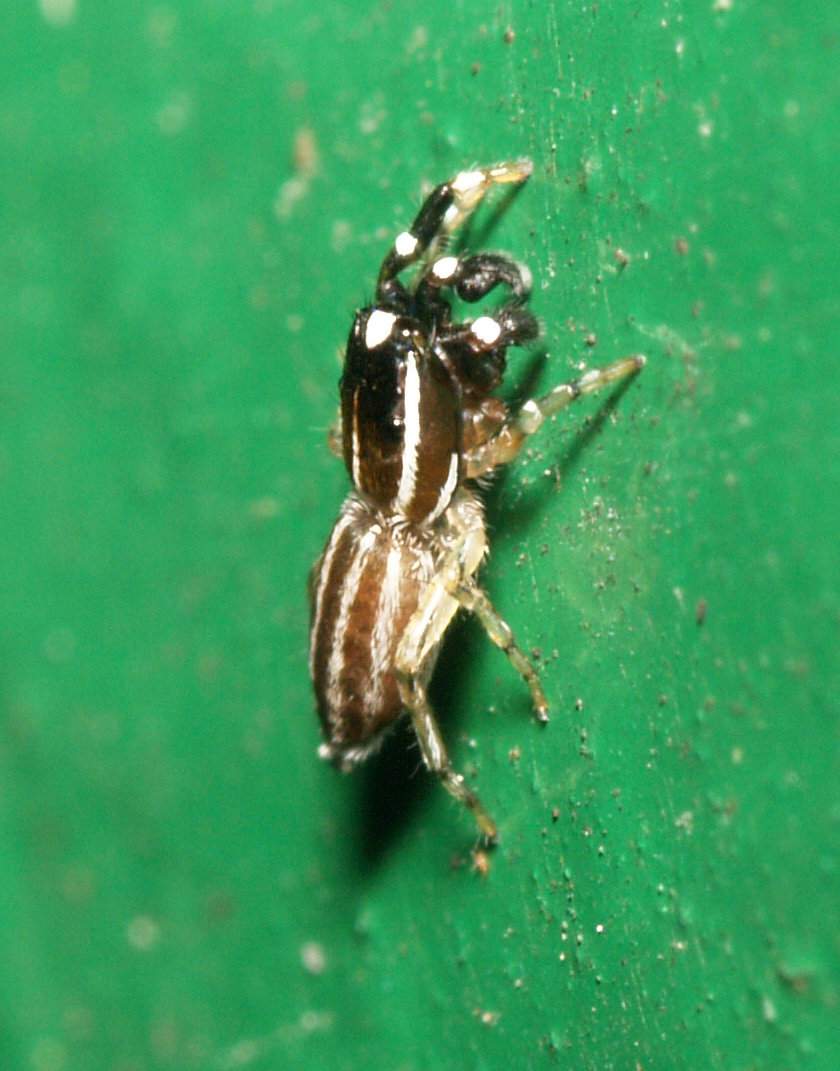
- Pseudicius sp. in Hong Kong
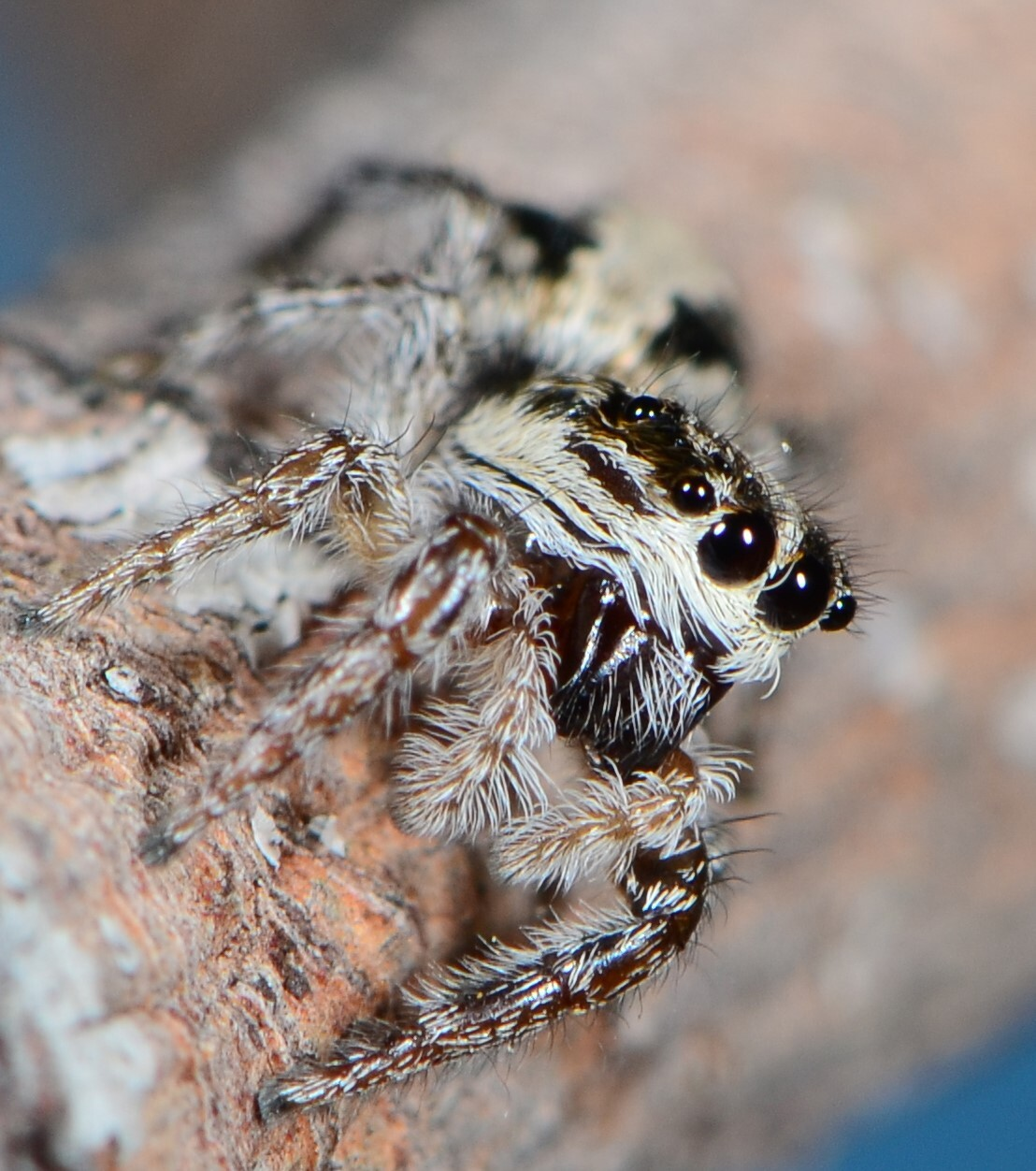
- female P. adustus in South Africa

Scientific classification
- Kingdom: Animalia
- Phylum: Arthropoda
- Subphylum: Chelicerata
- Class: Arachnida
- Order: Araneae
- Infraorder: Araneomorphae
- Family: Salticidae
- Subfamily: Salticinae
- Genus: Pseudicius; Simon, 1885

Type species
- Aranea encarpata Walckenaer, 1802

Species
- See text.

Diversity
- 34 species

Synonyms
- Savaiia

= Pseudicius =

Genus of spiders

Pseudicius is a genus of the jumping spiders first described by Eugène Simon in 1885. The name is combined of Greek pseudo "false" and the salticid genus name Icius. The small genus Wesolowskana (formerly known as Luxuria) should possibly be included in this genus. There is some dispute whether Afraflacilla is a distinct genus or should be included in Pseudicius. Festucula and Marchena are other close relatives, these genera form a monophyletic group.

Many species formerly placed in this genus have been transferred to a variety of other genera.

== Species ==
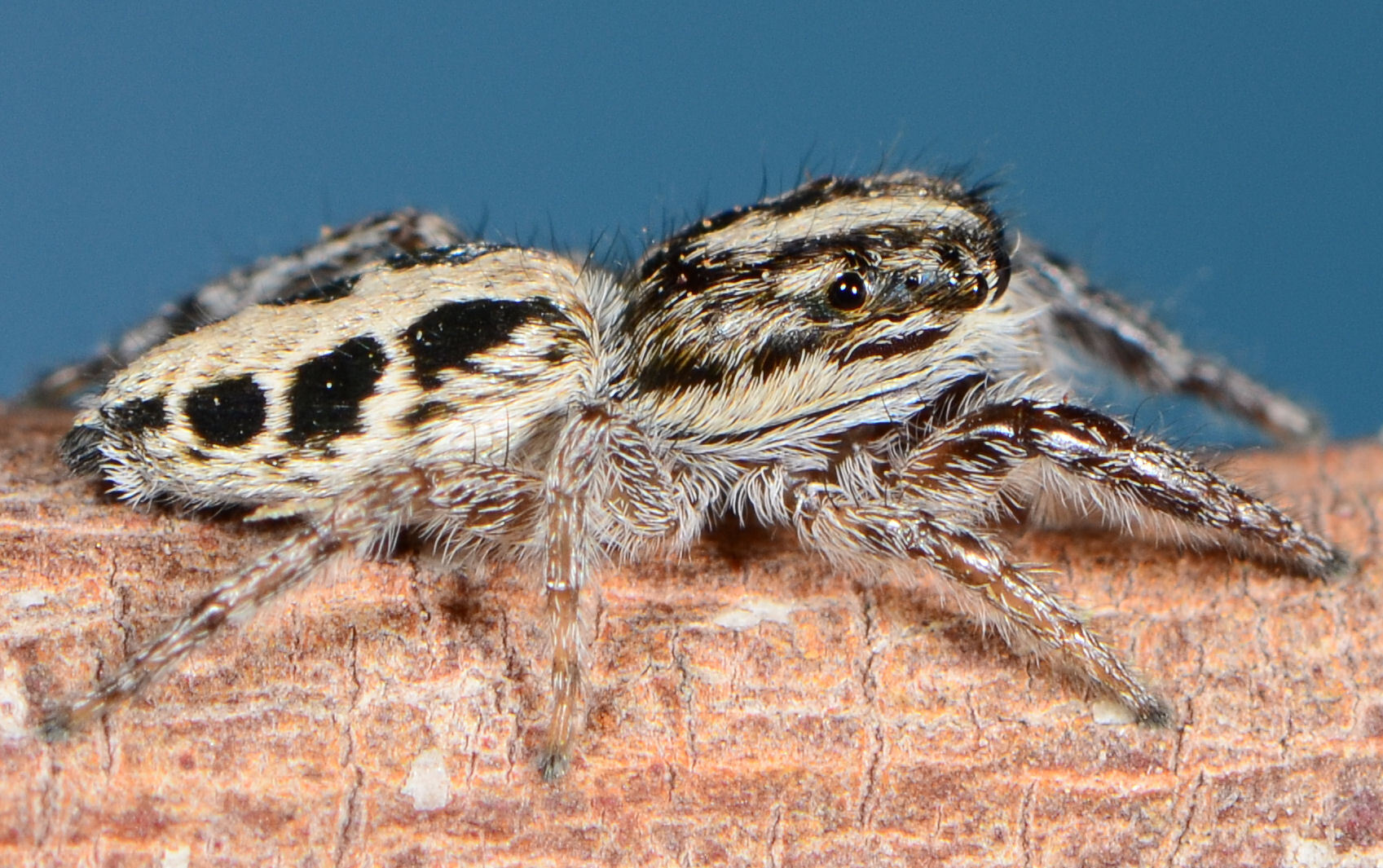
female P. adustus

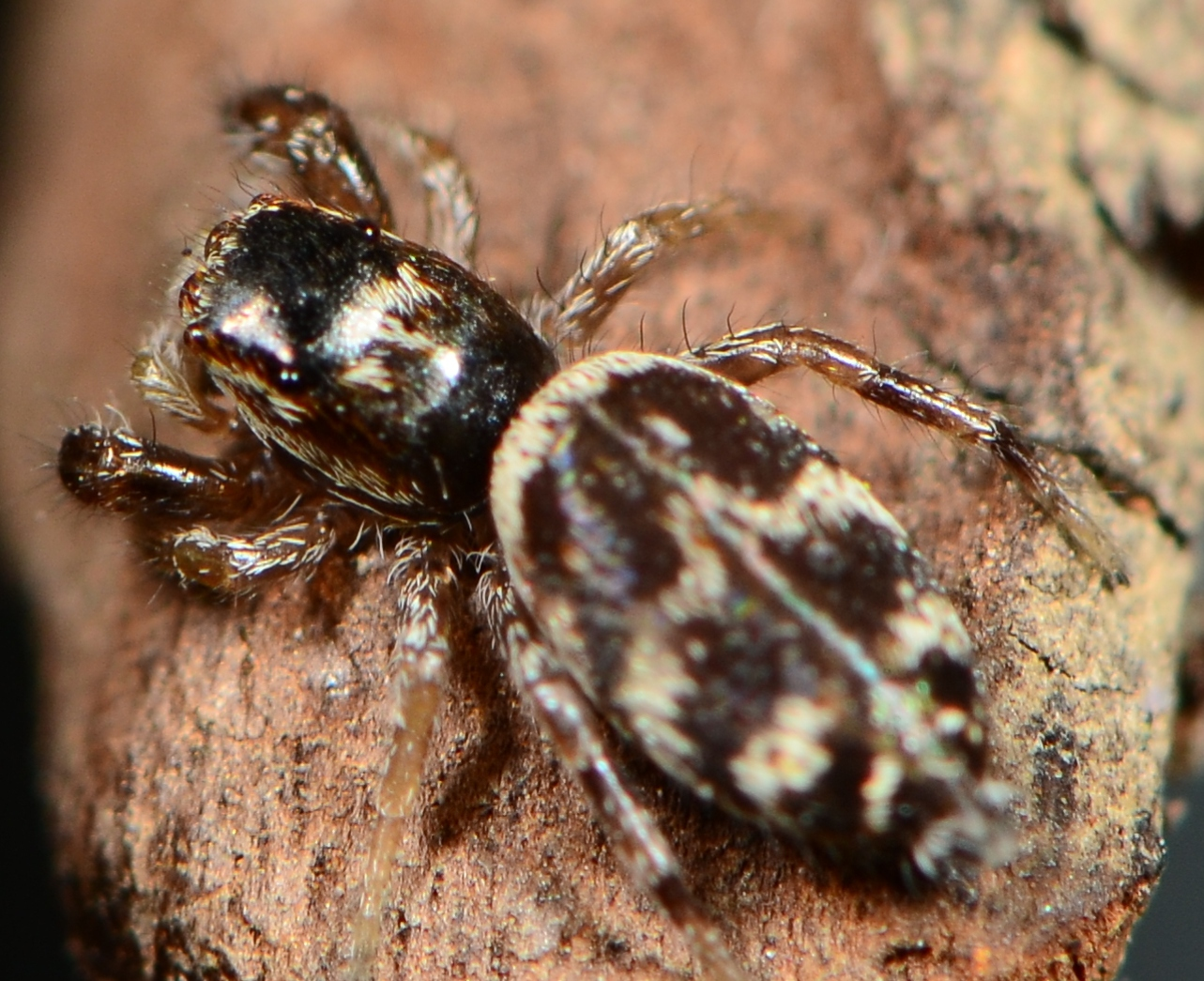
female P. gracilis

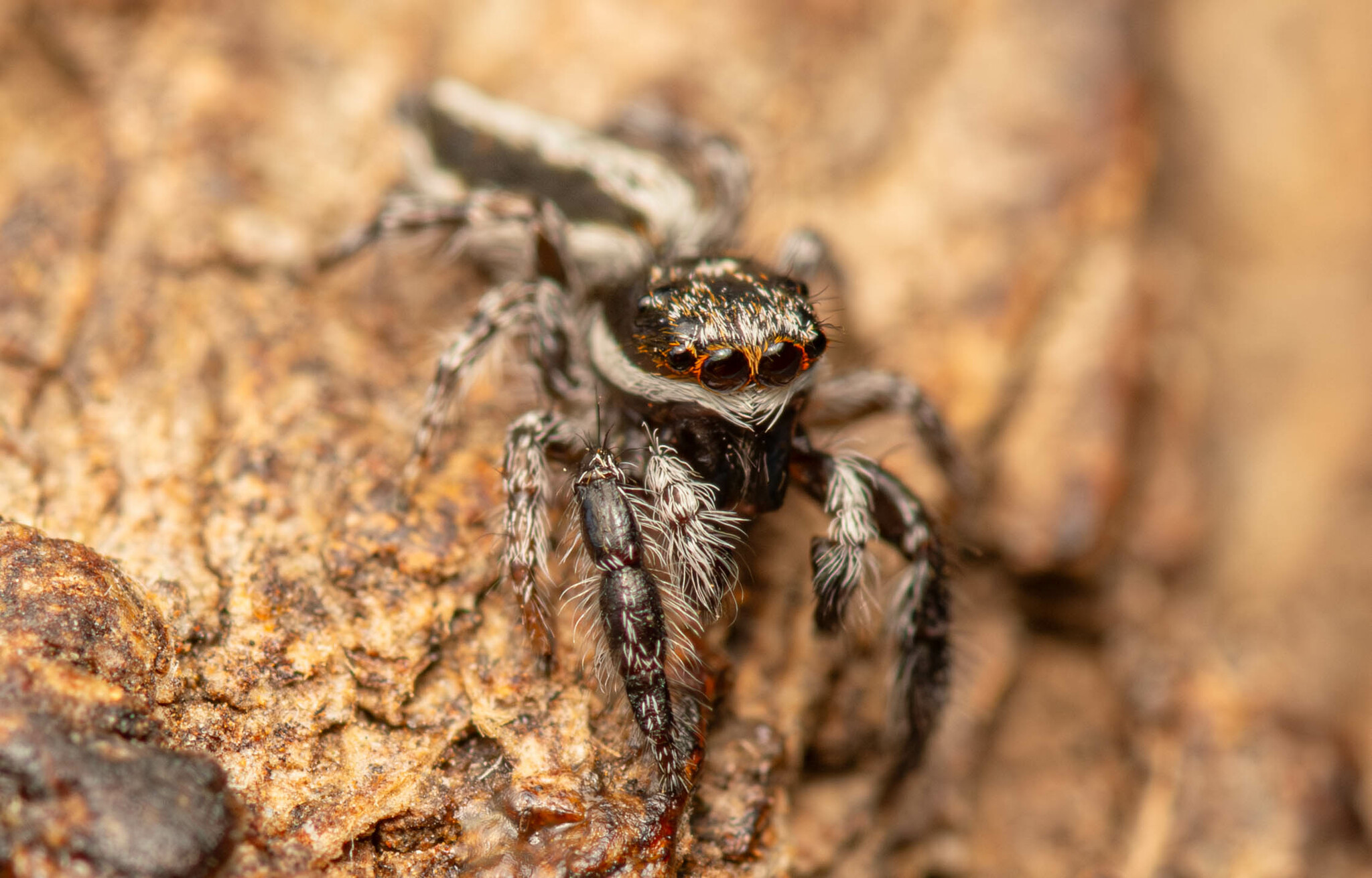
male P dentatus

As of October 2025, this genus includes 34 species:

- Pseudicius adustus Wesołowska, 2006 – Namibia
- Pseudicius africanus G. W. Peckham & E. G. Peckham, 1903 – South Africa, Lesotho
- Pseudicius amicus Prószyński, 2000 – Syria, Israel
- Pseudicius athleta Wesołowska, 2011 – Uganda, Kenya
- Pseudicius badius (Simon, 1868) – France (Corsica), Italy to Iran
- Pseudicius courtauldi Bristowe, 1935 – Greece to China
- Pseudicius cultrifer Caporiacco, 1948 – Greece (Rhodes)
- Pseudicius decemnotatus Simon, 1886 – Singapore
- Pseudicius elmenteitae Caporiacco, 1949 – Kenya
- Pseudicius encarpatus (Walckenaer, 1802) – Europe to Kazakhstan (type species)
- Pseudicius espereyi Fage, 1921 – Greece
- Pseudicius femineus Wesołowska & Haddad, 2013 – South Africa
- Pseudicius flabellus Wesołowska & Haddad, 2013 – South Africa
- Pseudicius ghesquieri (Giltay, 1935) – DR Congo, Uganda
- Pseudicius gracilis Haddad & Wesołowska, 2011 – South Africa
- Pseudicius icioides (Simon, 1884) – Sudan
- Pseudicius kaszabi (Żabka, 1985) – Vietnam
- Pseudicius kulczynskii Nosek, 1905 – Albania, Bulgaria, Greece, Turkey, Syria
- Pseudicius maculatus Haddad & Wesołowska, 2011 – South Africa, Lesotho
- Pseudicius marshi (G. W. Peckham & E. G. Peckham, 1903) – South Africa
- Pseudicius mirus Wesołowska & van Harten, 2002 – Yemen (Socotra)
- Pseudicius musculus Simon, 1901 – Algeria, South Africa
- Pseudicius oblongus G. W. Peckham & E. G. Peckham, 1894 – Brazil
- Pseudicius palaestinensis Strand, 1915 – Turkey, Azerbaijan, Israel, Iran
- Pseudicius picaceus (Simon, 1868) – Mediterranean to Azerbaijan
- Pseudicius procerus Wesołowska & Haddad, 2018 – South Africa
- Pseudicius pseudocourtauldi Logunov, 1999 – Armenia
- Pseudicius punctatus (Marples, 1957) – Fiji, Samoa, Caroline Is.
- Pseudicius ridicularis Wesołowska & Tomasiewicz, 2008 – Ethiopia
- Pseudicius vankeeri Metzner, 1999 – Greece, Turkey, Cyprus, Israel
- Pseudicius wesolowskae Zhu & Song, 2001 – China
- Pseudicius yunnanensis (Schenkel, 1963) – China
- Pseudicius zabkai Song & Zhu, 2001 – China
- Pseudicius zebra Simon, 1902 – South Africa
