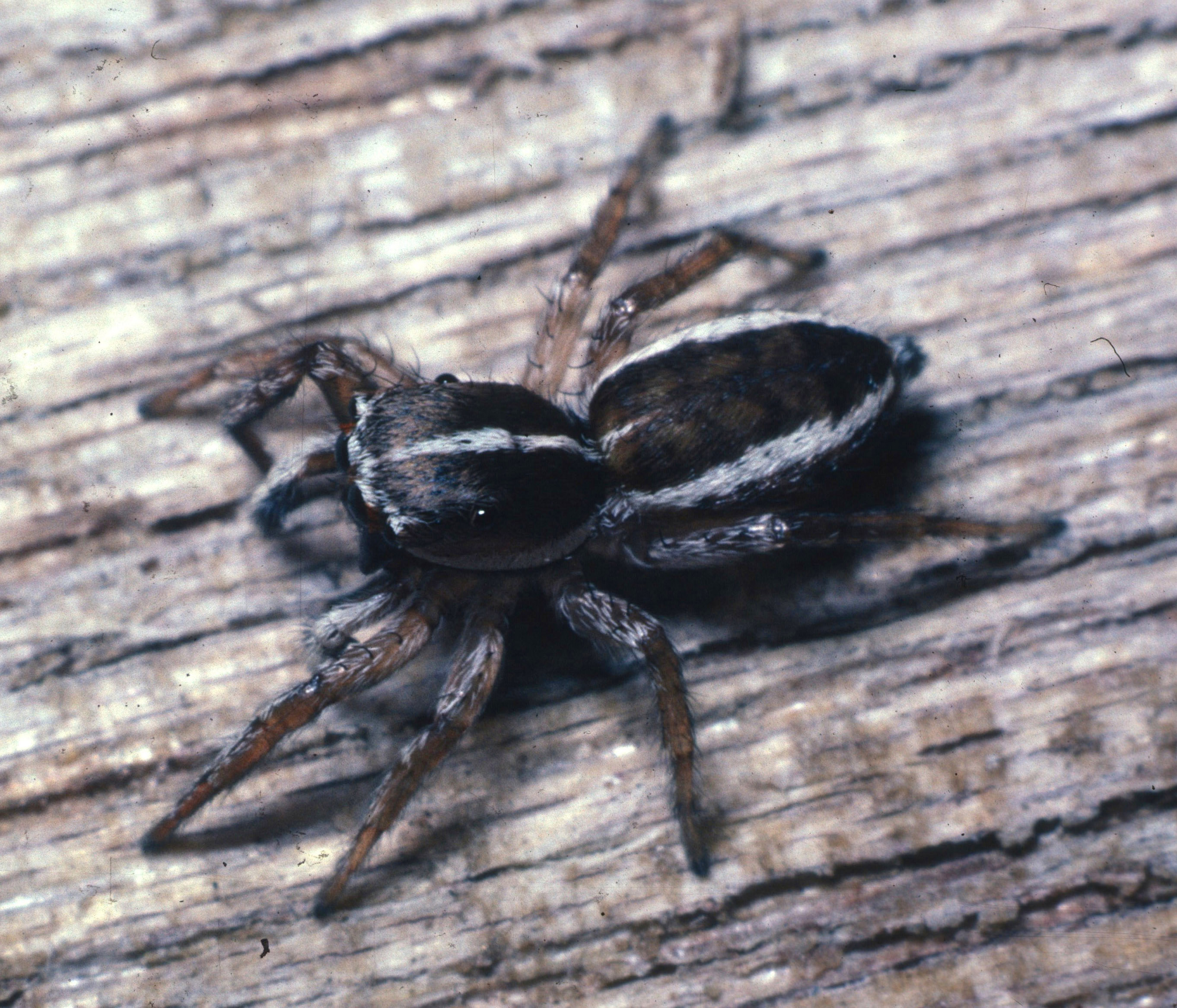
- Male Marchena minuta in Humboldt County, California

Scientific classification
- Kingdom: Animalia
- Phylum: Arthropoda
- Subphylum: Chelicerata
- Class: Arachnida
- Order: Araneae
- Infraorder: Araneomorphae
- Family: Salticidae
- Genus: Marchena
- Species: M. minuta

Binomial name
- Marchena minuta (Peckham & Peckham, 1888)

= Marchena =

Genus of spiders

Marchena is a genus of jumping spiders only found in the United States. Its only described species, M. minuta, dwells on the barks of conifers along the west coast, especially California, Washington and Nevada.

It forms a monophyletic group with the genera Afraflacilla, Pseudicius and Festucula.

== Description ==
This species can easily be distinguished from others in its range by the tubercles on the first femur of its first legs. M. minuta has a body length of about 4 mm.

== Name ==
The genus name is probably derived from the Spanish city of Marchena, Seville. As witnessed by other generic names, the describers had a habit of naming taxa after places unrelated to the species' distribution. The species name is Latin for "small, minute".
