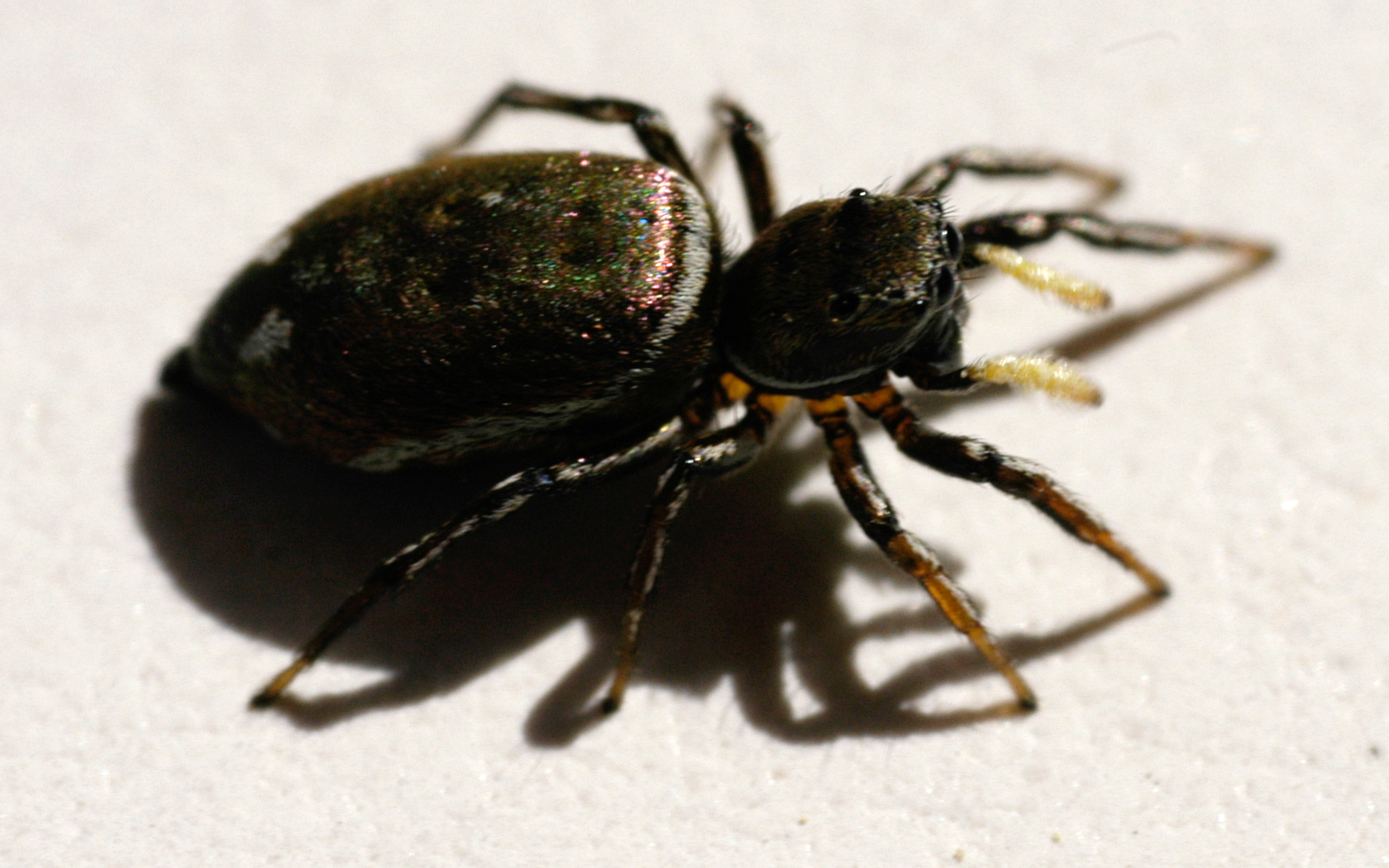
- Heliophanus

Scientific classification
- Kingdom: Animalia
- Phylum: Arthropoda
- Subphylum: Chelicerata
- Class: Arachnida
- Order: Araneae
- Infraorder: Araneomorphae
- Family: Salticidae
- Subfamily: Salticinae
- Tribe: Chrysillini; Simon, 1901

Genera
- See text

Synonyms
- Heliophaninae

= Chrysillini =

Tribe of jumping spider

Chrysillini is a tribe of jumping spider in the family Salticidae. In Maddison's 2015 revision of the family, the subfamily Heliophaninae was reclassified as a junior synonym of Chrysillini.

== Genera ==
- Afraflacilla
- Augustaea
- Chrysilla
- Cosmophasis
- Echinussa
- Epocilla
- Festucula
- Hakka
- Helicius
- Heliophanillus
- Heliophanus
- Helvetia
- Icius
- Kupiuka
- Marchena
- Matagaia
- Menemerus
- Mexcala
- Natta
- Ogdenia
- Orsima
- Paraheliophanus
- Phintella
- Plesiopiuka
- Siler
- Tasa
- Theriella
- Wesolowskana
- Yepoella
