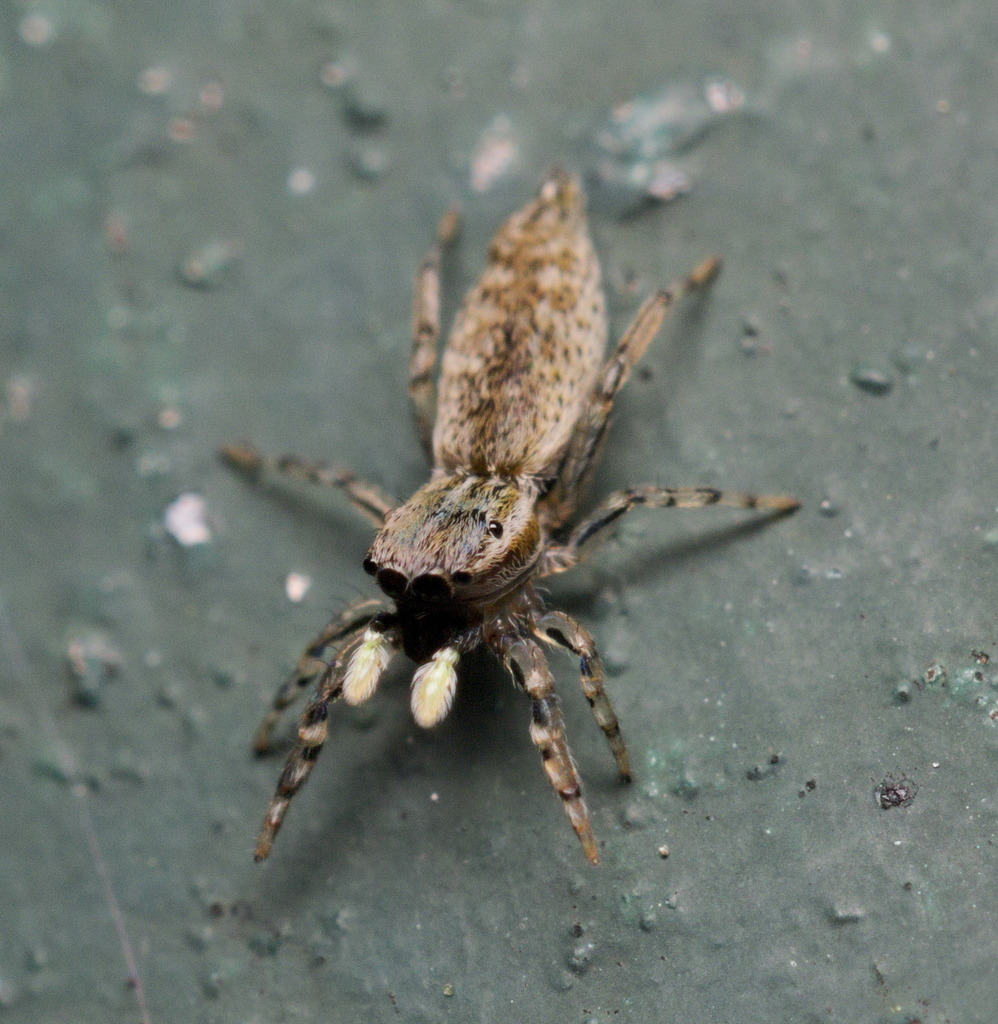
- female Nepalicius sp. from Hong Kong

Scientific classification
- Kingdom: Animalia
- Phylum: Arthropoda
- Subphylum: Chelicerata
- Class: Arachnida
- Order: Araneae
- Infraorder: Araneomorphae
- Family: Salticidae
- Subfamily: Salticinae
- Genus: Nepalicius; Prószyński, 2016

Type species
- Nepalicius nepalicus

Species
- See text

= Nepalicius =

Genus of spiders

Nepalicius was a genus of spiders in the family Salticidae. It was first described in 2016 by Jerzy Prószyński.

N. nepalicus and N. seychellensis were placed in genus Okinawicius by Wang et al. (2024), with N. koreanus placed in genus Tasa.

== Etymology ==
The genus name is a portmanteau of Nepal and the salticid genus Icius.

== Taxonomy ==
The genus Nepalicius was one of a number of new genera erected by Jerzy Prószyński in 2016, largely for species formerly placed in Pseudicius. Prószyński placed these genera in his informal group "pseudiciines", with Pseudicius as the representative genus. In Wayne Maddison's 2015 classification of the family Salticidae, Pseudicius, broadly circumscribed, is placed in the tribe Chrysillini, part of the Salticoida clade of the subfamily Salticinae.

=== Species ===
Nepalicius comprised the following species:

- Nepalicius koreanus (Wesołowska, 1981)
- Nepalicius nepalicus (Andreeva, Heciak & Prószyński, 1984)
- Nepalicius seychellensis (Wanless, 1984)
