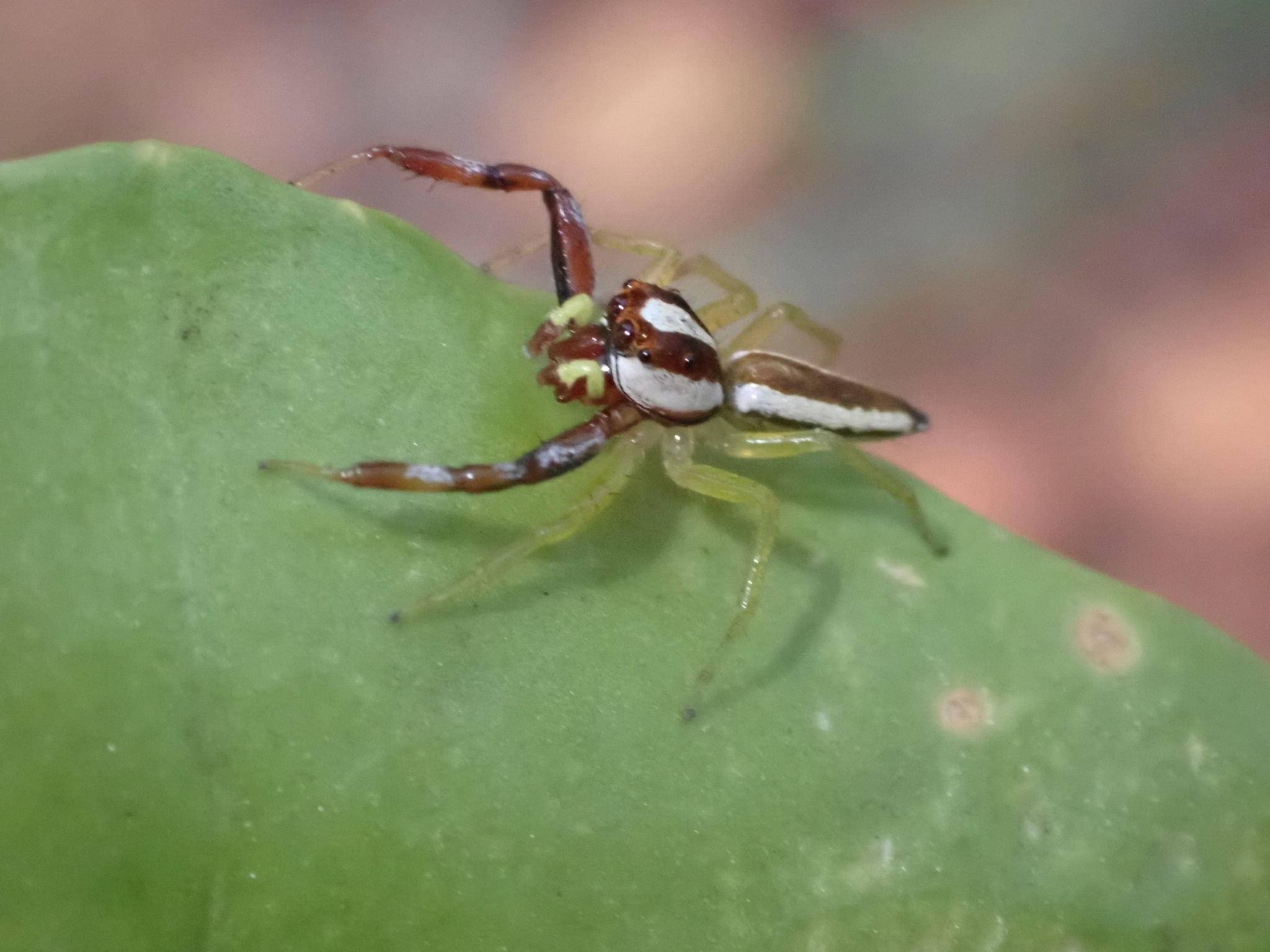
- male from Thailand

Scientific classification
- Kingdom: Animalia
- Phylum: Arthropoda
- Subphylum: Chelicerata
- Class: Arachnida
- Order: Araneae
- Infraorder: Araneomorphae
- Family: Salticidae
- Genus: Epocilla
- Species: E. praetextata

Binomial name
- Epocilla praetextata Thorell, 1887

= Epocilla praetextata =

Species of spider

Epocilla praetextata is a species of jumping spider in the genus Epocilla. It is the type species of its genus and is found across South and Southeast Asia.

== Taxonomy ==
Epocilla praetextata was first described by Swedish arachnologist Tamerlan Thorell in 1887 from specimens collected in Myanmar (then Burma). The species serves as the type species for the genus Epocilla, which Thorell established in the same publication.

== Distribution ==
E. praetextata has been recorded from India (including Manipur and Yunnan Province, China), Bhutan, Myanmar, and Indonesia (specifically Java).

== Description ==
=== Female ===
Female specimens are larger than males, with a body length of approximately 8.1 mm. The cephalothorax measures 2.7 mm in length and 2.1 mm in width. Females have slightly deeper abdominal markings compared to males, and all legs are pale yellow.

The female is morphologically close to E. calcarata and E. chimakothiensis from which could be distinguish by wider copulatory openings and insemination ducts jointed with spermatheca in sharp angle.

=== Male ===
Male specimens have a body length of approximately 5.6 mm, with the cephalothorax measuring 2.4 mm in length and 2.1 mm in width. The cephalothorax is brown with dark brown margins and features two orange-brown longitudinal bands extending from the anterior lateral eyes to the posterior end, bordered by white longitudinal bands covered with white setae. The eye region is surrounded by orange-yellow long setae, with sparse white setae in the center and dark brown setae on the posterior sides.

The chelicerae are brown with two teeth on the anterior margin and one tooth on the posterior margin. The first pair of legs is brown, while the remaining legs are pale yellow with sparse setae and short spines. The oval abdomen has a pale dorsal surface with two discontinuous light brown longitudinal bands in the center and dark brown discontinuous longitudinal markings on the margins.

The male pedipalp features a tibia with a short, wide ventral apophysis and a narrow, slightly curved retrolateral apophysis that appears H-shaped when viewed from different angles. The bulbus is longer than wide with a blunt lower end and contains a single tegular apophysis.
