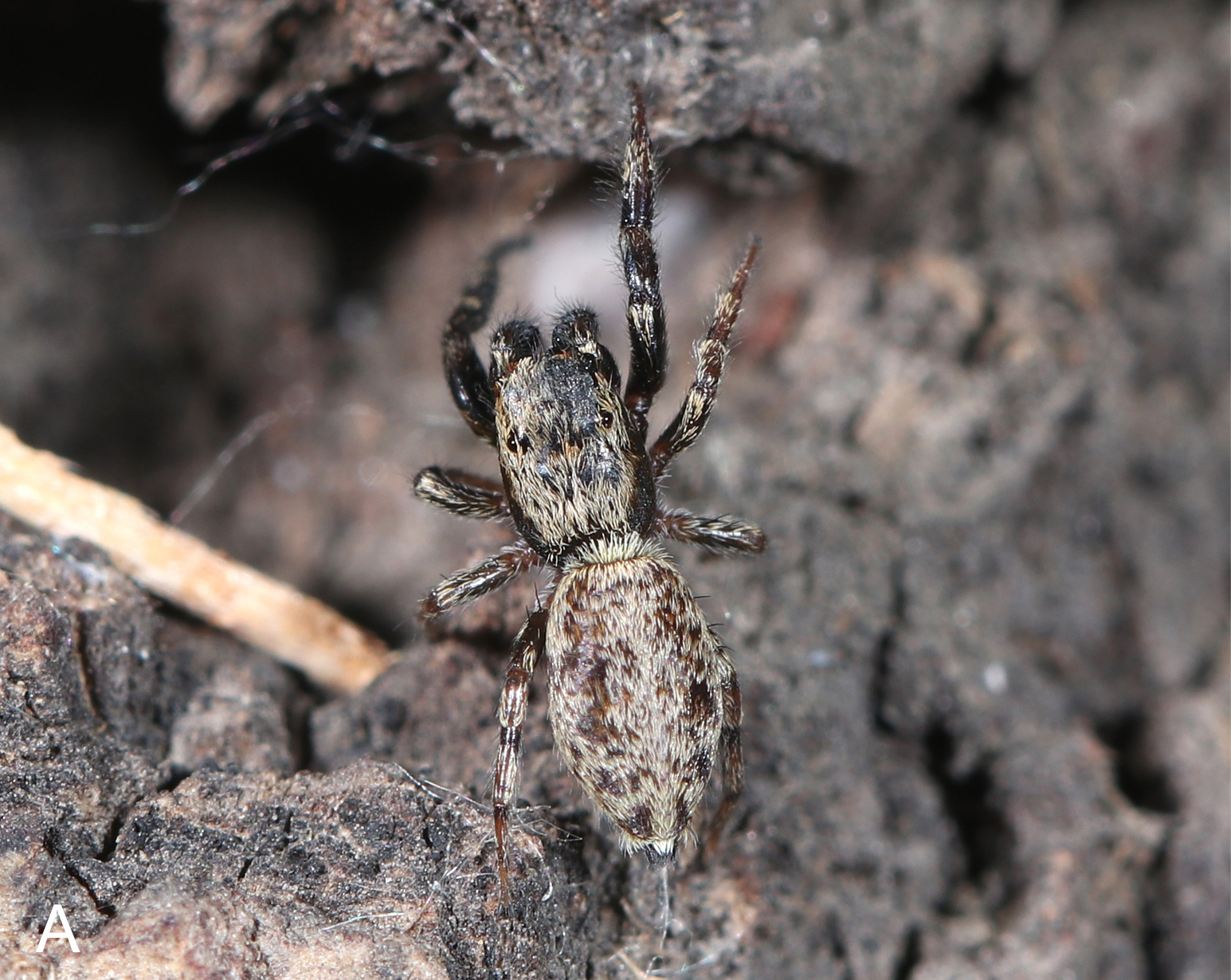
- An adult male

Scientific classification
- Kingdom: Animalia
- Phylum: Arthropoda
- Subphylum: Chelicerata
- Class: Arachnida
- Order: Araneae
- Infraorder: Araneomorphae
- Family: Salticidae
- Genus: Tasa
- Species: T. koreana

Binomial name
- Tasa koreana (Wesołowska, 1981)

Synonyms
- Pseudicius koreanus Wesołowska, 1981; Icius koreanus (Wesołowska, 1981); Tasa nipponica Bohdanowicz & Prószyński, 1987; Tasa koreanus (Wesołowska, 1981); Nepalicius koreanus (Wesołowska, 1981)

= Tasa koreana =

Species of jumping spider

Tasa koreana is a species of jumping spider that was first discovered in North Korea, after which it is named. It was subsequently found in China and Japan. A small spider, between 3.2 and 5 mm (0.13 and 0.20 in) long, it lives on tree trunks and branches. The female was first described in 1981 by the arachnologist Wanda Wesołowska. It has a dark brown or reddish-brown carapace, the upperside of the front part of its body, that has a dense covering of white hair. Behind this is a greyish-brown abdomen that has a pattern formed of dark brown and grey hairs. In some spiders these form chevrons; in others, they form stripes. First described in 1987, the male is mainly dark brown and has less hair than the female, although some spiders have a grey-white abdomen. Its copulatory organs are very similar to the related Tasa davidi. The male's copulatory organ has a spike that has a serrated edge. The female has a distinctive accessory gland internally. Originally described under the name Pseudicius koreanus, later authors transferred the species between several genera, and for a time male and female specimens were matched incorrectly. A 2014 revision linked the sexes and placed the species in the genus Tasa, which is the name generally used today.

== Taxonomy ==
Tasa koreana is a species of jumping spider, a member of the family Salticidae. The spider was first described by arachnologist Wanda Wesołowska in 1981. It is one of over 500 species identified by Wesołowska during her career, leading her to be one of the most prolific scientists in the field. She initially allocated it to the genus Pseudicius, first circumscribed by Eugène Simon in 1885, with the name Pseudicius koreanus, the specific epithet coming from the place where it was first discovered.

The spider has a complex taxonomic history. In the 1980s, it was noted that there were many similarities between species in Pseudicius and others in the genus Icius. Indeed, Ekaterina Andreeva, Stefania Hęciak and Jerzy Prószyński had looked to combine the genera in 1984. The two have similar spermathecal structure but work by Wayne Maddison in 1987 demonstrated that they have sufficiently different DNA to be considered different genera. In the specific case of Pseudicius koreanus there was sufficient similarity between the species and those in Icius that it was renamed Icius koreanus by Takeo Yaginuma in 1986. This was reinforced during the following year by Andrzej Bohdanowicz and Prószyński who particularly noted the similarity of the spider's cephalothorax, the forward part of its body, to others in the genus. They also described two new species at the same time. One was Icius tokarensis, which they said was similar to the male Icius koreanus in its white beard. Another was Tasa nipponica, the second member of the genus Tasa. Wesołowska had first circumscribed the genus in 1981.

The position of the two Icius species in that genus did not last long, however, and both were moved, in the case of Icius koreanus, back, to Pseudicius. Later reports repeatedly misidentified the male in particular, with several published records later reassigned to other species. After revising Japanese Pseudicius and Tasa, Tatsumi Suguro and Kensuke Yahata concluded that the female previously treated as Pseudicius koreanus corresponds to the male described as Tasa nipponica, while the 'male P. koreanus' of earlier authors belongs with Pseudicius tokaraensis. DNA sequencing supported this conclusion. Consequently they gave the combination of the female specimens that had previously been called Pseudicius koreanus and Icius koreanus, and the specimen called male Tasa nipponica a new name Tasa koreana. The remaining spiders were allocated to Pseudicius tokaraensis.

In 2015, Wayne Maddison allocated both Pseudicius and Tasa to the tribe Chrysillini the clade Saltafresia within the subfamily Salticoida. The tribe is monotypic. In 2016, Prószyński circumscribed a new genus that he named Nepalicius, based on the country Nepal and the genus Icius. He allocated the species to this genus with the name Nepalicius koreanus, reintegrating some of the spiders that had previously been allocated to Pseudicius tokaraensis.

In 2022, Chi Jin, Siyuan Liu, Lixin Wang, Manping Luo and Kai Chen collected specimens consistent with the pairing of the sexes by Tatsumi Suguro and Kensuke Yahata and re-validated the taxonomic status of the species, providing a re-description of Tasa koreanus. They also used the name Tasa koreana, which is the current name for the species. In 2017, Prószyński had allocated the genus Tasa to the Heliophanines group of genera, which he named after the genus Heliophanus. They are all small spiders that look similar, having a uniform external appearance, and live on vegetation or on the ground. In comparison, Pseudicius is a member of the Pseudiciines group of genera, named after the genus. They can be distinguished from other jumping spiders by their flattened and elongated body and characteristic colour patterns.

The species is known in Japanese as トサハエトリ (Tosa-haetori). It is also called the Korean flybird spider.

== Description ==
=== Male spider ===
Tasa are small spiders resemble members of the genera Helicius and Pseudicius in overall appearance but are separated by details of the copulatory organs. The male Tasa koreana is between 3.2 and 4.5 mm (0.13 and 0.18 in) in length. The spider's body is divided into two main parts: a forward cephalothorax and, behind that, an abdomen. Its carapace, the hard upper part of the cephalothorax, is between 1.56 and 1.9 mm (0.061 and 0.075 in) long and between 1.1 and 1.33 mm (0.043 and 0.052 in) wide. It is an elongated and flat shape. The dorsal surface is dark, with mixed pale and dark short hairs, or setae, rather than a bare cuticle. It has a short longitudinal fovea that is indistinct. The eye region is darker than the surrounding carapace and bordered by dark setae. The underside of the cephalothorax, or sternum, is dark brown. The part of its face known as its clypeus is also brown. Its mouthparts include its brown or dark brown chelicerae, which have two teeth at the front and one tooth at the back, its dark yellowish-brown or black labium, which is as wide as it is long, and dark brown or yellowish-brown maxillae.

The male has an abdomen that is between 1.7 and 2.28 mm (0.067 and 0.090 in) long and between 0.98 and 1.38 mm (0.039 and 0.054 in) wide. It is a grey-white or dark brown oval that is covered in many white and a few black hairs. Some specimens have been found with two faint light brown stripes running down the top. It has brown or greyish-brown spinnerets that are used to spin webs. While its front legs are entirely dark brown, its remaining legs are yellowish-brown with patches that are darker. Its pedipalps, sensory organs near its mouth, are brown.

The male's copulatory organs include a smooth cymbium and palpal bulb, the latter marked by a small projection about halfway down, that are similar in size. The palpal bulb blends into a rather thick hooked embolus at the top. The palpal tibia is small and has a spike, or apophysis, that looks like a kitchen knife with a serrated edge. At the base of the tibial apophysis is a number of other smaller spikes.

=== Female spider ===
The female Tasa koreana is between 3.2 and 5 mm (0.13 and 0.20 in) in length. It has an elongate and flat carapace that is between 1.66 and 1.8 mm (0.065 and 0.071 in) long and between 1.13 and 1.25 mm (0.044 and 0.049 in) wide. It is generally dark brown or reddish-brown and has a complete covering of dense white hairs, apart from its eye field, which is dark brown and surrounded with black hairs like the male. Its sternum is greyish- or yellowish-brown. Its clypeus is brown and has white hairs. Its mouthparts are brown, often a brighter shade, particularly its maxillae.

The female's greyish-brown abdomen is between 1.95 and 2.8 mm (0.077 and 0.110 in) long and between 1.25 and 1.63 mm (0.049 and 0.064 in) wide. The top of its abdomen is covered in dense dark brown and grey hairs, the latter forming a pattern of chevrons running down the middle towards the back or of stripes similar to, but darker than, those found on the male. The bottom of its abdomen is covered in grey hairs. There are no sclerites on it. Its spinnerets are greyish- or yellowish-brown. Its legs are mainly light yellow or yellowish-white with some specimens having yellowish-brown and brown markings. Its pedipalps are bright brown or yellow.

The female's epigyne, the external visible part of its copulatory organs, is medium sized and shows evidence of sclerotization. It has two oval openings that lead to S-shaped insemination ducts. The spermathecae, or receptacles, at the end of the ducts are similarly S-shaped and have long spines on their inside walls. They also show evidence of sclerotization. Internally, there is a distinctive oval accessory gland. Its copulatory organs are almost identical to the related Tasa davidi.

== Distribution and habitat ==
Tasa koreana is distributed across China, Japan and Korea. The female holotype was found near Pyongyang in North Korea in 1959. It has subsequently been seen living on both the islands of Honshu and Shikoku in Japan. In China, it has been found in Hebei and Zhejiang. It lives on tree trunks and branches.
