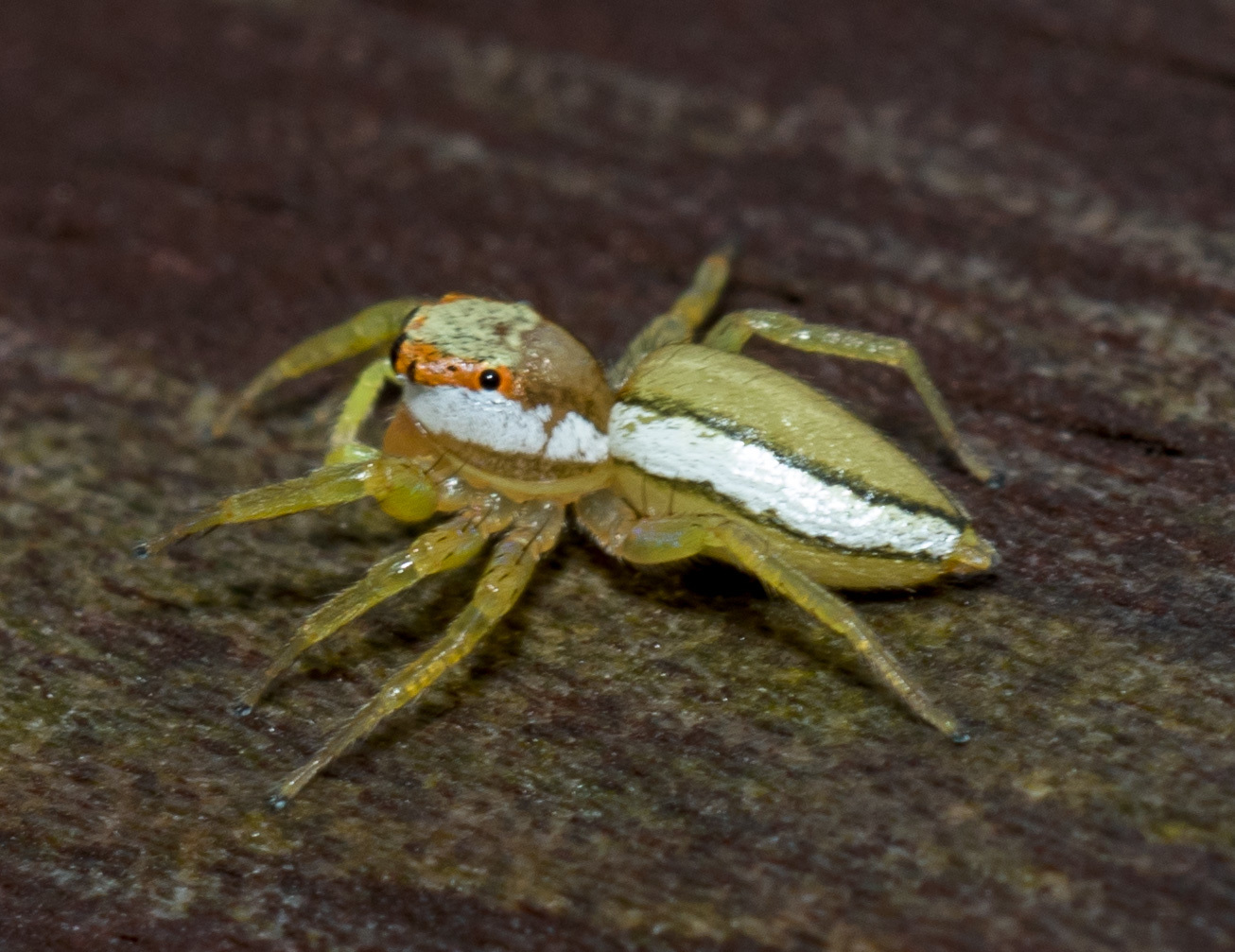
- female from Hong Kong
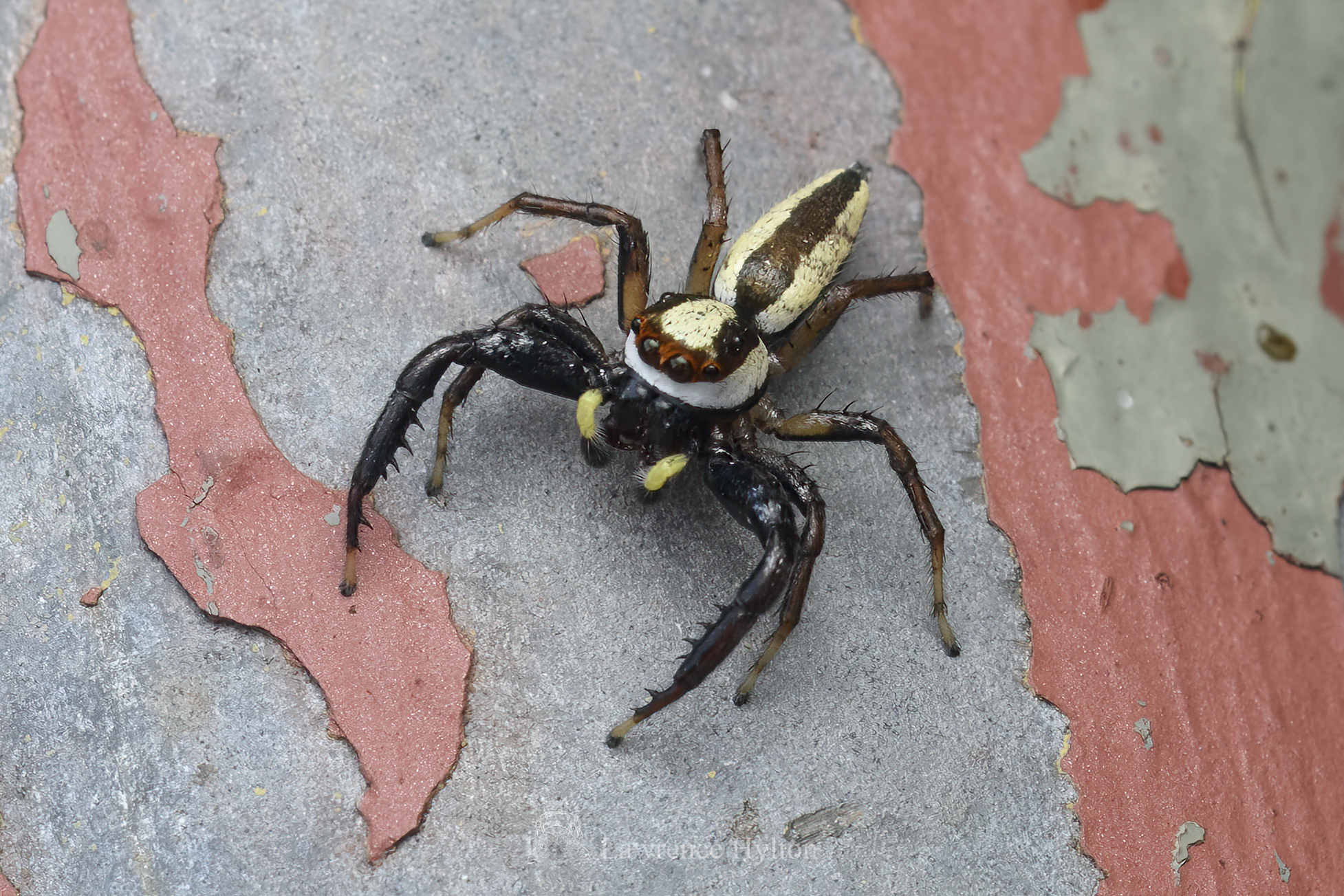
- male from Hong Kong

Scientific classification
- Kingdom: Animalia
- Phylum: Arthropoda
- Subphylum: Chelicerata
- Class: Arachnida
- Order: Araneae
- Infraorder: Araneomorphae
- Family: Salticidae
- Genus: Epocilla
- Species: E. blairei

Binomial name
- Epocilla blairei Żabka, 1985

= Epocilla blairei =

Species of jumping spider

Epocilla blairei is a species of jumping spider in the genus Epocilla. It was first described in 1985 by Polish arachnologist Marek Żabka based on specimens from Vietnam. The species is distributed from Taiwan to Vietnam.

== Taxonomy ==
Epocilla blairei was described by Marek Żabka in 1985 as part of his comprehensive systematic study of jumping spiders from Vietnam. The species belongs to the genus Epocilla, which was established by Tamerlan Thorell in 1887. The genus Epocilla is part of the tribe Chrysillini within the family Salticidae.

The holotype male and allotype female were originally identified as "Epocilla aurantiaca Snr., Tonkin, (BLAIRE)" and are deposited in the Muséum national d'histoire naturelle in Paris. The species was initially confused with Epocilla aurantiaca, having been misidentified by Eugène Simon in earlier collections.

== Distribution ==
Epocilla blairei has been recorded from Taiwan to Vietnam. It has also been observed in Thailand.

== Description ==
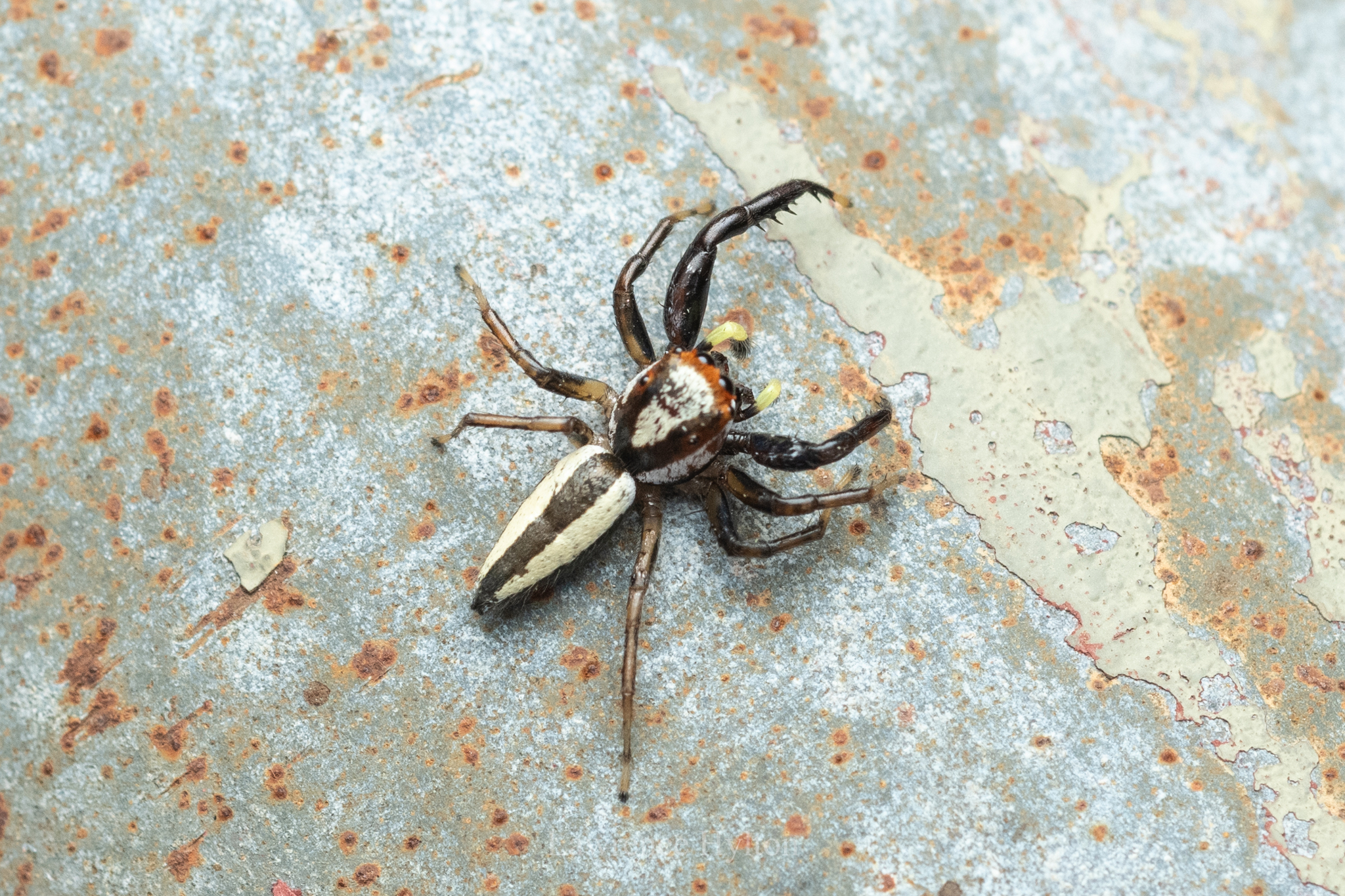
male from Hong Kong

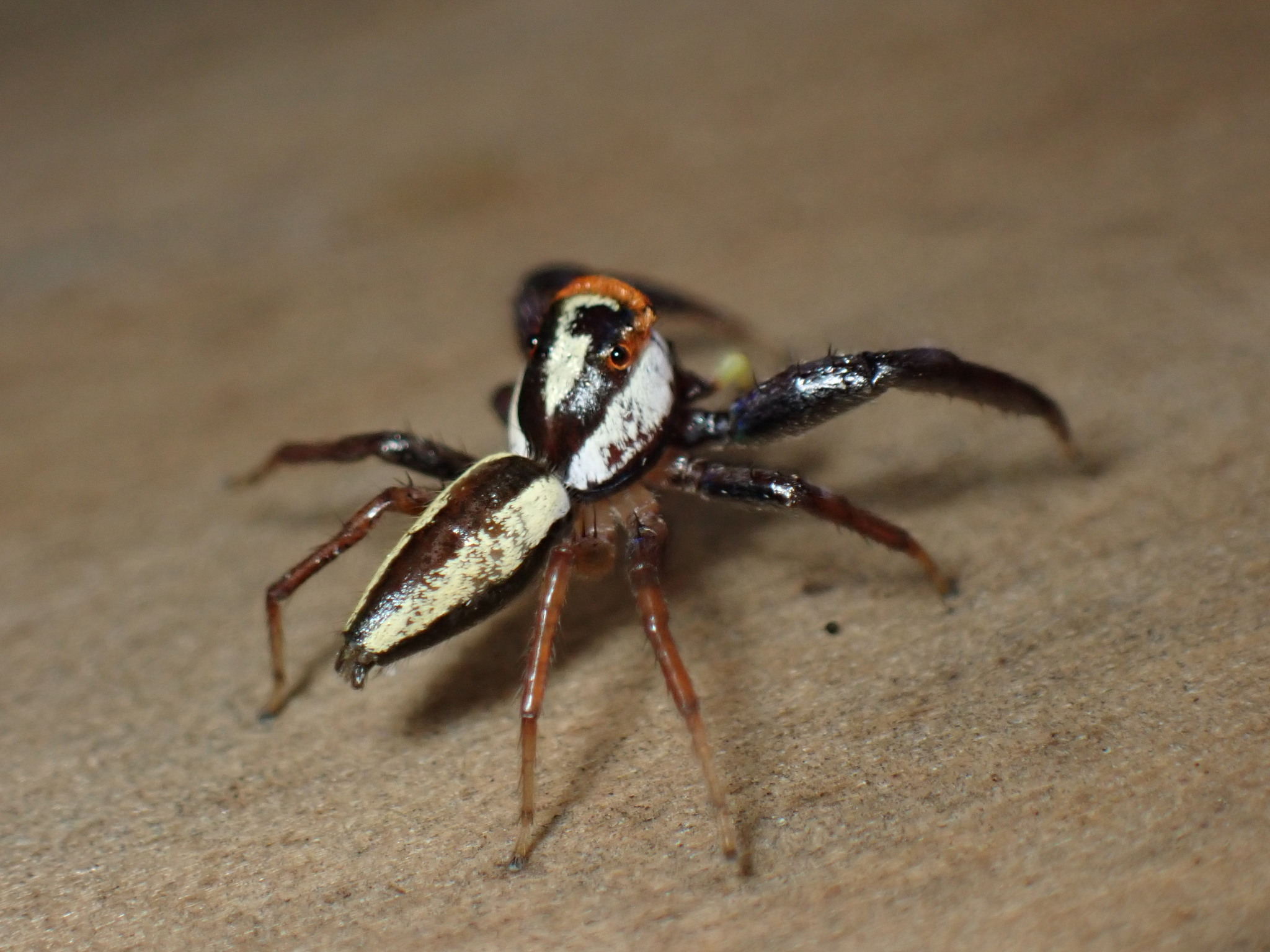
male from Hong Kong

The species exhibits the characteristic features of the genus Epocilla. Males possess distinctive palpal organs with a double tibial apophysis, a rounded outgrowth on the bulbus surface, and a long, broad, sinuous embolus. Females have an epigyne with an oval incision on the side of the epigastric furrow, oval spermathecae, well-developed accessory glands and fertilization canals, and copulatory canals that are not visible, distinguishing it from related species.
