= Heliophanillus conspiciendus =

Scientific classification
- Kingdom: Animalia
- Phylum: Arthropoda
- Subphylum: Chelicerata
- Class: Arachnida
- Order: Araneae
- Infraorder: Araneomorphae
- Family: Salticidae
- Genus: Heliophanillus
- Species: H. conspiciendus

Binomial name
- Heliophanillus conspiciendus Wesołowska & van Harten, 2010

Species of spider

Heliophanillus conspiciendus is a jumping spider species in the genus Heliophanillus that lives in the United Arab Emirates. The male was first described in 2010.
