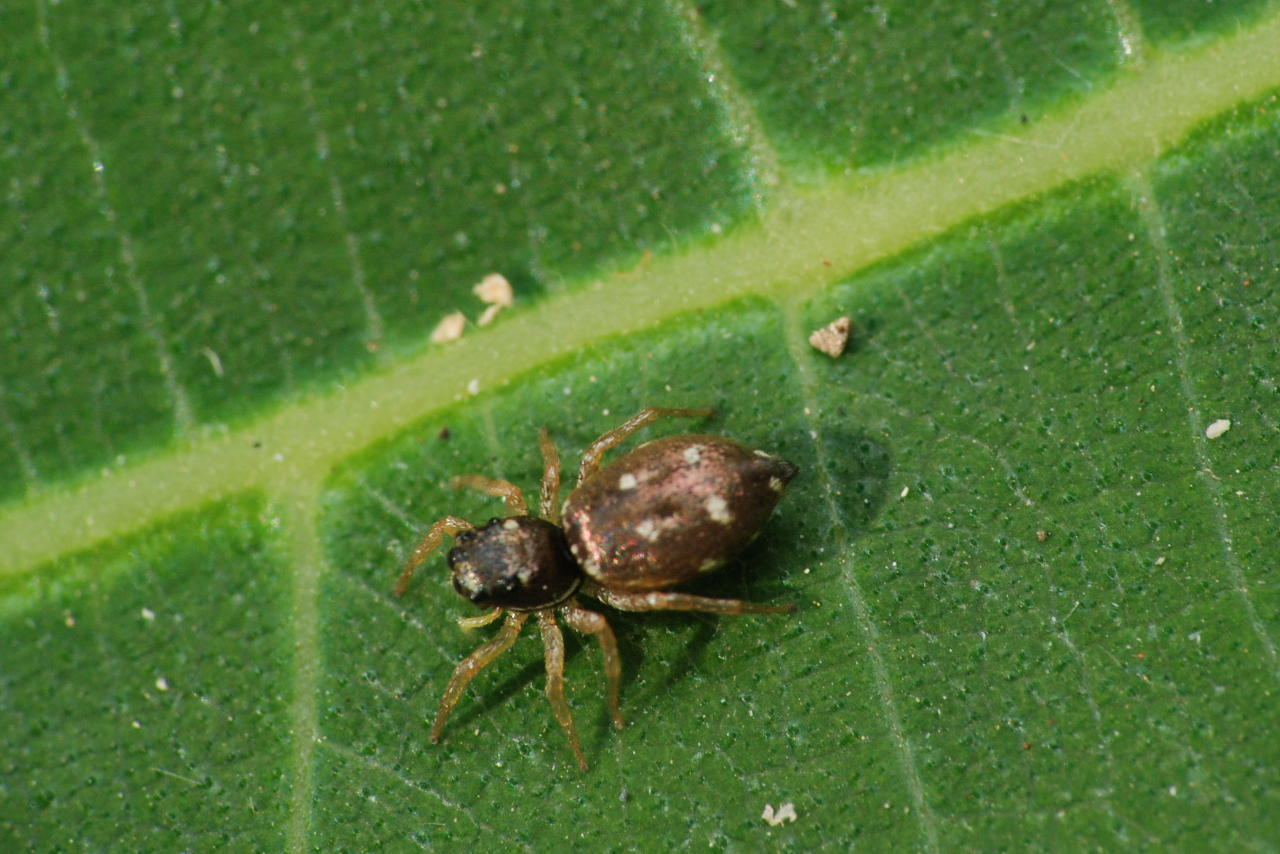

Scientific classification
- Kingdom: Animalia
- Phylum: Arthropoda
- Subphylum: Chelicerata
- Class: Arachnida
- Order: Araneae
- Infraorder: Araneomorphae
- Family: Salticidae
- Genus: Heliophanillus
- Species: H. fulgens

Binomial name
- Heliophanillus fulgens (O. P-Cambridge, 1872)

= Heliophanillus fulgens =

Species of spider

Heliophanillus fulgens is a jumping spider species in the genus Heliophanillus that can be found in a large distribution that extends from Greece to Central Asia. The species, which was first described in 1872, was originally named Salticus fulgens, but was later placed successively in the genera Euophrys and Icius before the current name was agreed in 1989. The spider is small, ranging in body length between 2.25 and 3.3 millimetres (0.09 and 0.13 in), the female being larger than the male. It is rusty brown with white hairs and primarily lives around the Eastern Mediterranean from Greece into North Africa and Asia.

== Taxonomy ==
The species was first described in 1872 by Octavius Pickard-Cambridge and named Salticus fulgens, in the genus Salticus. In 1876, Eugène Simon named a spider in the Euophrys as Euophrys fulgens, but then subsequently described the same spider in 1890, in its female form, and 1901, in its male form, but named Heliophanus lucipeta. In 1986, Wanda Wesołowska transferred Heliophanus lucipeta to the species Pseudicius. In 1988, Wesołowska transferred both species to the genus Icius as Icius fulgens and Icius lucipeta respectively. The following year, Jerzy Prószyński transferred them to the genus Heliophanillus and described another spider species, although the male only, called Heliophanillus arabicus. In 1994, this new species was recognised as a synonym of Heliophanus fulgens and, finally, in 2007, Heliophanillus lucipeta was also named as a synonym of the species.

== Description ==
Heliophanillus fulgens is a small jumping spider. It is rusty brown with white hairs and clear orange-brown iridescent scales. The male is between 2.25 and 2.9 millimetres (0.09 and 0.11 in) in body length, while the female is larger, typically with a body 3.3 millimetres (0.13 in) long.

== Distribution ==
Heliophanillus fulgens can be found in a large distribution that extends from Greece into Central Asia and North Africa, including Iran, Libya, and Turkey. The spider mainly lives in the area around the Eastern Mediterranean, but has also been identified as far east as Afghanistan.
