= Augustaea =

Scientific classification
- Kingdom: Animalia
- Phylum: Arthropoda
- Subphylum: Chelicerata
- Class: Arachnida
- Order: Araneae
- Infraorder: Araneomorphae
- Family: Salticidae
- Genus: Augustaea; Szombathy, 1915
- Species: A. formicaria

Binomial name
- Augustaea formicaria Szombathy, 1915

Genus of spiders

Augustaea is a monotypic genus of ant-like Singaporean jumping spiders containing the single species, Augustaea formicaria. It was first described by C. Szombathy in 1915, and is only found in Singapore. They are about 6 millimetres (0.24 in) long, and placed close to Agorius.

Szombathy's drawings suggest that A. formicaria might belong to Orsima, but no study has been published on it since its first description in 1915.
