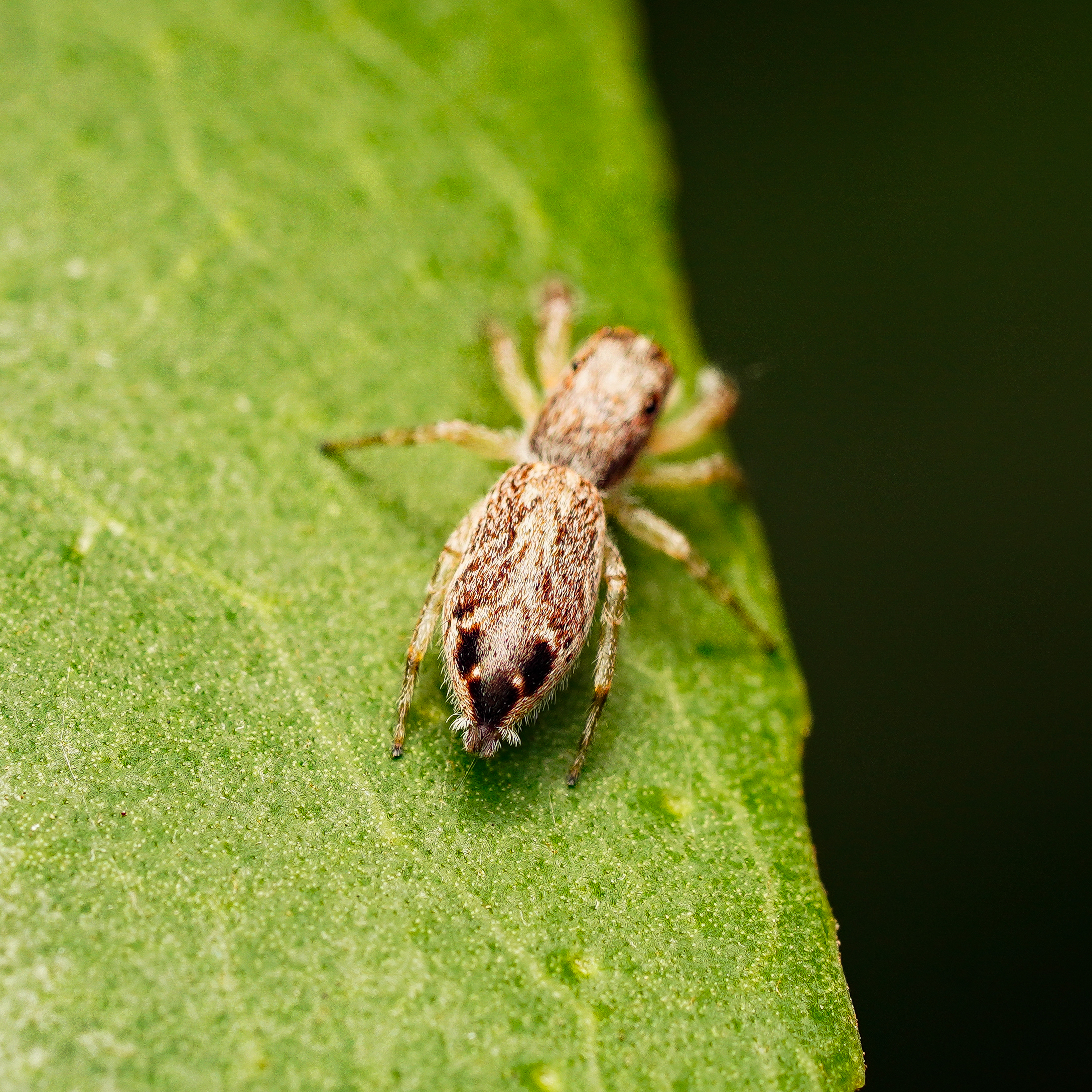
- Okinawicius tekdi female from Pune, Maharashtra, India

Scientific classification
- Kingdom: Animalia
- Phylum: Arthropoda
- Subphylum: Chelicerata
- Class: Arachnida
- Order: Araneae
- Infraorder: Araneomorphae
- Family: Salticidae
- Genus: Okinawicius
- Species: O. tekdi

Binomial name
- Okinawicius tekdi Tripathi & Kulkarni 2024

= Okinawicius tekdi =

Species of spiders

Okinawicius tekdi is a species of spiders in the family Salticidae. It was described in 2024 by Tripathi & Kulkarni from Pune city in Maharashtra state of India.

== Etymology ==
The specific epithet is a noun apposition, derived from the Marathi word 'tekdi' that translates to 'hill' in English, as a tribute to the geographical origin of the specimen and to highlight the need for conservation of flora and fauna of the unique urban hills of Pune city and similar habitats of tropical countries.
