= Okinawicius daitaricus =

Scientific classification
- Kingdom: Animalia
- Phylum: Arthropoda
- Subphylum: Chelicerata
- Class: Arachnida
- Order: Araneae
- Infraorder: Araneomorphae
- Family: Salticidae
- Genus: Okinawicius
- Species: O. daitaricus

Binomial name
- Okinawicius daitaricus (Prószyński, 1992)

Synonyms
- Pseudicius daitaricus

Species of spiders

Okinawicius daitaricus is a species of spiders in the family Salticidae. It was described in 1992 by J. Prószyński. Type specimen was from Daitari in Jajpur-Keonjahr district, Orissa state of India.

== Distribution ==
Only known from India.
