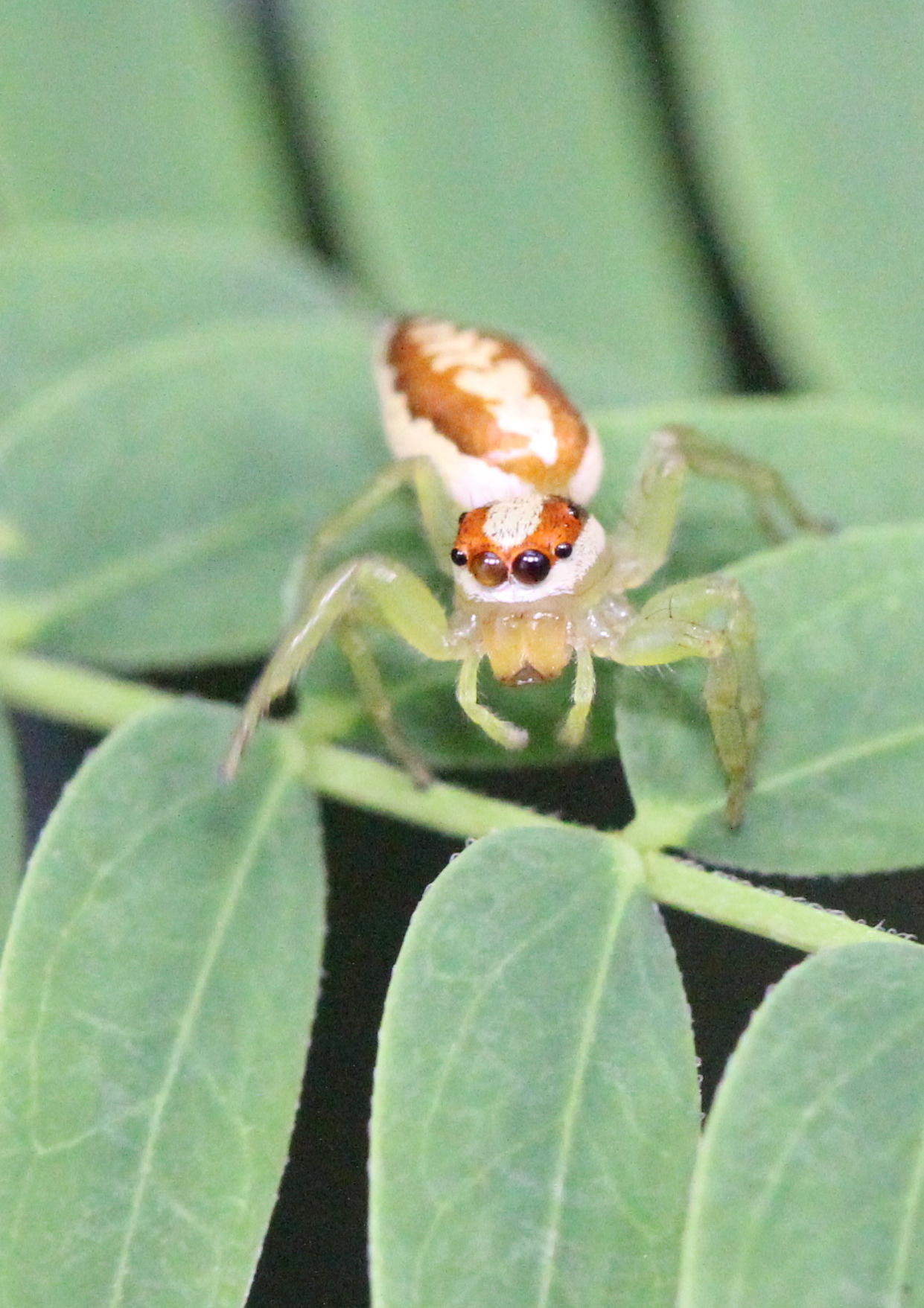
- female from Hong Kong
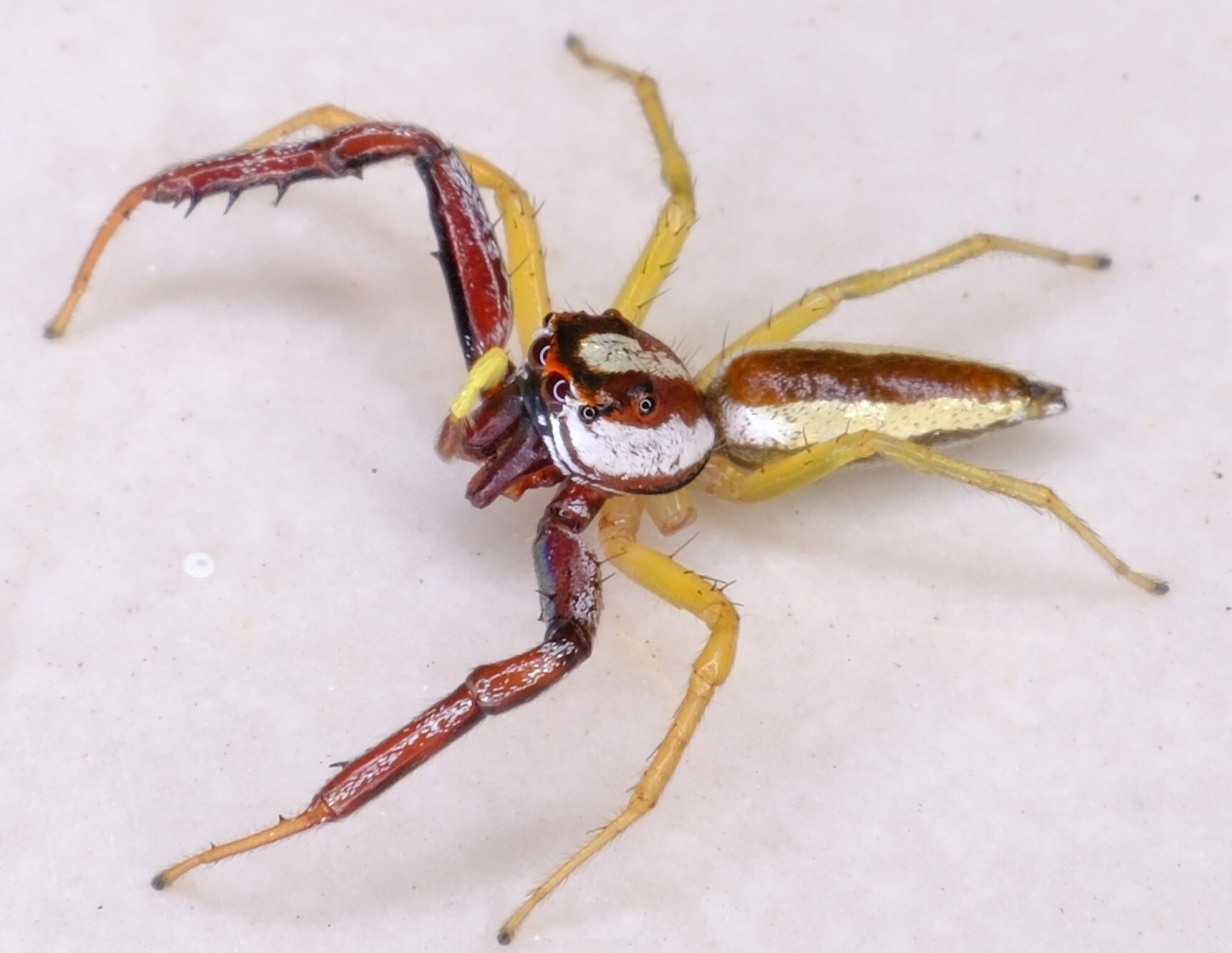
- male from Singapore

Scientific classification
- Kingdom: Animalia
- Phylum: Arthropoda
- Subphylum: Chelicerata
- Class: Arachnida
- Order: Araneae
- Infraorder: Araneomorphae
- Family: Salticidae
- Genus: Epocilla
- Species: E. calcarata

Binomial name
- Epocilla calcarata (Karsch, 1880)

Synonyms
- Plexippus calcaratus Karsch, 1880; Goajara crassipes Peckham & Peckham, 1907; Marpissa kalapani Tikader, 1977; Epocilla rufa Wesołowska, 1981

= Epocilla calcarata =

Species of jumping spider

Epocilla calcarata is a species of jumping spider of the genus Epocilla. It has a wide distribution across Asia, from India and China to Indonesia (Sulawesi), and has been introduced to the Seychelles and Hawaii.

== Taxonomy ==
The species was originally described as Plexippus calcaratus by Ferdinand Karsch in 1880. It was later transferred to the genus Epocilla by Marek Żabka in 1985, who also synonymized several other species names with it.

The species has a complex taxonomic history, with several names now considered synonyms. Goajara crassipes was described by George and Elizabeth Peckham in 1907, Marpissa kalapani by B. K. Tikader in 1977, and Epocilla rufa by Wanda Wesołowska in 1981.

== Distribution ==
E. calcarata has a broad distribution across Asia. It is native to India, China, and extends to Indonesia, specifically Sulawesi. The species has been introduced to the Seychelles islands and is also present in East Africa and Hawaii.

== Description ==
E. calcarata is a medium-sized jumping spider. Males have an elongated cephalothorax that is yellow with dark brown margins, with the eyes surrounded by black markings and two rusty streaks running from the third row of eyes toward the abdomen. The cephalothorax length ranges from 2.56 to 2.78 mm in males. The abdomen is elongated and greenish-grey with a broad rusty median streak, measuring 3.89 to 4.00 mm in length.

The first pair of legs in males is robust and rusty-colored, with a row of spines on the tibia and two longitudinal brown streaks on the femur. The remaining legs are yellow. The male pedipalp is small and yellow, featuring a single tibial process and a short, truncated embolus.

Females have similar cephalothorax coloration to males, measuring about 2.67 mm in length. The female abdomen is rusty-colored with a yellow, leaf-like spot in the center and measures 3.33 mm in length. The legs are uniformly yellow in females. The epigyne is of medium size with a deeply carved posterior margin and two oval copulatory openings.
