= Heliophanillus =

Scientific classification
- Kingdom: Animalia
- Phylum: Arthropoda
- Subphylum: Chelicerata
- Class: Arachnida
- Order: Araneae
- Infraorder: Araneomorphae
- Family: Salticidae
- Subfamily: Salticinae
- Genus: Heliophanillus; Prószyński, 1989

Type species
- Salticus fulgens O. P-Cambridge, 1872

Species
- See text.

Genus of spiders

Heliophanillus is a genus of the spider family Salticidae (jumping spiders).

H. lucipeta was synonymized with H. fulgens in 2007.

== Species ==
As of May 2017, the World Spider Catalog lists the following species in the genus:

- Heliophanillus conspiciendus Wesołowska & van Harten, 2010 – United Arab Emirates
- Heliophanillus fulgens (O. P.-Cambridge, 1872) – Greece to Central Asia
- Heliophanillus metallifer Wesołowska & van Harten, 2010 – United Arab Emirates
- Heliophanillus suedicola (Simon, 1901) – Yemen, Socotra
