= Matagaia =

Scientific classification
- Kingdom: Animalia
- Phylum: Arthropoda
- Subphylum: Chelicerata
- Class: Arachnida
- Order: Araneae
- Infraorder: Araneomorphae
- Family: Salticidae
- Genus: Matagaia
- Species: M. chromatopus

Binomial name
- Matagaia chromatopus Ruiz, Brescovit & Freitas, 2007

Genus of spiders

Matagaia is a genus of jumping spiders. Its only species, M. chromatopus, was only found on Fernando de Noronha Island, an isolated group of volcanic islands located in the South Equatorial Atlantic, about 350 km from the nearest Brazilian mainland.

== Description ==
M. chromatopus is similar to the genus Icius in general appearance, sexual dimorphism and male palp structure. Females are almost 5 mm long, with males less than 4 mm.

== Name ==
The species name refers to the male leg coloration, and is said to be derived from ancient Greek chromos "color" and pus "foot". Ιn ancient Greek, "color" and "foot" are respectively chrōma (χρῶμα, genitive χρῶματος) and pous (πούς).
