= Plesiopiuka =

Scientific classification
- Kingdom: Animalia
- Phylum: Arthropoda
- Subphylum: Chelicerata
- Class: Arachnida
- Order: Araneae
- Infraorder: Araneomorphae
- Family: Salticidae
- Genus: Plesiopiuka; Ruiz, 2010
- Species: P. simplex

Binomial name
- Plesiopiuka simplex Ruiz, 2010

Genus of spiders

Plesiopiuka is a monotypic genus of Brazilian jumping spiders containing the single species, Plesiopiuka simplex. It was first described by G. R. S. Ruiz in 2010, and is only found in Brazil.
