= Echinussa =

Scientific classification
- Kingdom: Animalia
- Phylum: Arthropoda
- Subphylum: Chelicerata
- Class: Arachnida
- Order: Araneae
- Infraorder: Araneomorphae
- Family: Salticidae
- Subfamily: Salticinae
- Genus: Echinussa; Simon, 1901

Type species
- E. vibrabunda (Simon, 1886)

Species
- E. imerinensis Simon, 1901 – Madagascar; E. praedatoria (Keyserling, 1877) – Madagascar; E. vibrabunda (Simon, 1886) – Madagascar

Genus of spiders

Echinussa is a genus of Malagasy jumping spiders that was first described by Eugène Louis Simon in 1901. As of June 2019 it contains only three species, found only on Madagascar: E. imerinensis, E. praedatoria, and E. vibrabunda.
