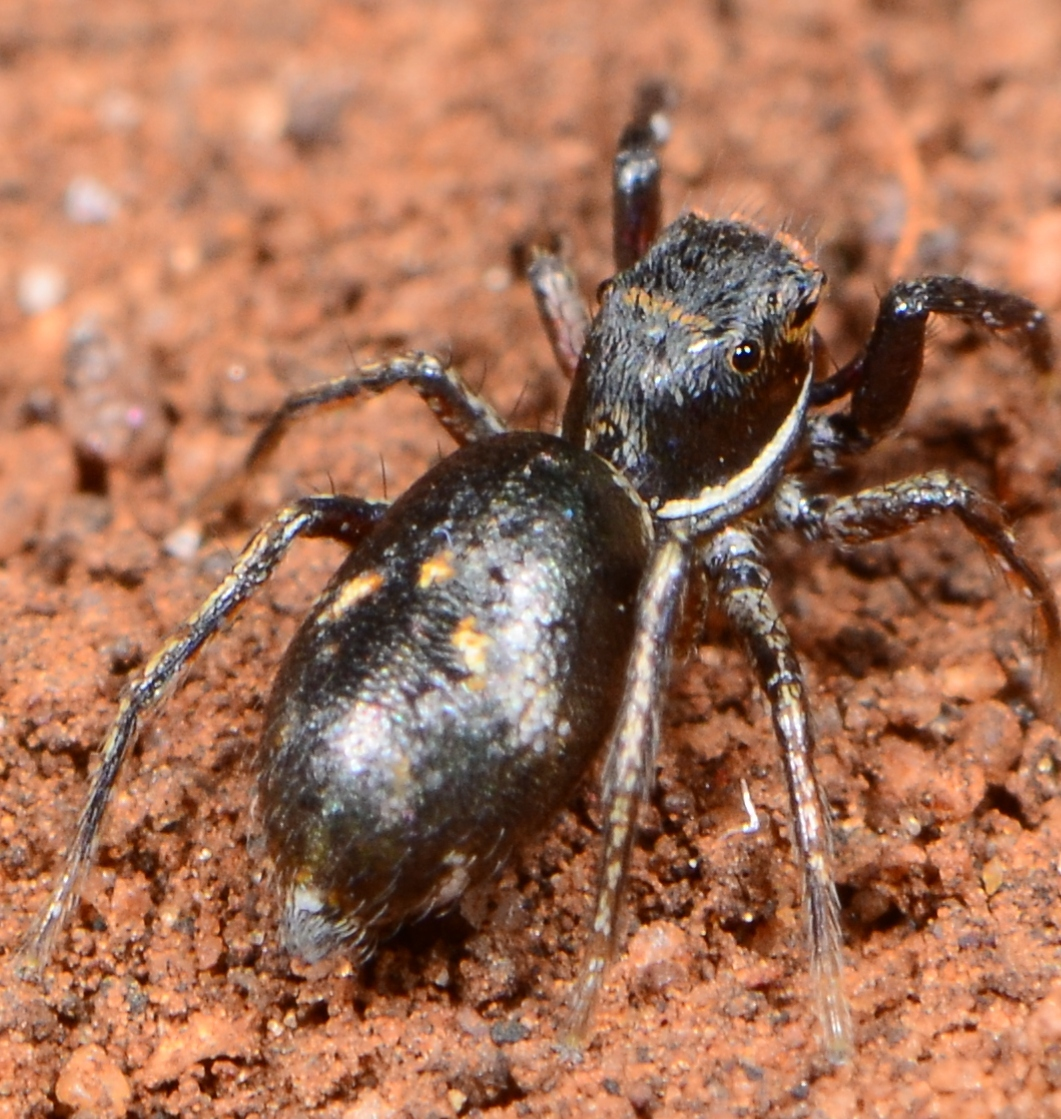
- female N. chionogaster
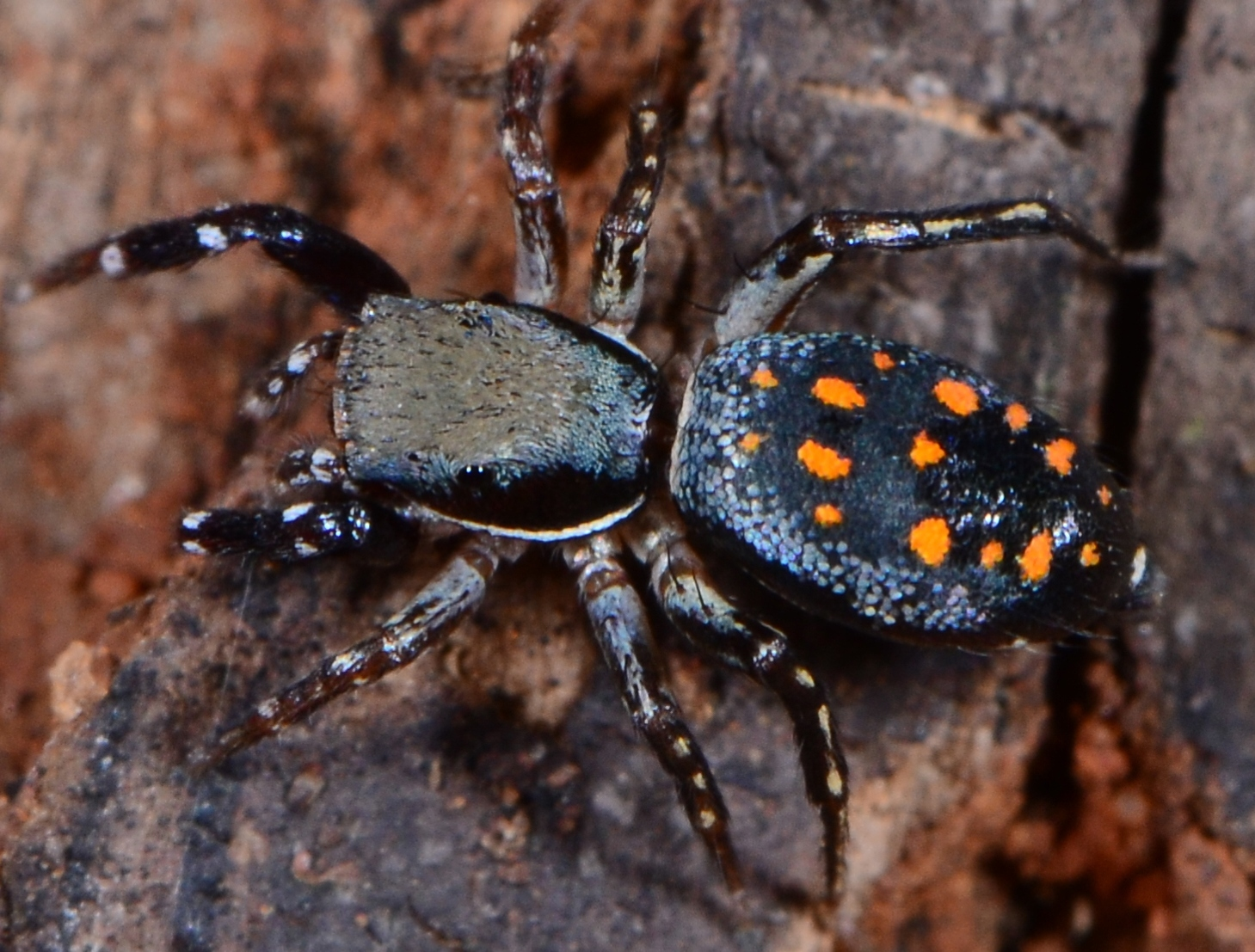
- female N. horizontalis

Scientific classification
- Kingdom: Animalia
- Phylum: Arthropoda
- Subphylum: Chelicerata
- Class: Arachnida
- Order: Araneae
- Infraorder: Araneomorphae
- Family: Salticidae
- Subfamily: Salticinae
- Genus: Natta; Karsch, 1879

Type species
- N. horizontalis Karsch, 1879

Species
- see text

Synonyms
- Cyllobelus Simon, 1885

= Natta (spider) =

Genus of spiders

Natta is a genus of jumping spiders that was first described by Ferdinand Anton Franz Karsch in 1879. The described species are found in Africa and Yemen.

== Species ==
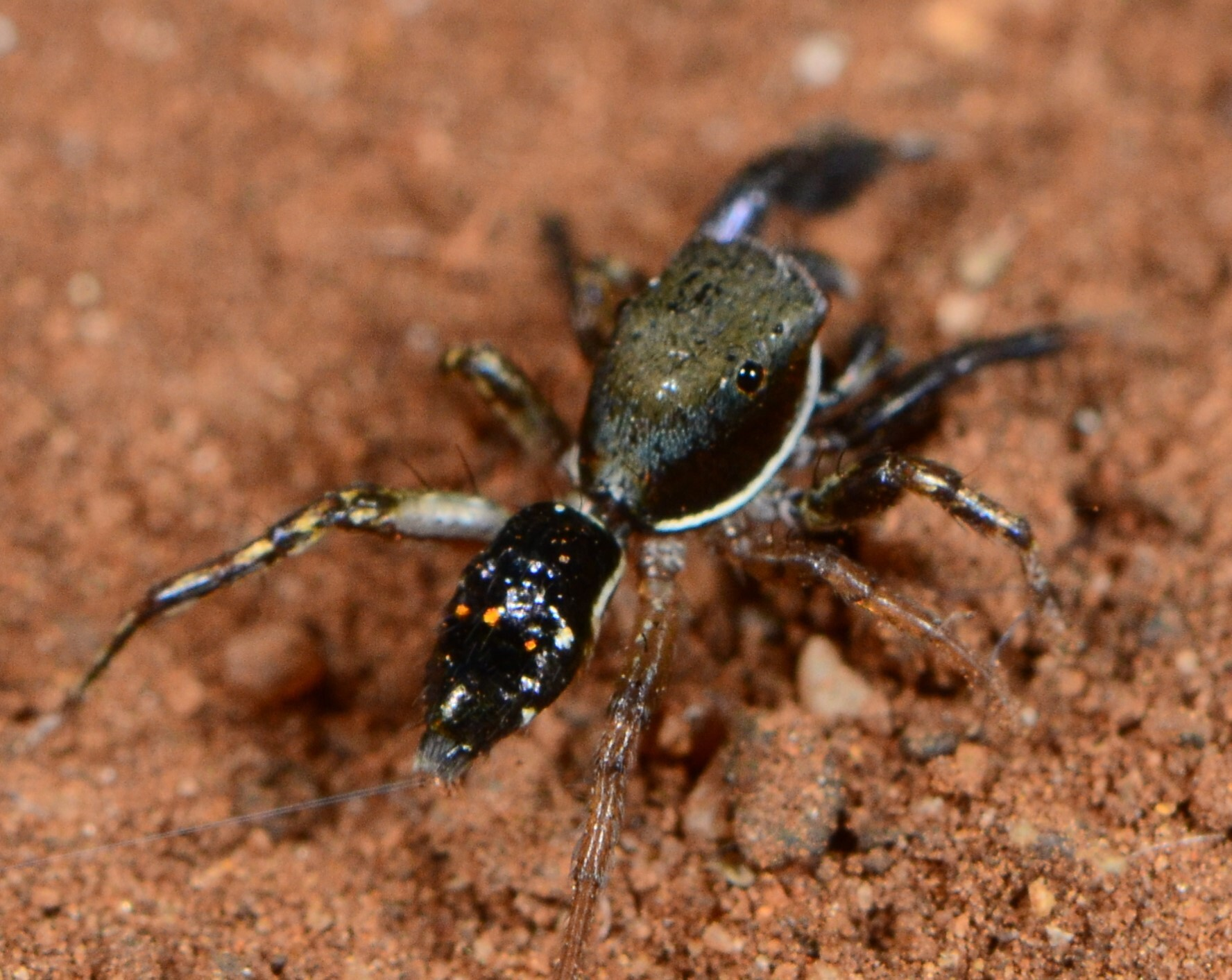
male N. chionogaster

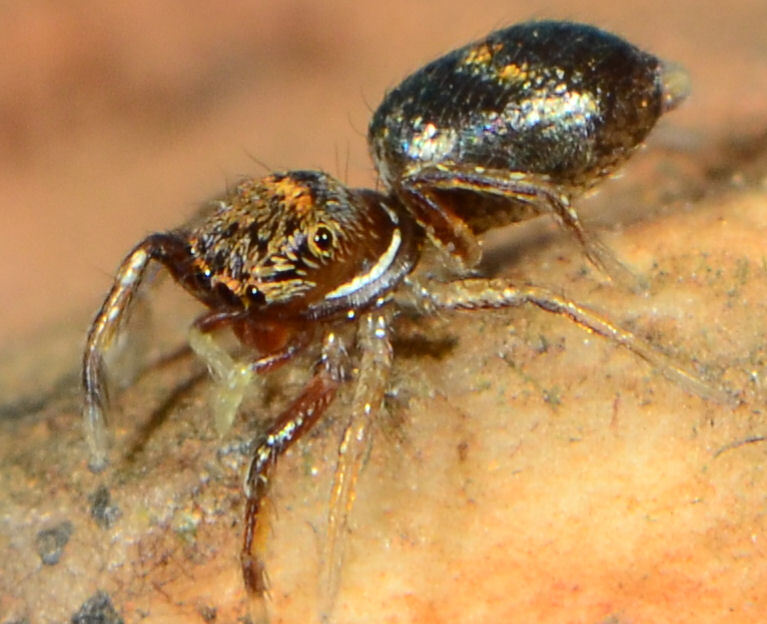
juvenile male N. horizontalis

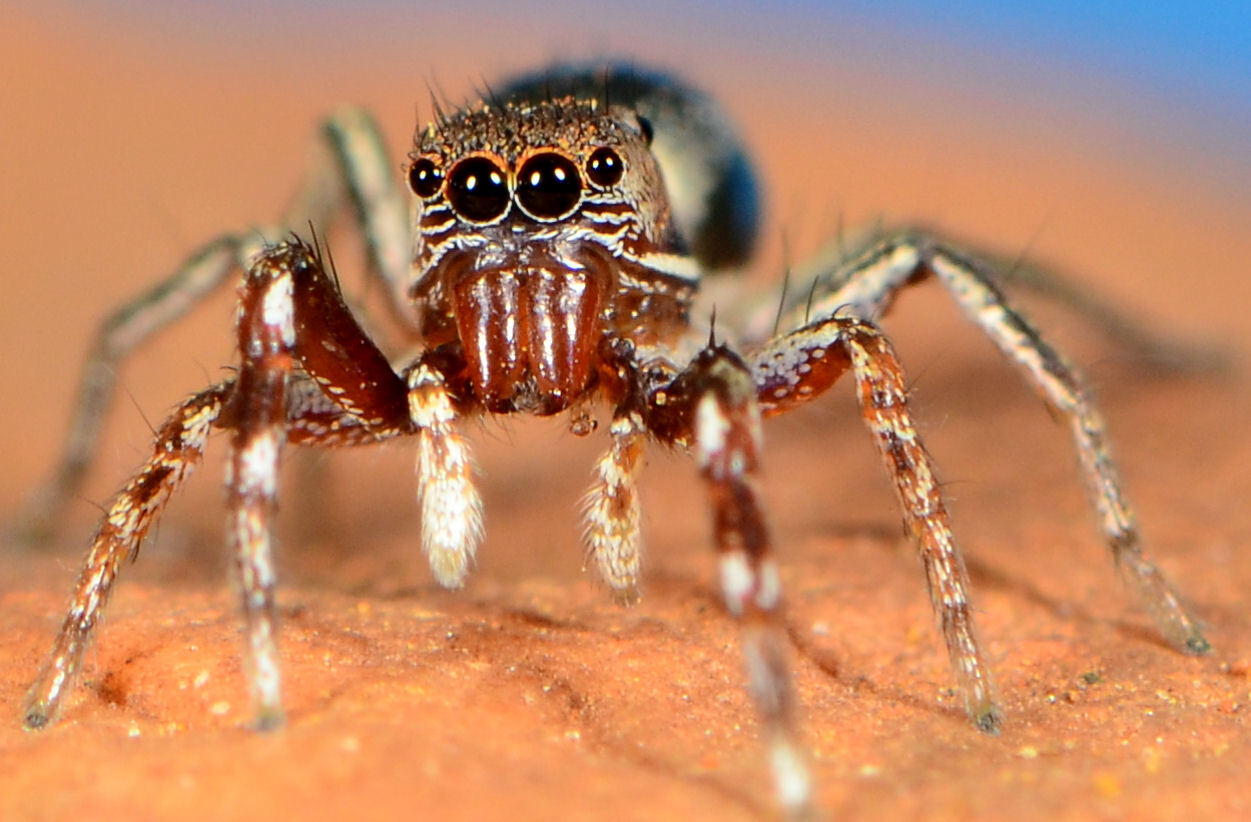
juvenile male N. horizontalis

As of October 2025, this genus includes three species:

- Natta chionogaster (Simon, 1901) – Guinea, Ivory Coast, Ghana, Tropical Africa, Namibia, South Africa, Madagascar
- Natta horizontalis Karsch, 1879 – Africa, Yemen (type species)
- Natta triguttata Haddad & Wesołowska, 2024 – South Africa
