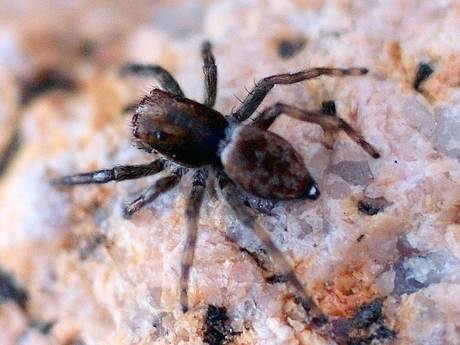

Scientific classification
- Kingdom: Animalia
- Phylum: Arthropoda
- Subphylum: Chelicerata
- Class: Arachnida
- Order: Araneae
- Infraorder: Araneomorphae
- Family: Salticidae
- Subfamily: Salticinae
- Genus: Hakka; Berry & Prószyński, 2001
- Species: H. himeshimensis

Binomial name
- Hakka himeshimensis (Dönitz & Strand), 1906)

Synonyms
- Icius himeshimensis; Menemerus himeshimensis; Pseudicius himeshimensis; Salticus koreanus

= Hakka himeshimensis =

Species of spider

Hakka himeshimensis is a species of the spider family Salticidae (jumping spiders). H. himeshimensis is native to East Asia, but it has been introduced to the United States. The species is most commonly found in rocky coastal habitats.

== Description ==
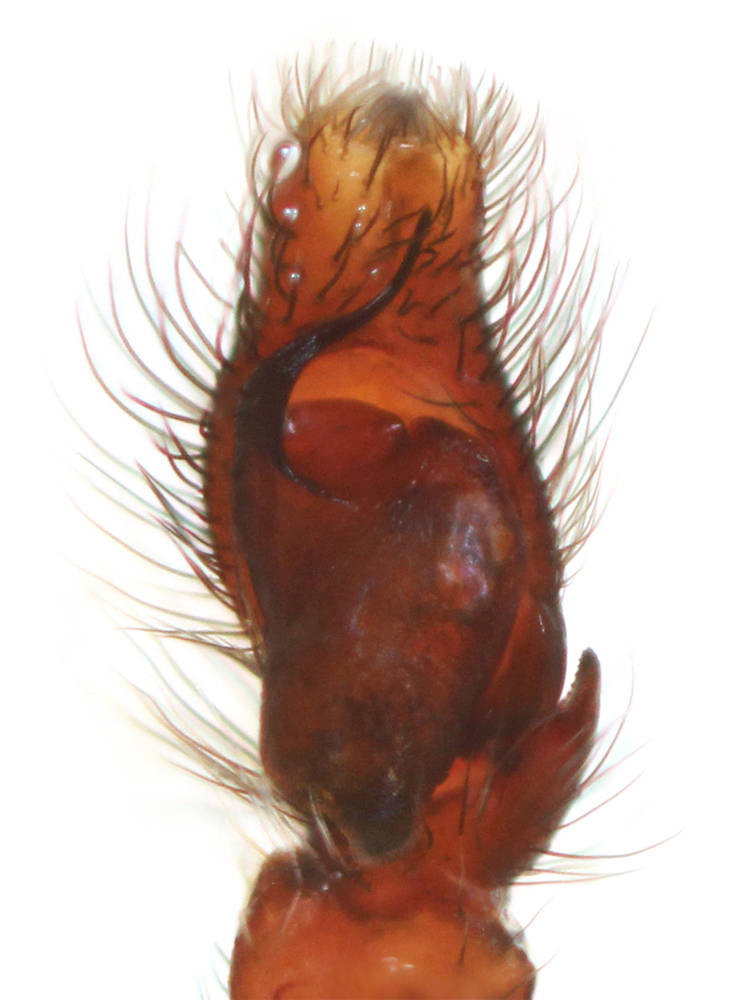
Palpal organ of male Hakka himeshimensis

Both sexes have a body length of about 7 mm. The body and legs are uniformly dark brown. The body is covered with sparse lighter hairs. Between the eyes there are longer, reddish hairs that stand up diagonally. The chelicerae are brown and robust.

== Distribution ==
Hakka himeshimensis occurs in China, North Korea, Japan, Hawaii, and the Eastern United States. It is not clear if there is a viable population in Hawaii, or if the found specimens represent incidental recent arrivals (although three specimens were collected over a period of 74 years). It is likely that the species was accidentally introduced to the Eastern United States by maritime shipping.

== Name ==
The genus name is derived from Hakka, a Chinese people with 70 million worldwide. Many members were brought to Hawaii as laborers on sugar cane plantations in the middle of the 19th century. This is probably a reference to the species' origin in Asia.
