= Kupiuka =

Scientific classification
- Kingdom: Animalia
- Phylum: Arthropoda
- Subphylum: Chelicerata
- Class: Arachnida
- Order: Araneae
- Infraorder: Araneomorphae
- Family: Salticidae
- Subfamily: Salticinae
- Genus: Kupiuka; Ruiz

Type species
- Kupiuka extratheca

Species
- 8, see text

Genus of spiders

Kupiuka is a genus of spiders in the family Salticidae. It was first described in 2010 by Ruiz. As of 2017, it contains 8 species, all of which live in Brazil.

== Species ==
Kupiuka comprises the following species:

- Kupiuka adisi Ruiz, 2010
- Kupiuka extratheca Ruiz, 2010
- Kupiuka heteropicta Ruiz, 2010
- Kupiuka murici Ruiz, 2010
- Kupiuka overalli Ruiz, 2010
- Kupiuka paulista Ruiz, 2010
- Kupiuka taruman Ruiz, 2010
- Kupiuka vochysiae Ruiz, 2010
