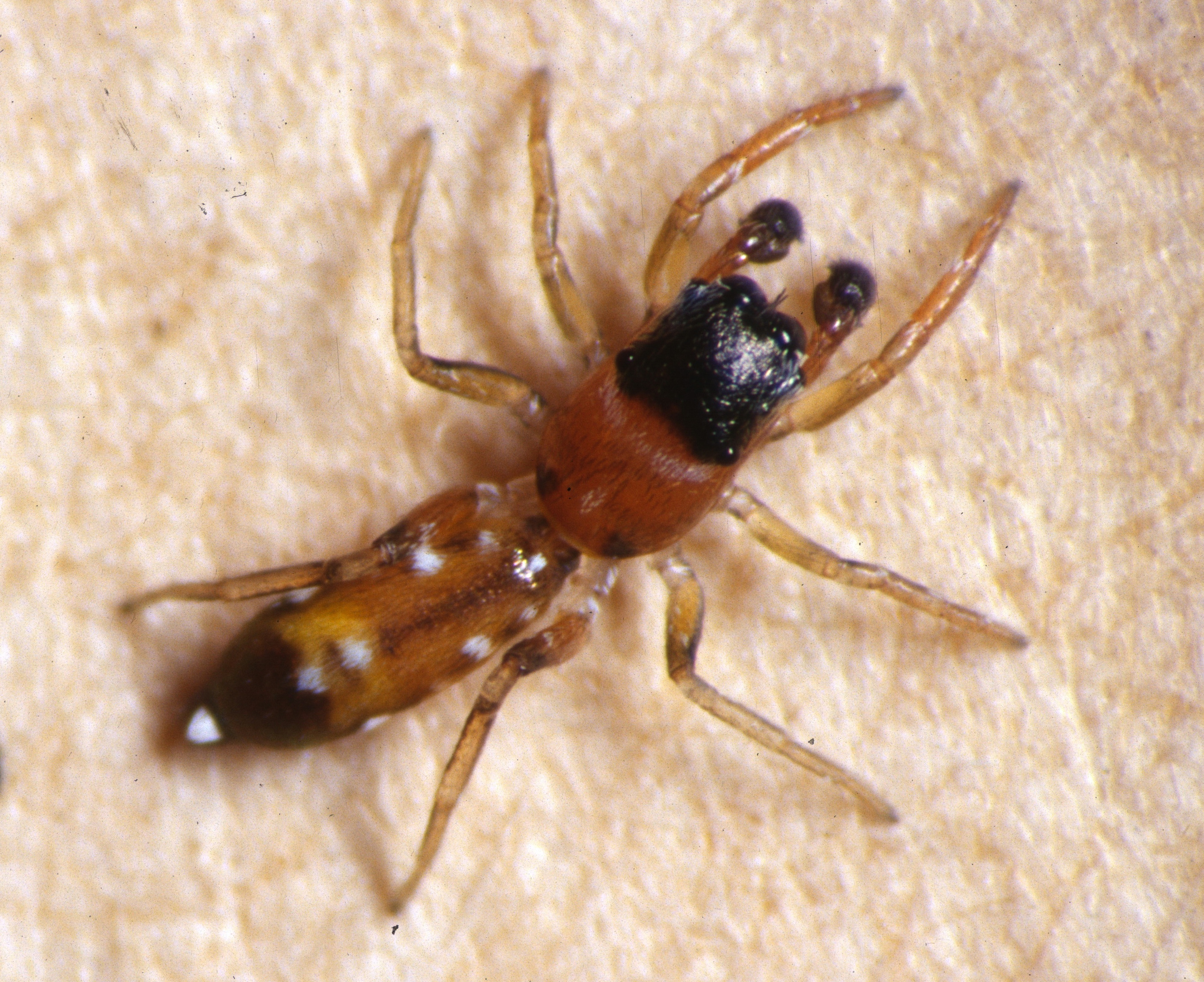
- Yepoella male from Ecuador

Scientific classification
- Kingdom: Animalia
- Phylum: Arthropoda
- Subphylum: Chelicerata
- Class: Arachnida
- Order: Araneae
- Infraorder: Araneomorphae
- Family: Salticidae
- Genus: Yepoella; Galiano, 1970
- Species: Y. crassistyli

Binomial name
- Yepoella crassistyli Galiano, 1970

= Yepoella =

Genus of spiders

Yepoella is a monotypic genus of Argentinian jumping spiders containing the single species, Yepoella crassistyli. It was first described by María Elena Galiano in 1970, and is found in Argentina. A second species, Y. tenuistyli Galiano, 1970, was moved to Theriella in 1996.
