= Ogdenia =

Scientific classification
- Kingdom: Animalia
- Phylum: Arthropoda
- Subphylum: Chelicerata
- Class: Arachnida
- Order: Araneae
- Infraorder: Araneomorphae
- Family: Salticidae
- Genus: Ogdenia; Peckham & Peckham, 1908
- Species: O. mutilla

Binomial name
- Ogdenia mutilla (Peckham & Peckham, 1907)

Genus of spiders

Ogdenia is a monotypic genus of jumping spiders containing the single species, Ogdenia mutilla. It was first described by George Peckham in 1907, and is only found on Borneo.

Originally given the name Rooseveltia, it was renamed Ogdenia (after Milwaukee's Dr. H. V. Ogden) when it was discovered that the original name was preoccupied by a genus of fish.

These spiders are thought to mimic mutillid wasps. The Peckhams believed this genus was related to those of Hasarius.

The female epigyne was drawn by Proszynsky in 1984.
