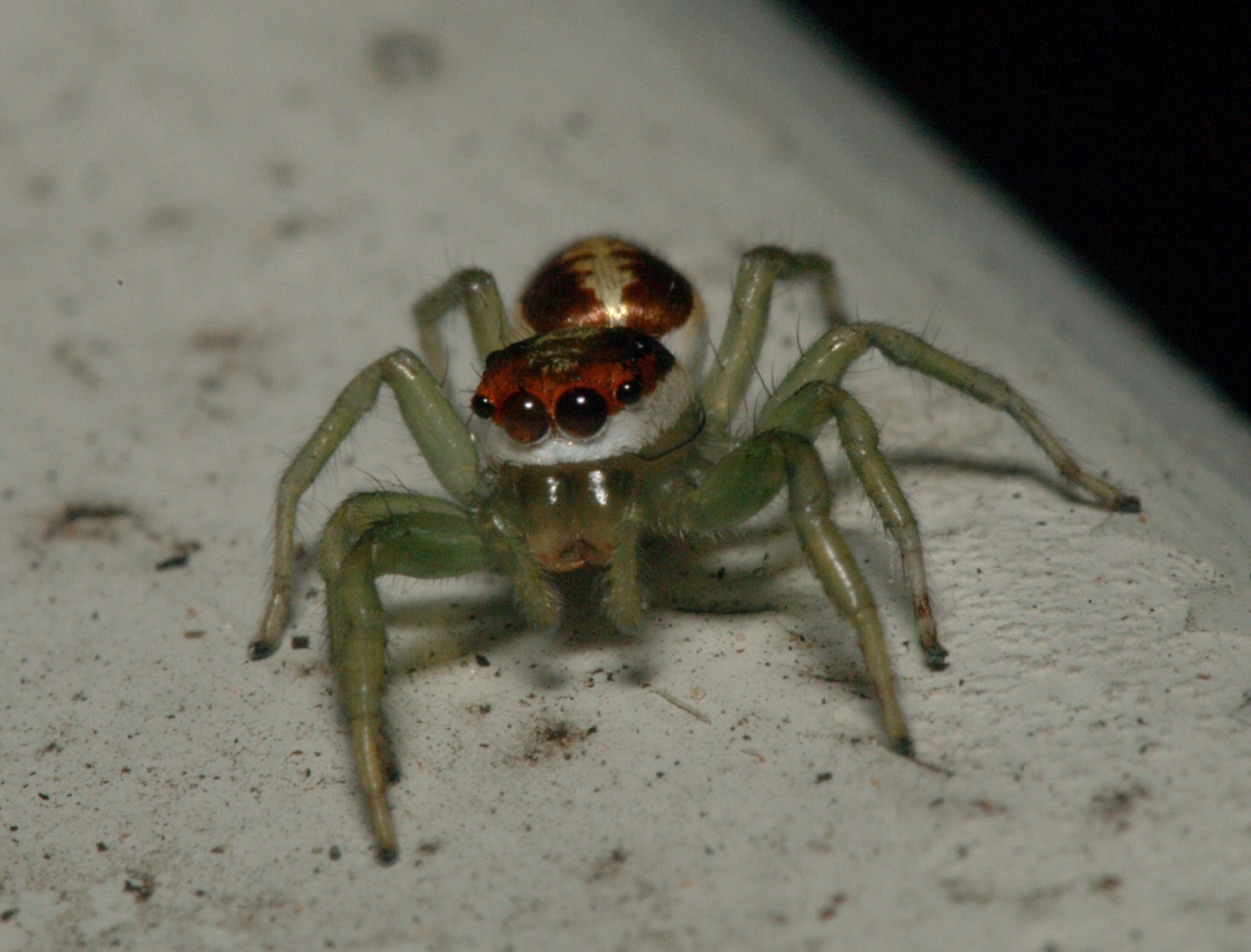
- female E. calcarata from Hong Kong

Scientific classification
- Kingdom: Animalia
- Phylum: Arthropoda
- Subphylum: Chelicerata
- Class: Arachnida
- Order: Araneae
- Infraorder: Araneomorphae
- Family: Salticidae
- Subfamily: Salticinae
- Genus: Epocilla; Thorell, 1887

Type species
- E. praetextata Thorell, 1887

Species
- 12, see text

Synonyms
- Goajara Peckham & Peckham, 1907

= Epocilla =

Genus of spiders

Epocilla is a genus of jumping spiders that was first described by Tamerlan Thorell in 1887. The name comes from Ἐπόκιλλος (Epocillus), a soldier of Alexander the Great.

== Species ==
As of July 2024 it contains twelve species, found in Asia, Mauritius, on the Seychelles, and Hawaii:

- Epocilla aura (Dyal, 1935) – Pakistan, India
- Epocilla aurantiaca (Simon, 1885) – India, Sri Lanka, Nepal, Myanmar, Malaysia, Vietnam
- Epocilla blairei Żabka, 1985 – China, Vietnam
- Epocilla calcarata (Karsch, 1880) – India, China to Indonesia (Sulawesi). Introduced to Seychelles, United States (Hawaii)
- Epocilla chimakothiensis Jastrzebski, 2007 – Bhutan
- Epocilla femoralis Simon, 1901 – Indonesia (Sumatra)
- Epocilla innotata Thorell, 1895 – Myanmar
- Epocilla mauriciana Simon, 1901 – Mauritius
- Epocilla picturata Simon, 1901 – China
- Epocilla praetextata Thorell, 1887 – India, Bhutan, China, Myanmar to Indonesia (Java)
- Epocilla sirohi Caleb, Chatterjee, Tyagi, Kundu & Kumar, 2017 – India
- Epocilla xylina Simon, 1906 – India
