= Theriella =

Scientific classification
- Kingdom: Animalia
- Phylum: Arthropoda
- Subphylum: Chelicerata
- Class: Arachnida
- Order: Araneae
- Infraorder: Araneomorphae
- Family: Salticidae
- Subfamily: Salticinae
- Genus: Theriella; Braul & Lise, 1996

Type species
- T. galianoae Braul & Lise, 1996

Species
- T. bertoncelloi Braul & Lise, 2003 – Brazil; T. galianoae Braul & Lise, 1996 – Brazil; T. tenuistyli (Galiano, 1970) – Argentina

Genus of spiders

Theriella is a genus of South American jumping spiders that was first described by A. Braul & A. A. Lise in 1996. As of August 2019 it contains only three species, found only in Argentina and Brazil: T. bertoncelloi, T. galianoae, and T. tenuistyli. T. tenuistyla was moved from Yepoella when this genus was erected.
