= Okinawicius =

Scientific classification
- Kingdom: Animalia
- Phylum: Arthropoda
- Subphylum: Chelicerata
- Class: Arachnida
- Order: Araneae
- Infraorder: Araneomorphae
- Family: Salticidae
- Subfamily: Salticinae
- Genus: Okinawicius; Prószyński, 2016

Type species
- Okinawicius okinawaensis

Species
- 9, see text

Genus of spiders

Okinawicius is a genus of spiders in the family Salticidae. It was first described in 2016 by Prószyński. As of 2024, it contains 9 species.

== Taxonomy ==
The genus Okinawicius was one of a number of new genera erected by Jerzy Prószyński in 2016, largely for species formerly placed in Pseudicius. Prószyński placed these genera in his informal group "pseudiciines", with Pseudicius as the representative genus. In Wayne Maddison's 2015 classification of the family Salticidae, Pseudicius, broadly circumscribed, is placed in the tribe Chrysillini, part of the Salticoida clade of the subfamily Salticinae.

=== Species ===
Okinawicius comprises the following species:

- Okinawicius daitaricus (Prószyński, 1992)
- Okinawicius delesserti (Caporiacco, 1941)
- Okinawicius modestus (Simon, 1885)
- Okinawicius okinawaensis (Prószyński, 1992)
- Okinawicius sheherezadae (Prószyński, 1989)
- Okinawicius shirinae (Prószyński, 1989)
- Okinawicius sindbadi (Prószyński, 1989)
- Okinawicius tekdi Tripathi & Kulkarni, 2024
- Okinawicius tokarensis (Bohdanowicz & Prószyński, 1987)
