= Paraheliophanus =

Scientific classification
- Kingdom: Animalia
- Phylum: Arthropoda
- Subphylum: Chelicerata
- Class: Arachnida
- Order: Araneae
- Infraorder: Araneomorphae
- Family: Salticidae
- Subfamily: Salticinae
- Genus: Paraheliophanus; Clark & Benoit, 1977

Type species
- P. subinstructus (O. Pickard-Cambridge, 1873)

Species
- 4, see text

Genus of spiders

Paraheliophanus is a genus of Atlantic jumping spiders that was first described by D. J. Clark & P. L. G. Benoit in 1977. The name is a combination of the Ancient Greek "para" (παρά), meaning "alongside", and the salticid genus Heliophanus.

== Species ==
As of August 2019 it contains four species, found only on Saint Helena:

- Paraheliophanus jeanae Clark & Benoit, 1977 – St. Helena
- Paraheliophanus napoleon Clark & Benoit, 1977 – St. Helena
- Paraheliophanus sanctaehelenae Clark & Benoit, 1977 – St. Helena
- Paraheliophanus subinstructus (O. Pickard-Cambridge, 1873) (type) – St. Helena
