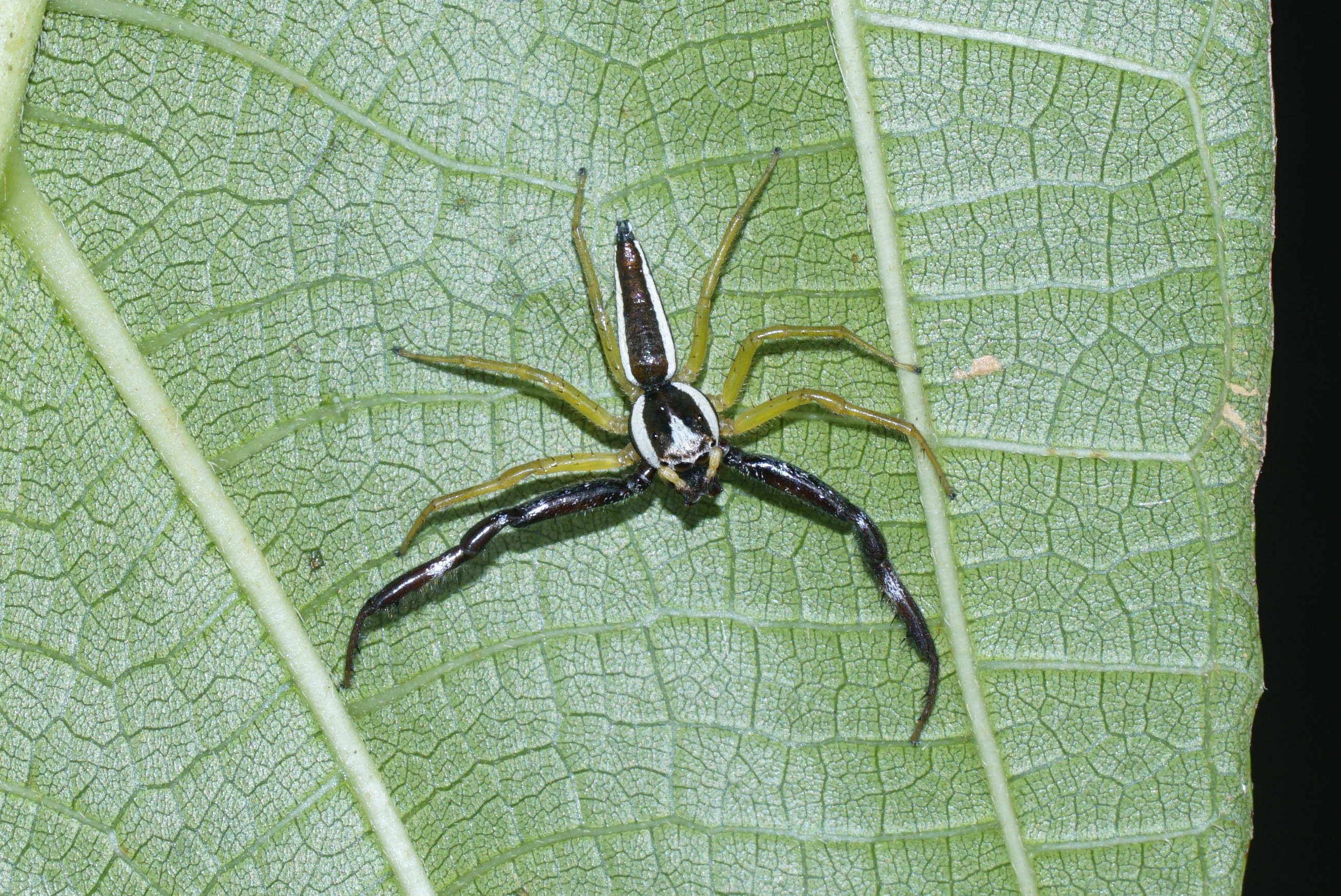

Scientific classification
- Kingdom: Animalia
- Phylum: Arthropoda
- Subphylum: Chelicerata
- Class: Arachnida
- Order: Araneae
- Infraorder: Araneomorphae
- Family: Salticidae
- Genus: Epocilla
- Species: E. aurantiaca

Binomial name
- Epocilla aurantiaca (Simon, 1885)

= Epocilla aurantiaca =

Species of spider

Epocilla aurantiaca is a species of jumping spider found from India to Malaysia.
