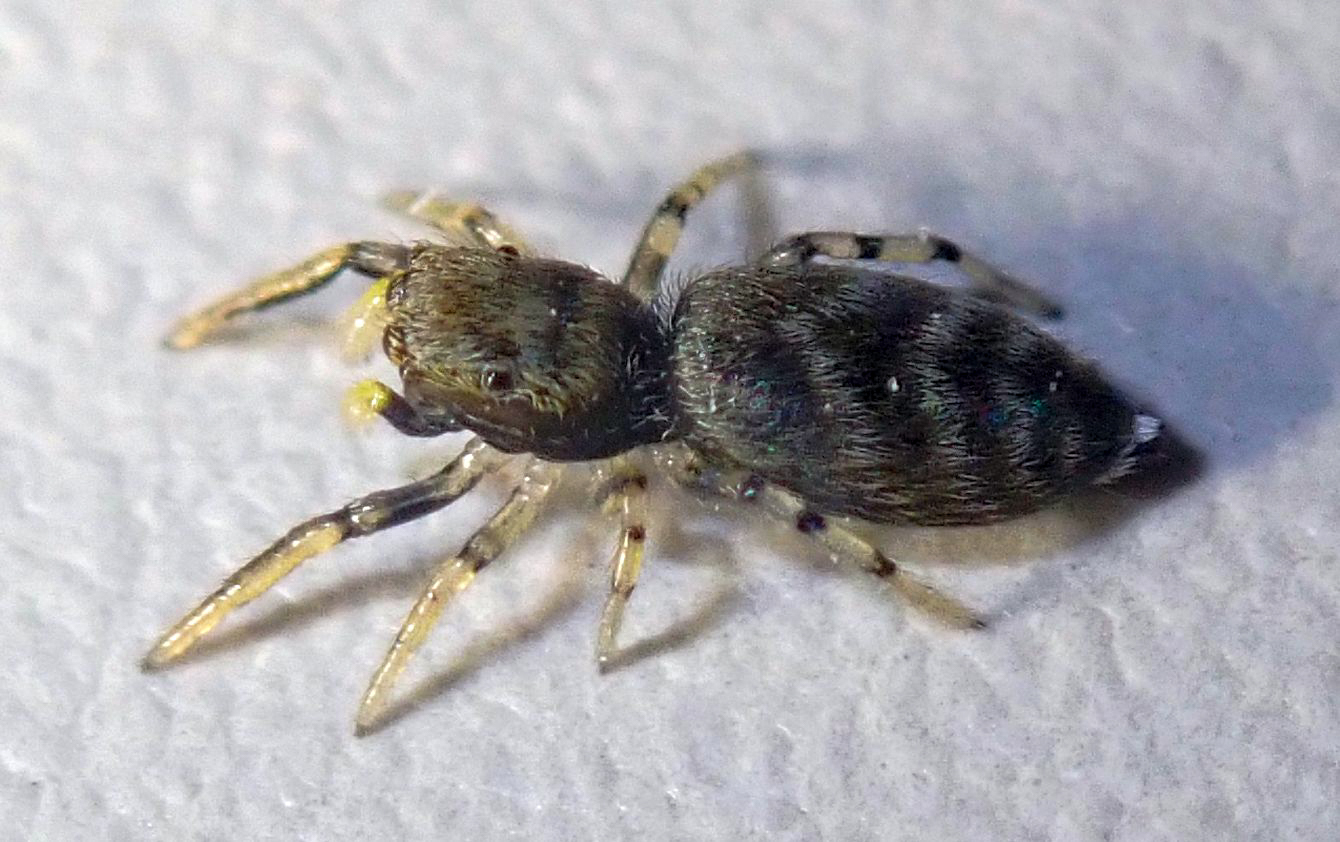
- specimen from Japan

Scientific classification
- Kingdom: Animalia
- Phylum: Arthropoda
- Subphylum: Chelicerata
- Class: Arachnida
- Order: Araneae
- Infraorder: Araneomorphae
- Family: Salticidae
- Subfamily: Salticinae
- Genus: Helicius; Żabka, 1981

Type species
- Maevia cylindrata Karsch, 1879

Species
- See text.

= Helicius =

Genus of spiders

Helicius is a genus of the spider family Salticidae (jumping spiders).

== Species ==
As of May 2017, the World Spider Catalog lists the following species in the genus:

- Helicius chikunii (Logunov & Marusik, 1999) – Russia
- Helicius cylindratus (Karsch, 1879) – Korea, Japan
- Helicius hillaryi Zabka, 1981 – Bhutan
- Helicius yaginumai Bohdanowicz & Prószyński, 1987 – Korea, Japan
