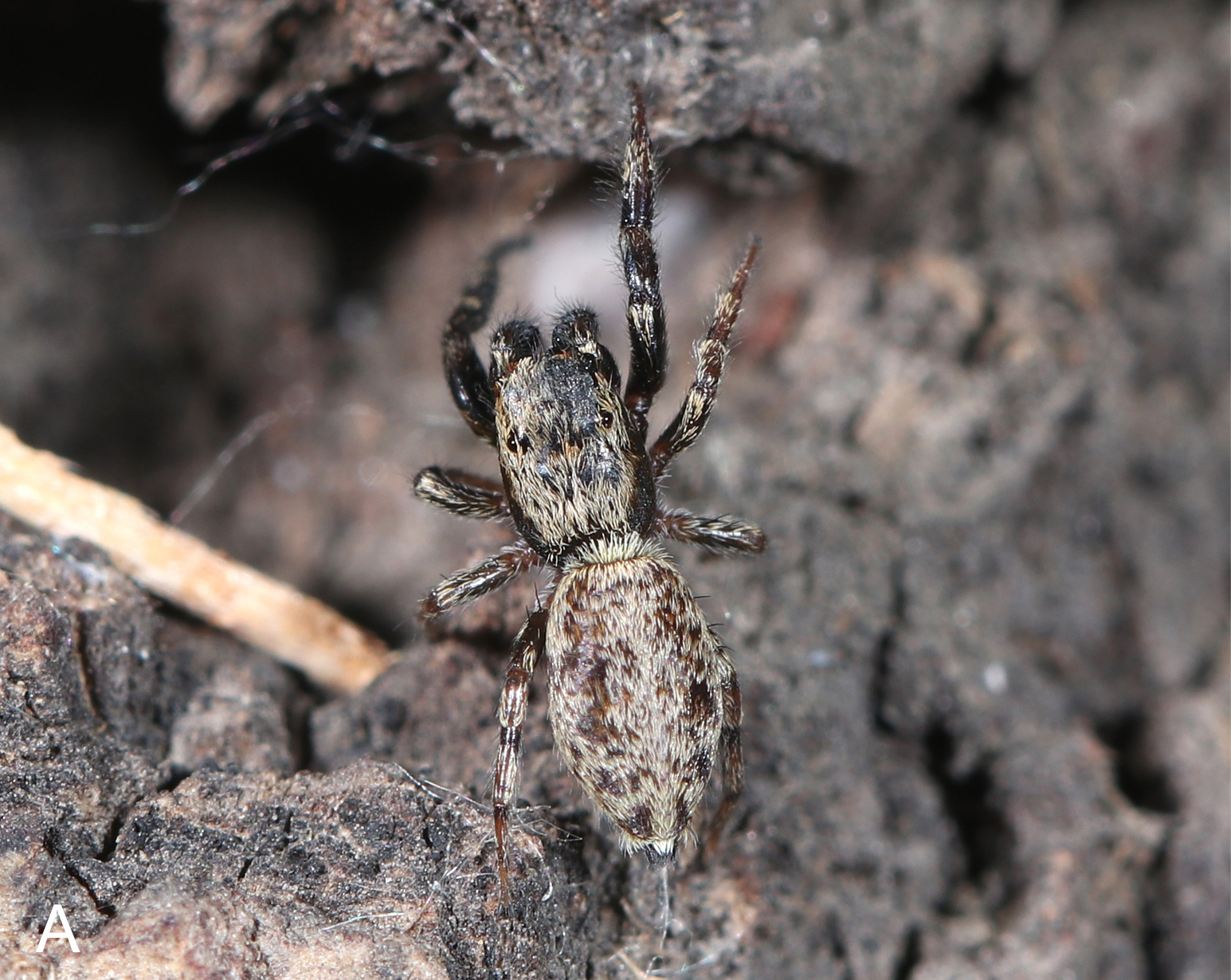
- male T. koreana

Scientific classification
- Kingdom: Animalia
- Phylum: Arthropoda
- Subphylum: Chelicerata
- Class: Arachnida
- Order: Araneae
- Infraorder: Araneomorphae
- Family: Salticidae
- Subfamily: Salticinae
- Genus: Tasa; Wesolowska, 1981

Type species
- T. davidi (Schenkel, 1963)

Species
- T. davidi (Schenkel, 1963) – China; T. koreana (Wesołowska, 1981) – China, Korea, Japan

= Tasa =

Genus of spiders

Tasa is a genus of East Asian jumping spiders that was first described by Wanda Wesołowska in 1981. As of September 2025 it contains only two species, found only in Japan, Korea, and China: T. davidi and T. koreana.
