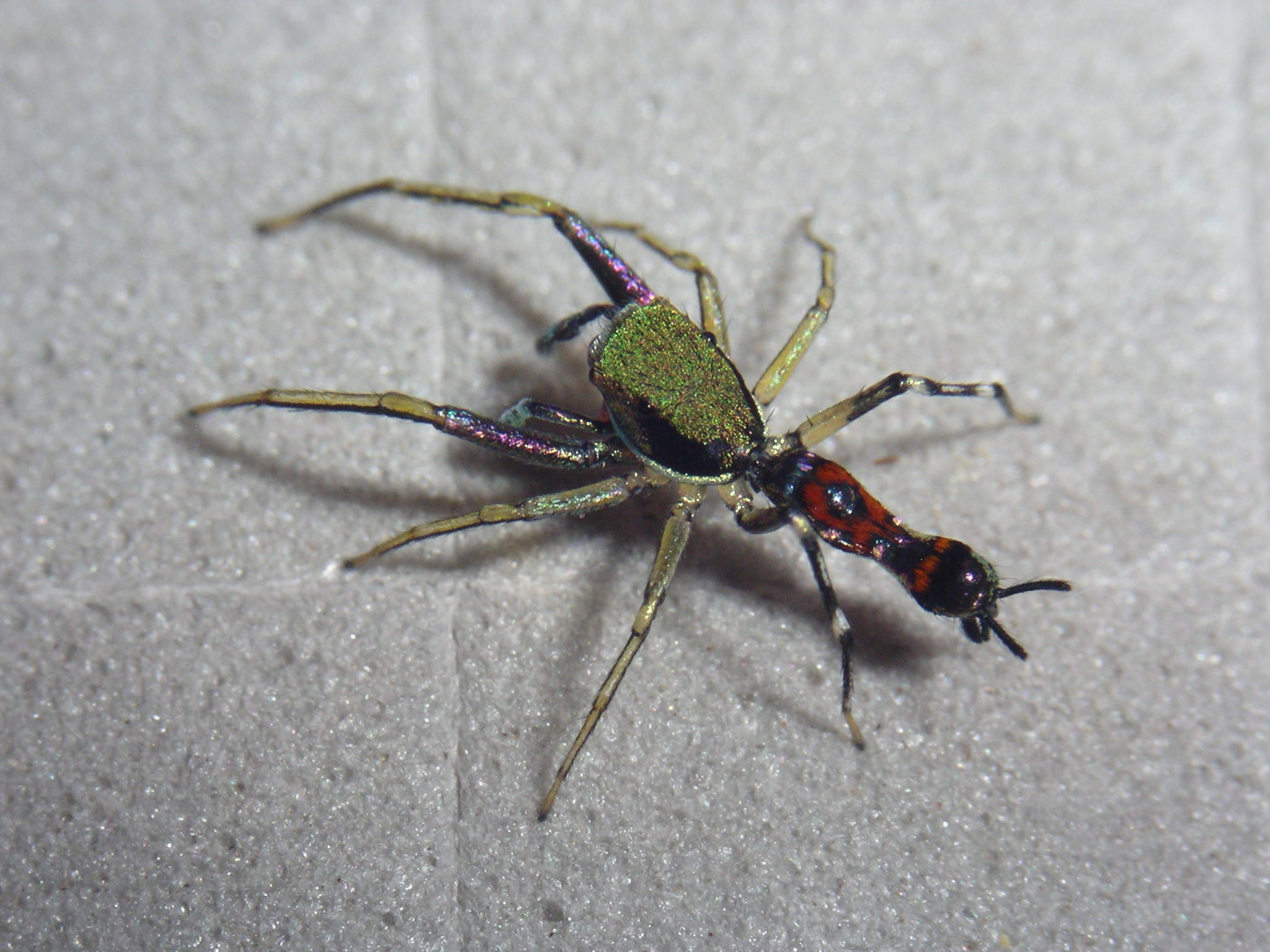
- Male Orsima ichneumon in Malaysia

Scientific classification
- Kingdom: Animalia
- Phylum: Arthropoda
- Subphylum: Chelicerata
- Class: Arachnida
- Order: Araneae
- Infraorder: Araneomorphae
- Family: Salticidae
- Subfamily: Salticinae
- Genus: Orsima; Simon, 1901

Type species
- O. constricta Simon, 1901

Species
- O. constricta Simon, 1901 – West, Central Africa; O. ichneumon (Simon, 1901) – Malaysia, Indonesia (Sumatra, Borneo); O. thaleri Prószyński & Deeleman-Reinhold, 2012 – Indonesia (Sumatra)

= Orsima =

Genus of spiders

Orsima is a genus of jumping spiders that was first described by Eugène Louis Simon in 1901. As of August 2019 it contains only three species, found only in Africa, Indonesia, and Malaysia: O. constricta, O. ichneumon, and O. thaleri. O. ichneumon was considered a Polyrhachis ant mimic in reverse, but this theory was later dismissed.
