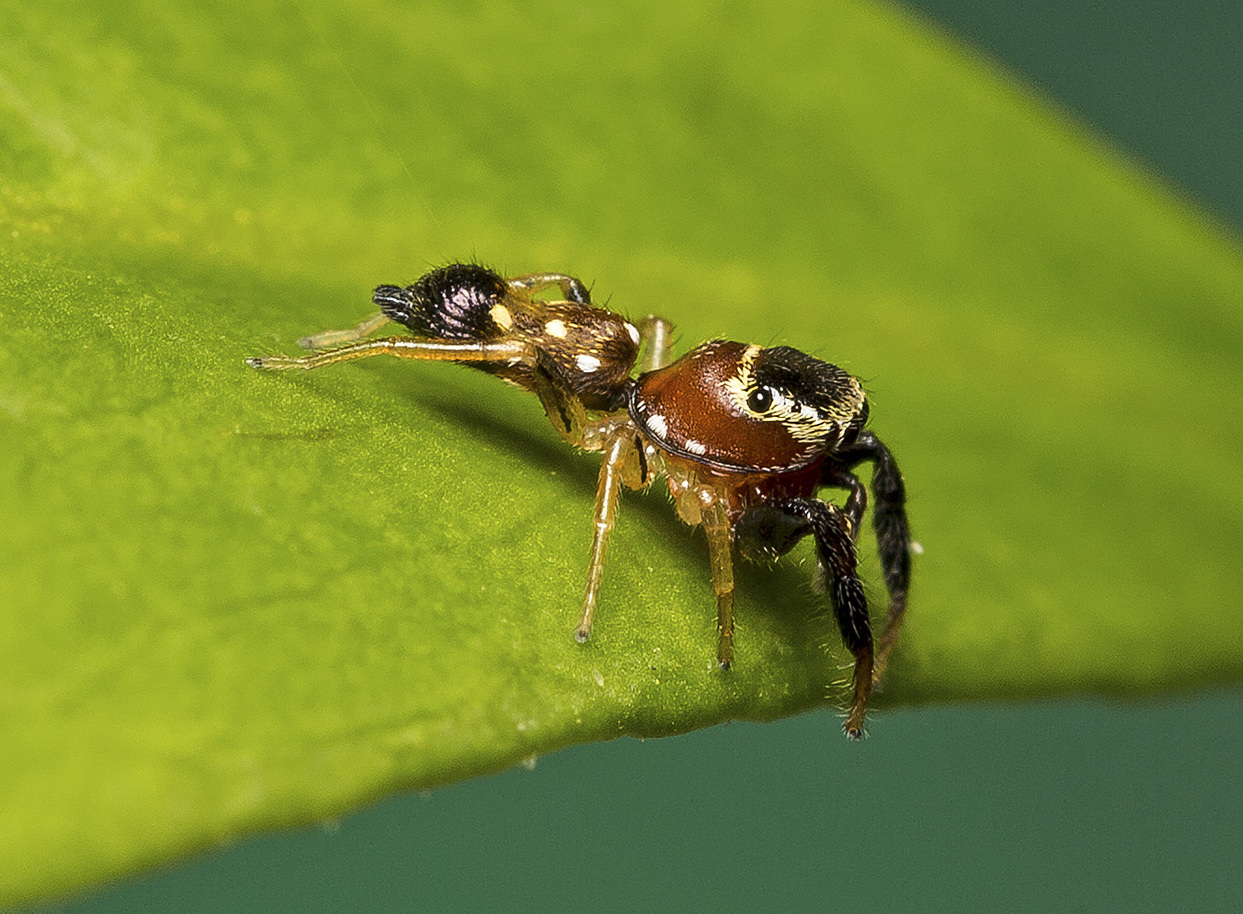

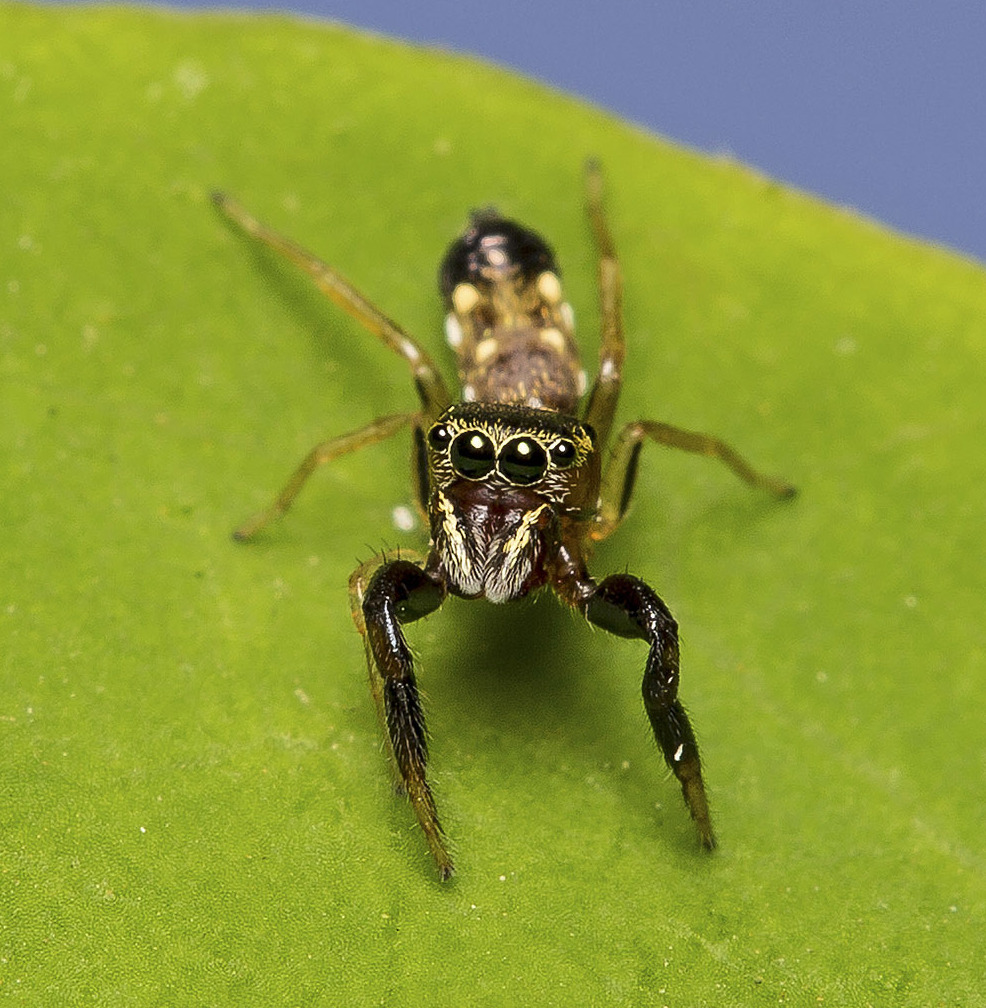

Conservation status
- Endangered (IUCN 3.1)

Scientific classification
- Kingdom: Animalia
- Phylum: Arthropoda
- Subphylum: Chelicerata
- Class: Arachnida
- Order: Araneae
- Infraorder: Araneomorphae
- Family: Salticidae
- Genus: Icius
- Species: I. nigricaudus

Binomial name
- Icius nigricaudus Wesołowska & Haddad, 2009

= Icius nigricaudus =

Species of spider

Icius nigricaudus, the Blacktailed Icius Jumping Spider, is a species of jumping spider in the genus Icius that lives in South Africa. It was first described in 2009 by Wanda Wesołowska and Charles Haddad. The spider is small, with a carapace measuring between 1.3 and 1.4 mm (0.05 and 0.06 in) long and an abdomen that is between 1.2 and 1.6 mm (0.05 and 0.06 in) in length. The female has a larger abdomen than the male, but otherwise they are similarly sized. The carapace is brown with a white stripe down the middle, the male also having white spots. The female abdomen is black with a white stripe. The male black and olive-yellow with white patches. The spider has distinctive copulatory organs. The male has a distinctive pedipalp with a tegulum with a low posterior node, a straight embolus, and hooked tibial apophysis, or appendage. The female has a simple epigyne with long and narrow seminal ducts.

== Taxonomy ==
Icius nigricaudus is a jumping spider that was first described by Wanda Wesołowska and Charles Haddad in 2009. It was one of over 500 species identified by Wesołowska during her career, making her the most prolific of her time. It is also known as the Blacktailed Icius Jumping Spider. They allocated to the genus Icius, raised by Eugène Simon in 1876. The genus name is based on two Greek words that can be translated distinct, or special, face. The species name derives from two Latin words means black tail. The genus is a member of the tribe Chrysillini, within the subclade Saltafresia in the clade Salticoida. Chrysillines, which had previously been termed heliophanines, are monophyletic. In 2016, Jerzy Prószyński split the genus from the Chrysillines into a group called Iciines, named after the genus. He stated the split was for practical reasons as Chrysillines had become unwieldy.

== Description ==
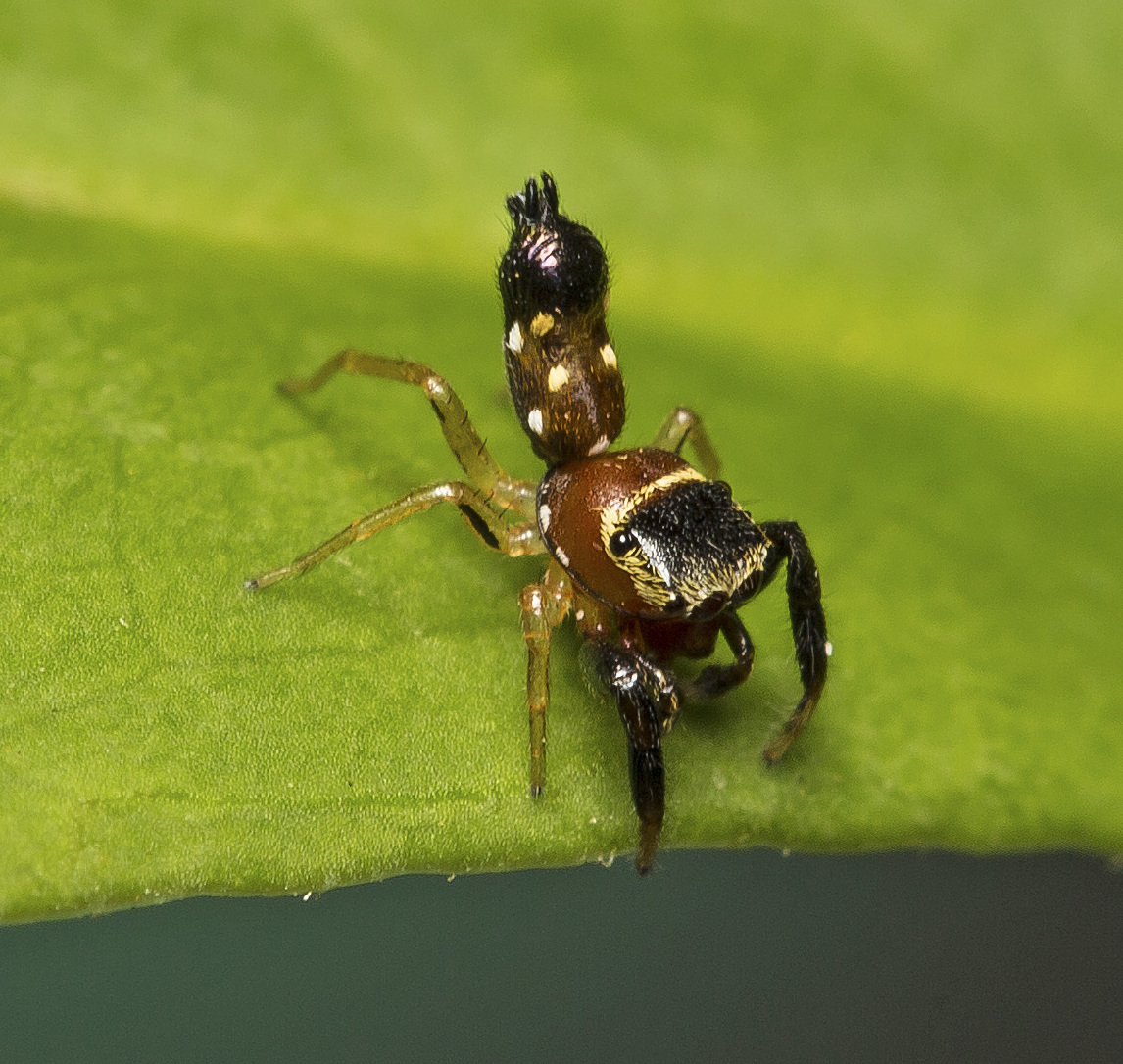

Icius nigricaudus is a small slender spider. The male has a carapace that is between 1.3 and 1.4 mm (0.05 and 0.06 in) long and 0.9 and 1.0 mm (0.04 and 0.04 in) wide. It is oval, low with a back that is particularly sloped. It is generally brown with a black line running along its edges and a pattern of four small patches of white hairs on the sides, the whole covered in delicate translucent hairs. The eye field is black with small scales near the eyes themselves. The underside of the spider opposite the carapace, the sternum, is light brown. The spider's face, or clypeus, is very low. The chelicerae are brown and unidentate. The other mouthparts include the labium, which is fawn-brown. The abdomen is between 1.2 and 1.3 mm (0.05 and 0.05 in) long and between 0.6 and 0.8 mm (0.02 and 0.03 in) wide. It is an elongated oval, the frontal two-thirds olive-yellow and the rearmost third black, marked with five patches formed of white scales. The underside is similar in colour to the topside. The spinnerets are black. The front legs are larger than the others, and black rather than brown. All the legs have fine brown hairs. The pedipalps are dark with a scattering of white hairs. The tegulum has a low posterior node, the embolus is straight and the tibial apophysis, or appendage, is hooked.

The female is similar in size and shape to the male. The carapace is the same size and colour but lacks the spots of the male. The sternum is yellow. The chelicerae are similar, but the labium is brown. The abdomen is larger, measuring typically 1.6 mm (0.06 in) in length and 1 mm (0.04 in) in width, and has a black top with a white stripe down the middle and a narrow streak on the sides to the front. The underside is black with a yellow area visible and three small patches near the spinnerets. The legs and pedipalps are yellow. The epigyne has a slight indentation towards the front but is otherwise very simple. The copulatory openings lead to simple seminal ducts, which lead directly to the receptors,

The species can be differentiated from others in the genus by its copulatory organs. The male has a distinctive pedipalp and the female long and narrow seminal ducts. The female most closely resembles Icius dendryphantoides but can be identified by the elongated, rather than spherical, receptacles. The spider somewhat resembles ants of the Crematogaster genus in colour and size.

== Distribution and habitat ==
Icius nigricaudus is endemic to South Africa. The holotype was discovered in 2005 in the Ndumo Game Reserve. The species is rare and lives on grasses found near to rivers and other wetlands and in the bark of Vachellia xanthophloea. It has been declared to be an Endangered species in 2019.
