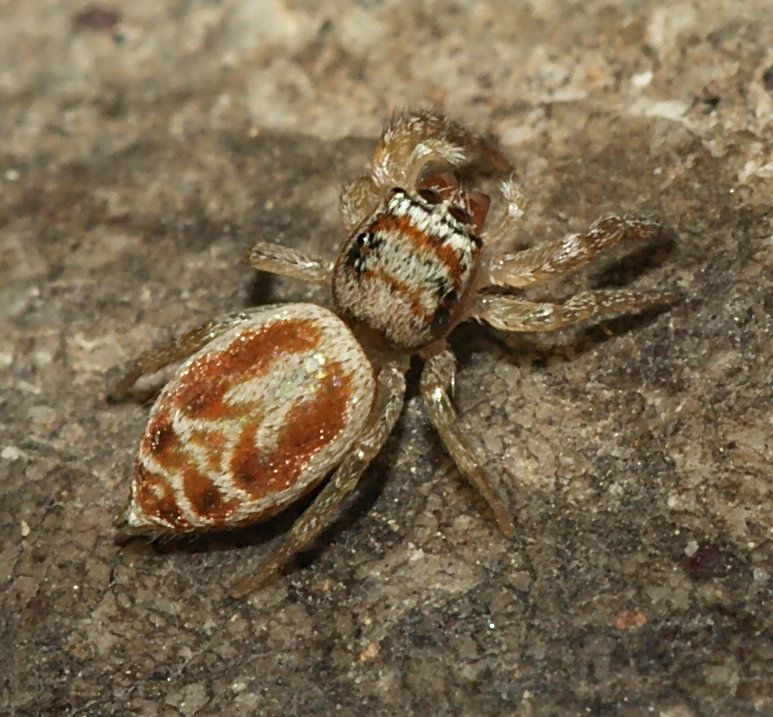
- female from Spain

Scientific classification
- Kingdom: Animalia
- Phylum: Arthropoda
- Subphylum: Chelicerata
- Class: Arachnida
- Order: Araneae
- Infraorder: Araneomorphae
- Family: Salticidae
- Genus: Icius
- Species: I. congener

Binomial name
- Icius congener (Simon, 1871)

Synonyms
- Attus nebulosus Simon, 1868 nec Koch, 1846; Attus congener Simon, 1871; Icius nebulosus Roewer, 1955

= Icius congener =

Species of jumping spider

Icius congener is a species of jumping spider of the genus Icius. It is found around the western Mediterranean Basin.

== Taxonomy ==
The species has a complex taxonomic history involving misidentifications. Icius congener was first described by Eugène Simon in 1868 as Attus nebulosus, but this name was already occupied by a different species described by Carl Ludwig Koch in 1846 (now known as Dendryphantes nidicolens). In 1871, Simon recognized this error and renamed the species Attus congener. However, the first description that allows reliable identification of the male was provided by Simon in 1876.

In 1955, Carl Friedrich Roewer listed this species as Icius nebulosus in his catalogue, treating congener as a synonym, but this choice was considered arbitrary by later researchers since Simon had already corrected the misidentification in 1871.

== Distribution ==
I. congener is distributed around the western Mediterranean region. It has been recorded from Portugal, Spain, Andorra, France (Corsica), Italy, Malta, Algeria, and Libya. Simon (1937) also reported its presence in Sicily and Sardinia. The species gravitates around the western Mediterranean Basin.

== Description ==
Male I. congener can be distinguished by the shape of the bulb's apex and the distinctive tibial apophysis. The tibial apophysis is elongate and triangular, directed outward with a short tip that turns inward, and has a thickening at its base without a process. The embolus is moderately curved and very small, with the distal portion of the bulb much longer than wide.

Females have straight, parallel copulatory canals that widen at the opening, where the diameter is greater than that of the canal itself. This distinguishes them from closely related species like Icius hamatus, where the canals have a narrow apical portion that curves outwardly.

Both sexes show a dark dorsal pattern on the opisthosoma (abdomen) with a central lighter pattern, which is more pronounced in females. Males typically measure 3.5 mm in length, while females are larger at 5.2–5.3 mm.
