= Dendroicius =

Scientific classification
- Kingdom: Animalia
- Phylum: Arthropoda
- Subphylum: Chelicerata
- Class: Arachnida
- Order: Araneae
- Infraorder: Araneomorphae
- Family: Salticidae
- Genus: Dendroicius; Lin & Li, 2020
- Species: D. hotaruae

Binomial name
- Dendroicius hotaruae Lin & Li, 2020

Genus of jumping spiders

Dendroicius is a monotypic genus of east Asian jumping spiders containing the single species, Dendroicius hotaruae. It was first described by Y. J. Lin and S. Q. Li in 2020, who distinguished it from Icius, but did not place it into a subfamily.

== See also ==
- List of Salticidae genera
