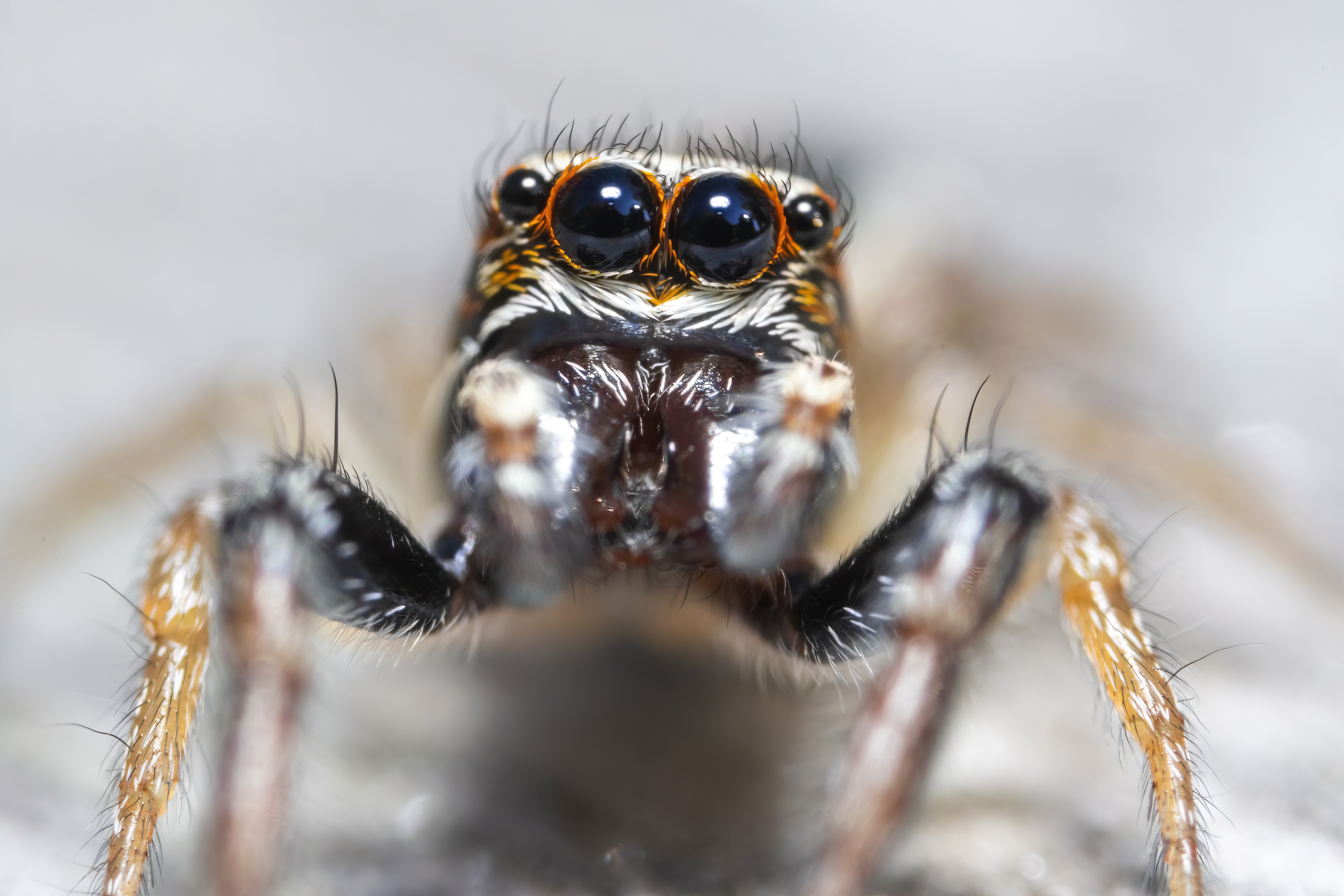
- A spider of the Icius genus

Scientific classification
- Kingdom: Animalia
- Phylum: Arthropoda
- Subphylum: Chelicerata
- Class: Arachnida
- Order: Araneae
- Infraorder: Araneomorphae
- Family: Salticidae
- Genus: Icius
- Species: I. minimus

Binomial name
- Icius minimus Wesołowska & Tomasiewicz, 2008

= Icius minimus =

Species of spider

Icius minimus is a species of jumping spider in the genus Icius that lives in Ethiopia near hot springs and lakes. It is a small spider, with a cephalothorax between 1.5 and 2.3 mm (0.059 and 0.091 in) long and an abdomen between 1.8 and 3.3 mm (0.071 and 0.130 in) long. The male is smaller than the female, as is recalled in the species name. The spider is similar to the related Icius pulchellus but has a distinctive pattern on the abdomen. The male abdomen is brown with two white stripes fringed with black lines. The female has a large white patch and a pattern of wide stripes, mostly interrupted. The male tibial apophysis is also unusual, being short and shaped like a spatula. The female has longer receptacles than other spiders in the genus. The spider was first described in 2008 by Wanda Wesołowska and Beata Tomasiewicz.

== Taxonomy and etymology ==
Icius minimus is a jumping spider, a member of the family Salticidae., that was first described by Wanda Wesołowska and Beata Tomasiewicz in 2008. It was one of over 500 species identified by Wesołowska during her career. It was allocated to the genus Iciuswhich had been first circumscribed by Eugène Simon in 1876. The genus name is based on two Greek words that can be translated distinct, or special, face. The species name is a Latin word and recalls the relatively small size of the male.

Icius was placed in the tribe Heliophaninae, which was renamed Chrysillini by Wayne Maddison in 2015. The tribe is ubiquitous across most of the continents of the world. It is allocated to the subclade Saltafresia in the clade Salticoida. Chrysillines, which had previously been termed heliophanines, are a monophyletic group. The genus was provisionally placed alongside Pseudicius. In 2016, Jerzy Prószyński split the genus from the Chrysillines into a group called Iciines, named after the genus. He stated the split was for practical reasons as Chrysillines had become unwieldy.

== Description ==
Icius minimus is a small spider. It has a body is divided into two main parts, a rounded cephalothorax and a narrower abdomen. The male has a cephalothorax that ranges between 1.5 and 1.8 mm (0.059 and 0.071 in) in length and between 1.3 and 1.4 mm (0.051 and 0.055 in) in width. The oval carapace, the hard upper part of the cephalothorax, is a brown and of low height. It is covered in black hairs apart from a few spots made of white hairs. The spider's eye field is darker, particularly around the eyes, which is black. The underside of the cephalothorax, or sternum is a yellowish-brown. The clypeus is low, with short white hairs. The chelicerae are dark brown and unidentate. There are protruding light hairs on the outside of the chelicerae. The remainder of the mouthparts, including the labium and maxillae, are brown with light tips.

The male has an oval abdomen that is larger than the carapace, between 1.8 and 2.0 mm (0.071 and 0.079 in) long and between 1.1 and 1.2 mm (0.043 and 0.047 in) wide. It is generally brown, lighter to the back end, with a distinctive pattern made up of two narrow white stripes fringed by black lines. The underside of the abdomen is yellow and marked with two darker lines. The spinnerets are brown. The front legs are long and dark brown, while the remainder are yellow. All the legs have brown hairs. The pedipalps are yellow. The spider's copulatory organs are distinctive. The cymbium is hairy, partially encasing a similarly hairy palpal bulb. The palpal bulb is bulbous, with bulges to the bottom and top, and a short spiky embolus curving from one of the bulges near the top. The palpal tibia has a short tibial apophysis, or spike, that is shaped like a spatula and has an additional short spike that sticks out from near its base.

The female is larger than the male, with a cephalothorax that is between 2.2 and 2.3 mm (0.087 and 0.091 in) in length and between 1.6 and 1.7 mm (0.063 and 0.067 in) in width. The carapace is similar in colour, with white hairs on the edge. Compared to the male, the spots are less clear. Its sternum is yellow. Some of the spiders found have a large brown patch in the middle of the sternum. There is a white cross on the eye field. The mouthparts are similar to the male.

The female's abdomen is also larger, measuring between 2.9 and 3.3 mm (0.11 and 0.13 in) long and between 1.8 and 2.4 mm (0.071 and 0.094 in) wide It is generally brown with a pattern consisting of a thick white stripe across the front and two interrupted wide white stripes behind, and a big white patch across the middle. The underside is light apart from three thin brown lines. The spinnerets have more grey in their colouring and the legs are all brown, although the front legs are darker like the male. The epigyne has two round depressions that hide the copulatory openings. The seminal ducts are short and the spermathecae, or receptacles, are elongated. There are accessory glands that also lead to the receptacles.

The species is similar to others in the genus, particularly Icius pulchellus. It can be best distinguished by its colours and the pattern on the abdomen. The male has a distinctive tibial apophysis and the female has longer receptacles than other Icius spiders.

== Distribution and habitat ==
Icius minimus is endemic to Ethiopia. The holotype was discovered in 1982 in the Awash National Park near hot springs. Other examples have been found in clumps of Cyperus papyrus and other vegetation close to lakes.
