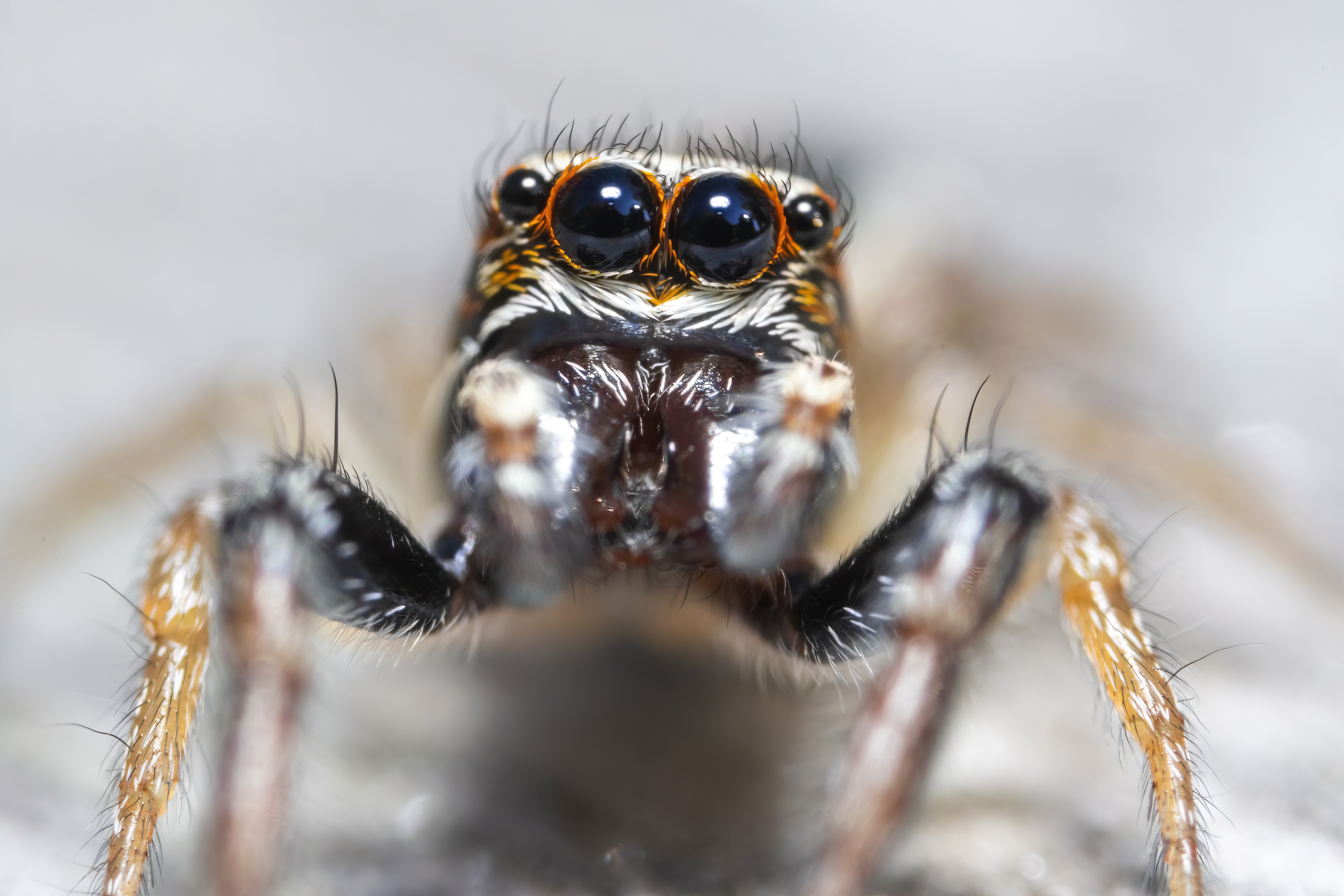
- A spider of the Icius genus

Scientific classification
- Kingdom: Animalia
- Phylum: Arthropoda
- Subphylum: Chelicerata
- Class: Arachnida
- Order: Araneae
- Infraorder: Araneomorphae
- Family: Salticidae
- Genus: Icius
- Species: I. olokomei

Binomial name
- Icius olokomei Wesołowska & Russell-Smith, 2011

= Icius olokomei =

Species of spider

Icius olokomei is a species of jumping spider in the genus Icius that lives in Nigeria. It was first described in 2011 by Wanda Wesołowska and Anthony Russell-Smith. Only the female has been described. The spider is small, with a cephalothorax typically 1.8 mm (0.071 in) long and an abdomen 2.6 mm (0.10 in) long. The abdomen has a pattern made up of light patches that are identical to the right and left. The spider has an unusually large epigyne that helps to differentiate it from other species in the genus. The epigyne is marked by two large depressions and has gonopores that are hidden in deep epigynal pockets.

== Taxonomy ==
Icius olokomei is a jumping spider that was first described by Wanda Wesołowska and Anthony Russell-Smith in 2011. It was one of over 500 species identified by Wesołowska during her career. They allocated it to the genus Icius, which had been raised by Eugène Simon in 1876. The genus name is based on two Greek words that can be translated distinct, or special, face. The species name recalls the area where it was first discovered. The genus is a member of the tribe Chrysillini, within the subclade Saltafresia in the clade Salticoida. Chrysillines, which had previously been termed heliophanines, are monophyletic. In 2016, Jerzy Prószyński split the genus from the Chrysillines into a group called Iciines, named after the genus. He stated the split was for practical reasons as Chrysillines had become unwieldy.

== Description ==
Icius olokomei is a small spider. The male has a cephalothorax that is typically 1.8 mm (0.071 in) long and 1.5 mm (0.059 in) wide. The carapace is a brown oval of medium height with lines formed of white hairs along the sides. The eye field is darker, black towards the eyes. The chelicerae are unidentate. The abdomen is larger than the carapace, with a typical length of 2.6 mm (0.10 in) and width of 1.9 mm (0.075 in). It is a grey-brown oval with a pattern made of six small light patches near the middle and eight along the edges. The pattern has a line of symmetry running down the middle of the back so that the right side is a mirror of the left. The underside is yellow. The spinnerets are yellow as are the majority of the legs. The epigyne is rounded with two large oval depressions and small areas of sclerotin. The other genital parts are relatively small and centrally located. The epigyne has deep pockets which hide the gonopores. The short seminal ducts lead to bean-shaped receptacles. The species is similar to others in the genus but can be distinguished by the large size of the epigyne, along with the size of the depressions and smaller receptacles placed in the middle of it. The male has not been described.

== Distribution ==
Icius olokomei is endemic to Nigeria. The holotype was discovered in 1973 in the Olokomei Forest Reserve near Ibadan.
