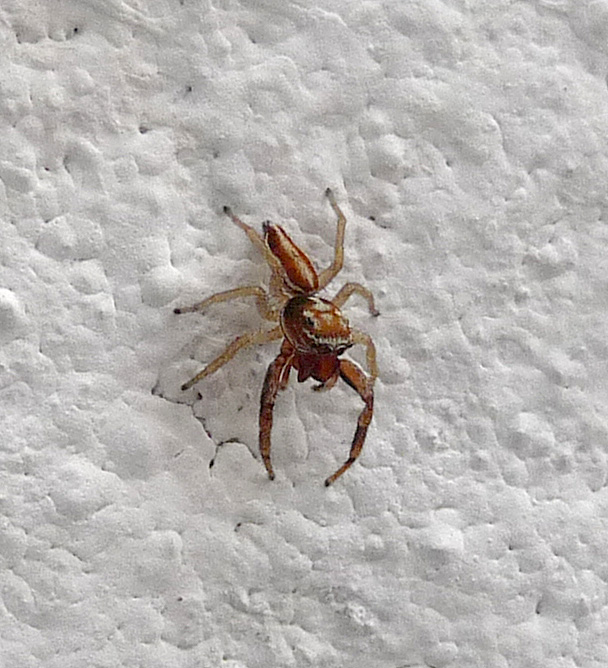
- A spider of the Icius genus

Scientific classification
- Kingdom: Animalia
- Phylum: Arthropoda
- Subphylum: Chelicerata
- Class: Arachnida
- Order: Araneae
- Infraorder: Araneomorphae
- Family: Salticidae
- Genus: Icius
- Species: I. bandama

Binomial name
- Icius bandama Wesołowska, 2022

= Icius bandama =

Species of spider

Icius bandama is a species of jumping spider in the genus Icius that lives in Ivory Coast. It was first described in 2022 by Wanda Wesołowska and Anthony Russell-Smith.. The spider lives communally amongst other spiders and preys on insects. It is small, with a cephalothorax between 2.0 and 2.1 mm (0.079 and 0.083 in) long and an abdomen 2.0 and 3.0 mm (0.079 and 0.118 in) long. The female and male carapace are similar in size and colouration. The male abdomen is greyish-beige and marked with a light streak and two stripes. The female has a yellowish-olive abdomen broken by a white band on the forward edge. The species is similar to other Icius spiders but differs in the shape of the tibial apophysis, or spike, on the male and the lack of a pocket on the epigynal and internal structure of the copulatory organs of the female.

== Taxonomy ==
Icius bandama was first described by Wanda Wesołowska and Anthony Russell-Smith in 2022. It was one of over 500 species identified by the Polish arachnologist Wesołowska during her career. They allocated it to the genus Icius, which had been raised by Eugène Simon in 1876. The genus name is based on two Greek words that can be translated distinct, or special, face. The species is named after the place where it was found. The genus is a member of the tribe Chrysillini, within the subclade Saltafresia in the clade Salticoida. Chrysillines, which had previously been termed heliophanines, are monophyletic. In 2016, Jerzy Prószyński split the genus from the Chrysillines into a group called Iciines, named after the genus. He stated the split was for practical reasons as Chrysillines had become unwieldy.

== Description ==
Icius bandama is a small spider. The male has a cephalothorax that is typically 2.1 mm (0.083 in) long and 1.7 mm (0.067 in) wide. The oval carapace is very flat, reddish-brown and covered in colourless hairs. The eye field is black. The chelicerae are brown with two teeth at the front and one to the bacK. The labium and other mouthparts are light brown. The ovoid abdomen is similar in size to the carapace, typically 2.0 mm (0.079 in) long and 1.4 mm (0.055 in) wide. It is generally greyish-beige, with a light streak down the middle crossed by two stripes towards the back. The underside is more yellow. The spinnerets are light. The front legs are light brown, while the remainder are yellow and thinner. All the legs have brown hairs and spines. The pedipalps are yellow with small copulatory organs. The palpal bulb. Is ovoid, the embolus short and the tibial apophysis, or appendage, is short and wide.

The female has a larger abdomen to the male, for while the cephalothorax is typically 2.0 mm (0.079 in) long and 1.5 mm (0.059 in) wide, the abdomen is 3.0 mm (0.12 in) long and between 1.7 mm (0.067 in) wide. The carapace is similar in shape and also reddish-brown. There is a white streak along the edges and the hairs are light grey. The clypeus is low with white hairs. The abdomen is yellowish-olive with a band of white on the forward edge. The spinnerets are more yellow. The mouthparts and legs are similar to the male The epigyne is oval with a central atrium and the copulatory openings in small pockets. The internal structure is simple. The seminal ducts are curved, forming a loop.

The species is closely related to Icius grassei and is similar in size and colour, but the male has a wider tibial apophysis. The female can be distinguished by the lack of a pocket on the epigyne and the different internal structure of the copulatory organs.

== Distribution ==
Icius bandama is endemic to Ivory Coast. The male holotype was found in Lamto in Bandama Forest in 1975.
