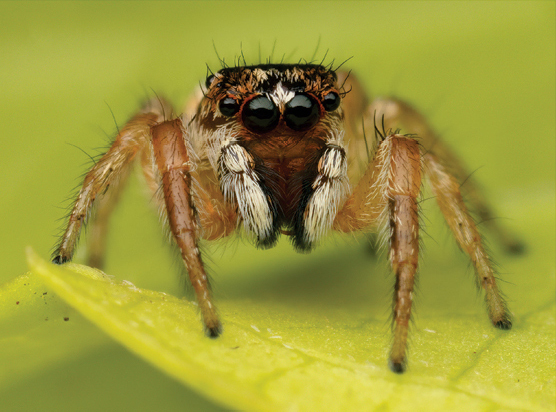
- A female from South Africa

Scientific classification
- Kingdom: Animalia
- Phylum: Arthropoda
- Subphylum: Chelicerata
- Class: Arachnida
- Order: Araneae
- Infraorder: Araneomorphae
- Family: Salticidae
- Genus: Icius
- Species: I. pulchellus

Binomial name
- Icius pulchellus Haddad & Wesołowska, 2011

= Icius pulchellus =

Species of jumping spider

Icius pulchellus is a species of jumping spider that lives in South Africa. A member of the genus Icius, the spider lives in grasslands and coastal environments. It was first described in 2011 by Charles Haddad and Wanda Wesołowska. The spider is small, with a forward section, or carapace, measuring between 2.0 and 2.5 mm (0.079 and 0.098 in) long and, behind this, an abdomen that is between 2.0 and 2.7 mm (0.079 and 0.106 in) in length. Its carapace is hairy and has a stripe running down the middle. The underside of the female's abdomen is covered in silver spots that are made of translucent guanine. The spider is similar to the related Icius minimus, but the male can be distinguished by the pattern on the top of its abdomen, which includes a brown stripe down the middle, and the female by the lack of a cross-hair pattern on its eye field. It copulatory organ are also distinctive, particularly the layout of the female's internal copulatory organs and the male's sickle-shaped embolus and short fat spike on its pedipalp, or tibial apophysis.

== Taxonomy and etymology ==
Icius pulchellus is a jumping spider, a member of the family Salticidae, that was first described by the arachnologists Charles Haddad and Wanda Wesołowska in 2011. It was one of over 500 species identified by Wesołowska during her career. It was allocated to the genus Icius, raised by Eugène Simon in 1876. The genus name is based on two Greek words that can be translated distinct, or special, face. The specific name derives from the Latin for fair, neat or pretty.

The genus is a member of the tribe Chrysillini, within the subclade Saltafresia in the clade Salticoida. Chrysillines, which had previously been termed heliophanines, are monophyletic. In 2016, Jerzy Prószyński split the genus from the Chrysillines into a group called Iciines, named after the genus. He stated the split was for practical reasons as Chrysillines had become unwieldy. The holotype is deposited in the National Collection of Arachnida at the ARC Plant Protection Research Institute in Pretoria.

== Description ==
Icius pulchellus is a small spider with body that is divided into two main parts: an ovoid forward section or cephalothorax and, to the rear of that, an oval abdomen. The female's cephalothorax is between 2.0 and 2.4 mm (0.079 and 0.094 in) long and 1.4 and 1.7 mm (0.055 and 0.067 in) wide. Its carapace, the hard upper part of its cephalothorax, is brown with a lighter streak running down the middle and a covering of light grey hairs interspersed with long brown bristles. Its eye field is black and has a denser covering of light grey hairs. Its sides are dark yellow and the part of its underside known as its sternum is yellow. It has light brown chelicerae, or jaws, that are unidentate. Its remaining mouthparts, including its labium and maxillae, are yellow.

The female's abdomen is similar in size to its carapace, measuring between 2.3 and 2.7 mm (0.091 and 0.106 in) in length and between 1.6 and 1.9 mm (0.063 and 0.075 in) in width. It is generally yellow or creamy-yellow and has a marking of a brownish leaf-shaped pattern on the top. In some specimens, the pattern is distinct and darker than in others. The underside of the abdomen is covered in silver spots made of translucent guanine. The spider's spinnerets, used for making silk, are light. Its legs are yellow with faint leg hairs and long brown spines. The female's epigyne, its external visible copulatory organ, is short and wide with large, separated copulatory openings. The openings lead via relatively short insemination ducts to elongated spermathecae, or receptacles. There are also clear accessory glands.

The male has a carapace that is similar in size to the female, between 2.0 and 2.5 mm (0.079 and 0.098 in) long and 1.5 and 2 mm (0.059 and 0.079 in) wide. It is oval, medium height and dark brown with a streak formed of white hairs down the middle and two more along the sides. Its eye field is black with reddish-fawn hairs. Its sternum is yellow and has a dark ring around it. Its chelicerae are large, dark brown and also unidentate. Its labium is orange and its maxillae have a brown streak.

The male's abdomen is similar in size to its carapace, between 2.0 and 2.4 mm (0.079 and 0.094 in) long and between 1.4 and 1.8 mm (0.055 and 0.071 in) wide. It is a dark brown oval with a brown stripe down the middle of the top, sides clothed in dense covering of light hairs, white, yellow and fawn, and a yellow underside. Its spinnerets are dark and its legs are yellow to light brown with brown and whitish hairs. Its front legs are longer than the others and have short spines. Its pedipalps are dark brown with white hairs on the top. At the tip of one of the pedipalp is its copulatory organs. There is a short fat tibial apophysis, or appendage attached to the palpal tibia. Attached to the tibia is an palpal bulb that is an irregular shape that has a sickle-shaped embolus protecting from it.

The species is similar to others in the genus, particularly Icius minimus. The male can be distinguished by the shape of the tibial apophysis and the pattern on the abdomen. The female's spermathecae are parallel to the rear edge of its epigyne and its eye field lacks the cross hair pattern that can be seen on the other species.

== Distribution and habitat ==
Icius pulchellus is endemic to South Africa. The male holotype was discovered in 2009 in the Sandveld Nature Reserve. Examples have been found in Free State and Northern Cape. The species lives in grasslands and coastal environments.
