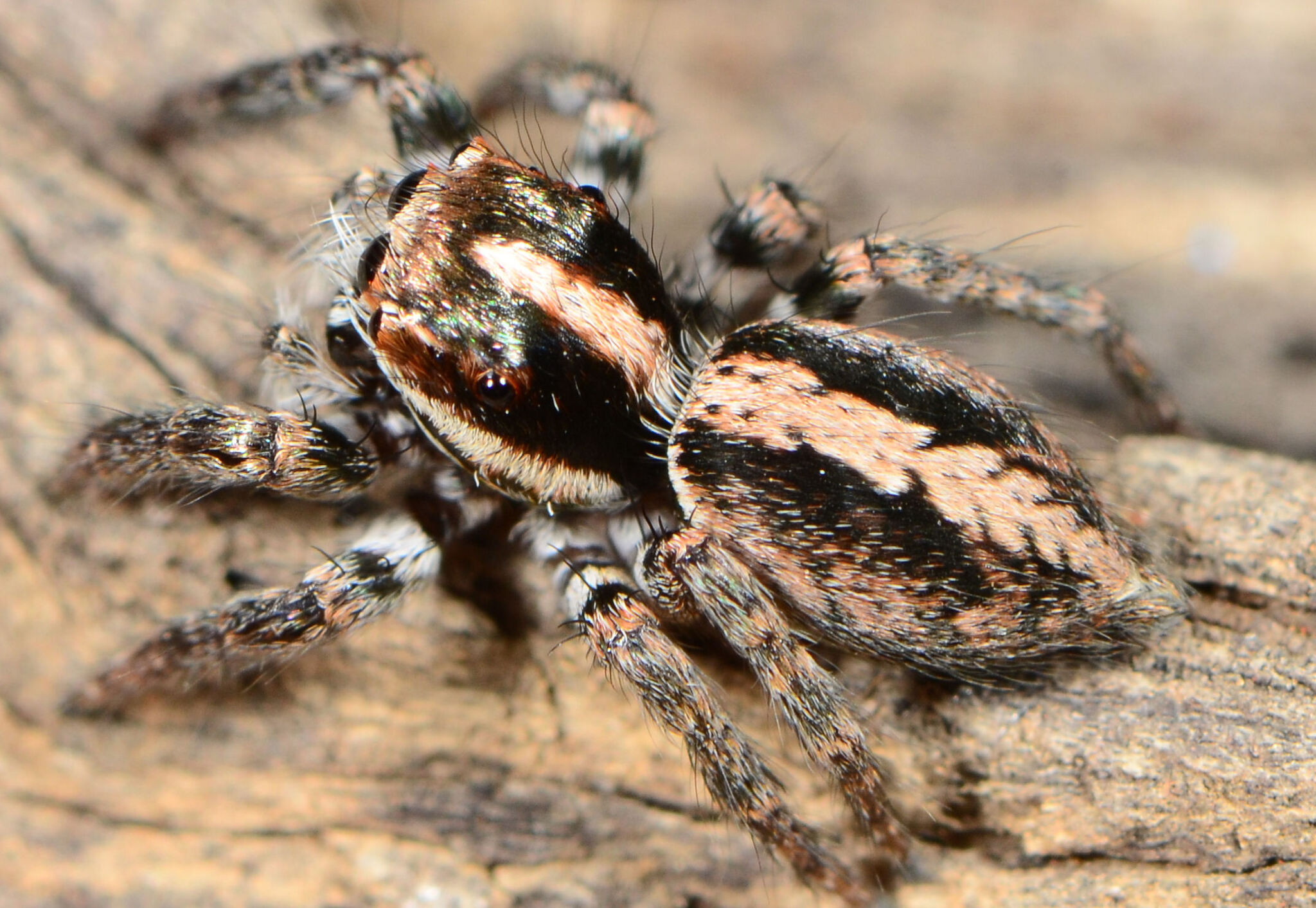
- female
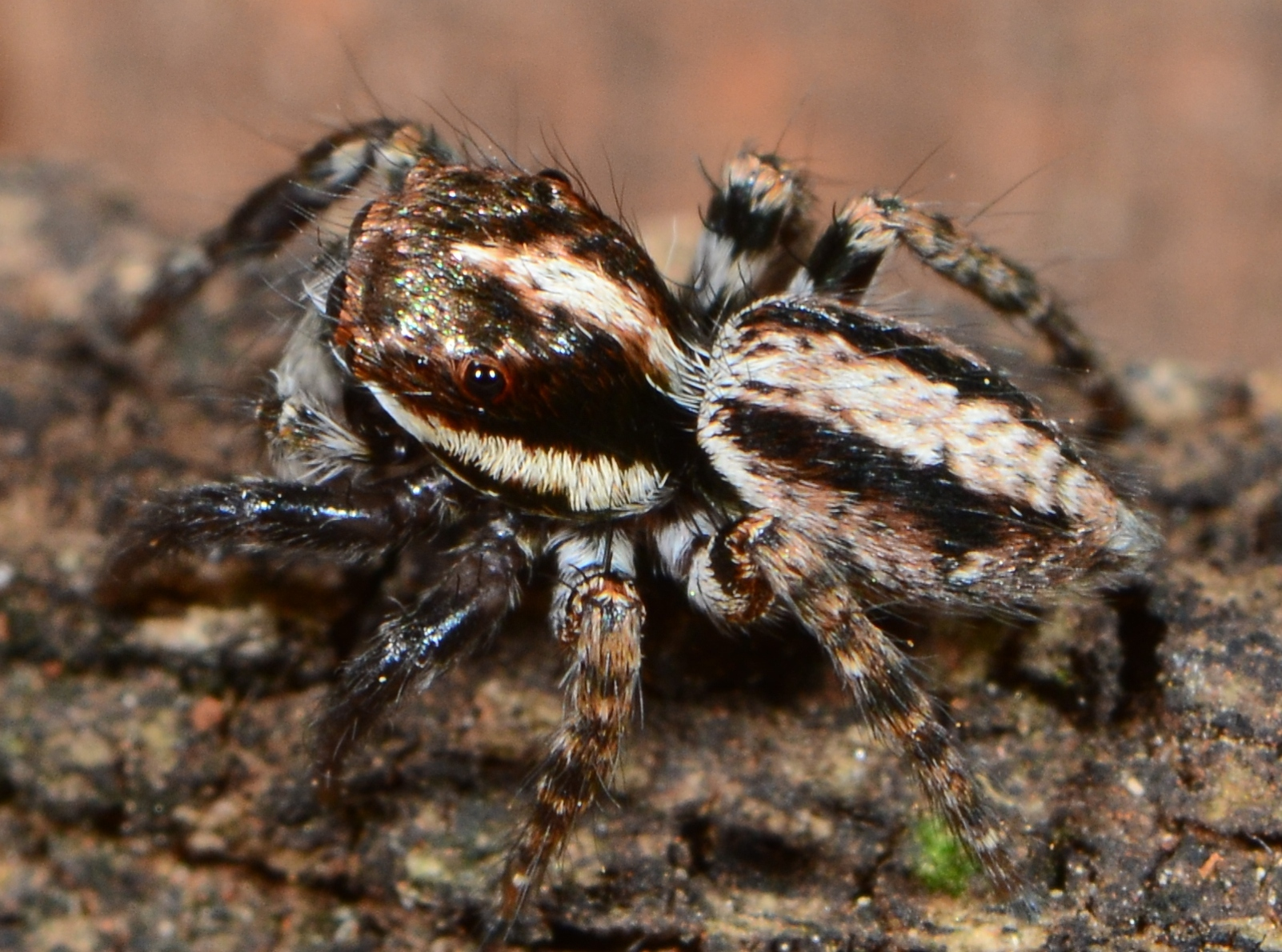
- male

Scientific classification
- Kingdom: Animalia
- Phylum: Arthropoda
- Subphylum: Chelicerata
- Class: Arachnida
- Order: Araneae
- Infraorder: Araneomorphae
- Family: Salticidae
- Genus: Icius
- Species: I. insolidus

Binomial name
- Icius insolidus (Wesołowska, 1999)

Synonyms
- Menemerus insolidus Wesołowska, 1999

= Icius insolidus =

Species of spider

Icius insolidus is a species of jumping spider in the genus Icius that lives in Namibia and South Africa. First described in 1999 by Wanda Wesołowska and allocated to the genus Menemerus, the species was transferred to its current genus in 2006.

It lives in rocky environments, primarily granite rocks and boulders, but also the walls of gardens. It is a small spider, with a carapace between 1.8 and 2.4 mm (0.071 and 0.094 in) and an abdomen between 1.7 and 2.4 mm (0.067 and 0.094 in) in length. It is very dark brown or black. The male carapace and abdomen have a white stripe down the middle. The female abdomen has a vague white leaf-like pattern on the top. The male has a prominent tooth (projection) on the base of the chelicerae. It is this tooth that helps distinguish the species from others in the genus. The female epigyne has two widely separated rounded depressions. The species lives in nests, and the male and female will often share a nest after mating.

== Taxonomy and etymology ==
Icius insolidus is a species of jumping spider, a member of the family Salticidae, that was first described by Wanda Wesołowska in 1999. It was one of over 500 species identified by the Polish arachnologist Wesołowska during her career, making her one of the most prolific in the field. She originally allocated the spider to the genus Menemerus, first circumscribed in 1868 by Eugène Simon. Originally, only the female had been identified. In 2006, when she first described the male, Wesołowska moved the species to the genus Icius on the basis of its chelicerae and the structure of its palpal bulb. The genus was circumscribed by Eugène Simon in 1876. The genus was provisionally placed alongside Pseudicius.

Icius was placed in the tribe Heliophaninae, which was renamed Chrysillini by Wayne Maddison in 2015. The tribe is ubiquitous across most of the continents of the world. It is allocated to the subclade Saltafresia in the clade Salticoida. Chrysillines, which had previously been termed heliophanines, are a monophyletic group. In 2016, Jerzy Prószyński split the genus from the Chrysillines into a group called Iciines, named after the genus. He stated the split was for practical reasons as Chrysillines had become unwieldy. The genus name is based on two Greek words, ίδιος and όψη, that can be translated distinct, or special, face. The second part of the species name derives from the Latin word insolidus meaning 'undurable'.

== Description ==
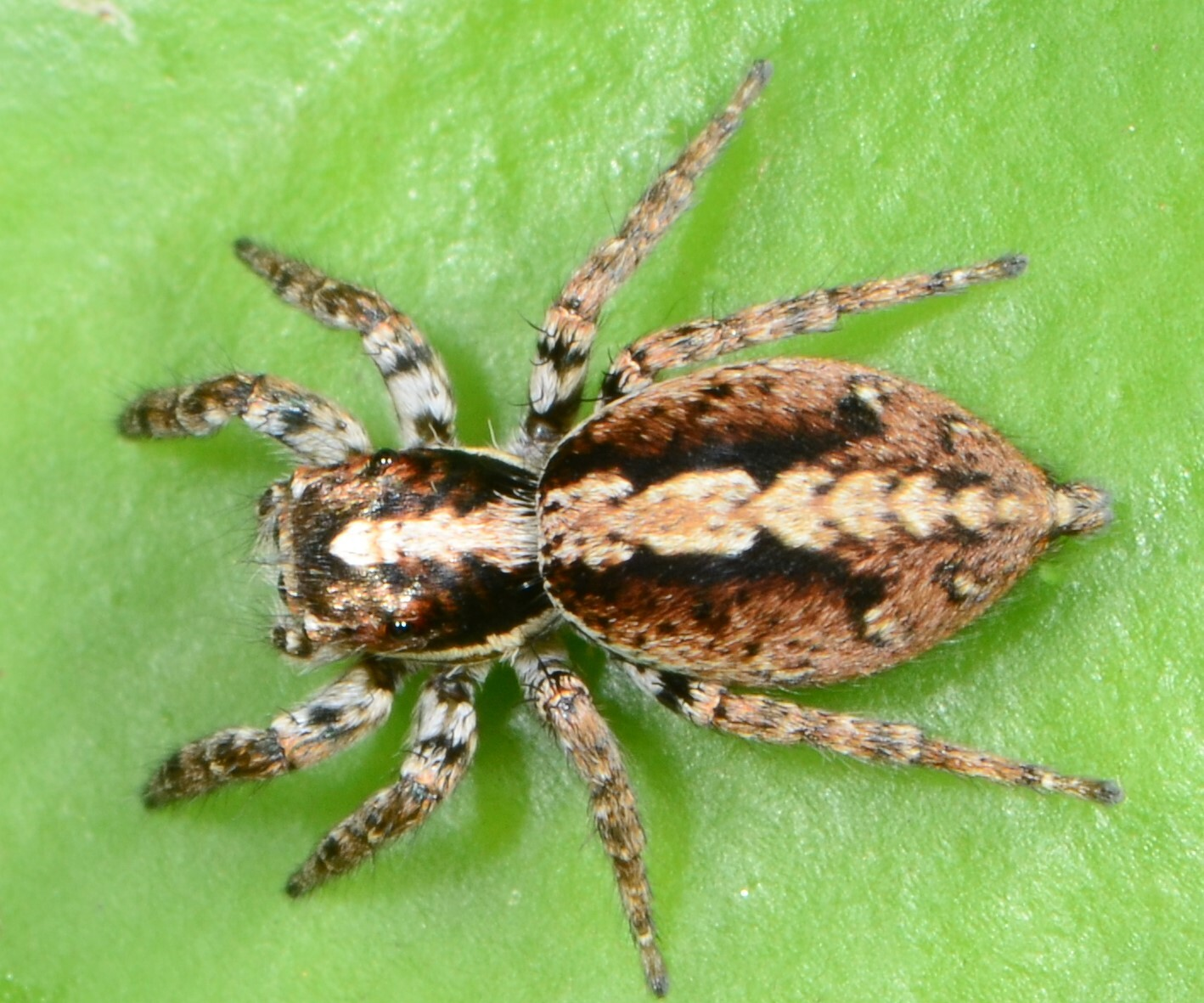
female

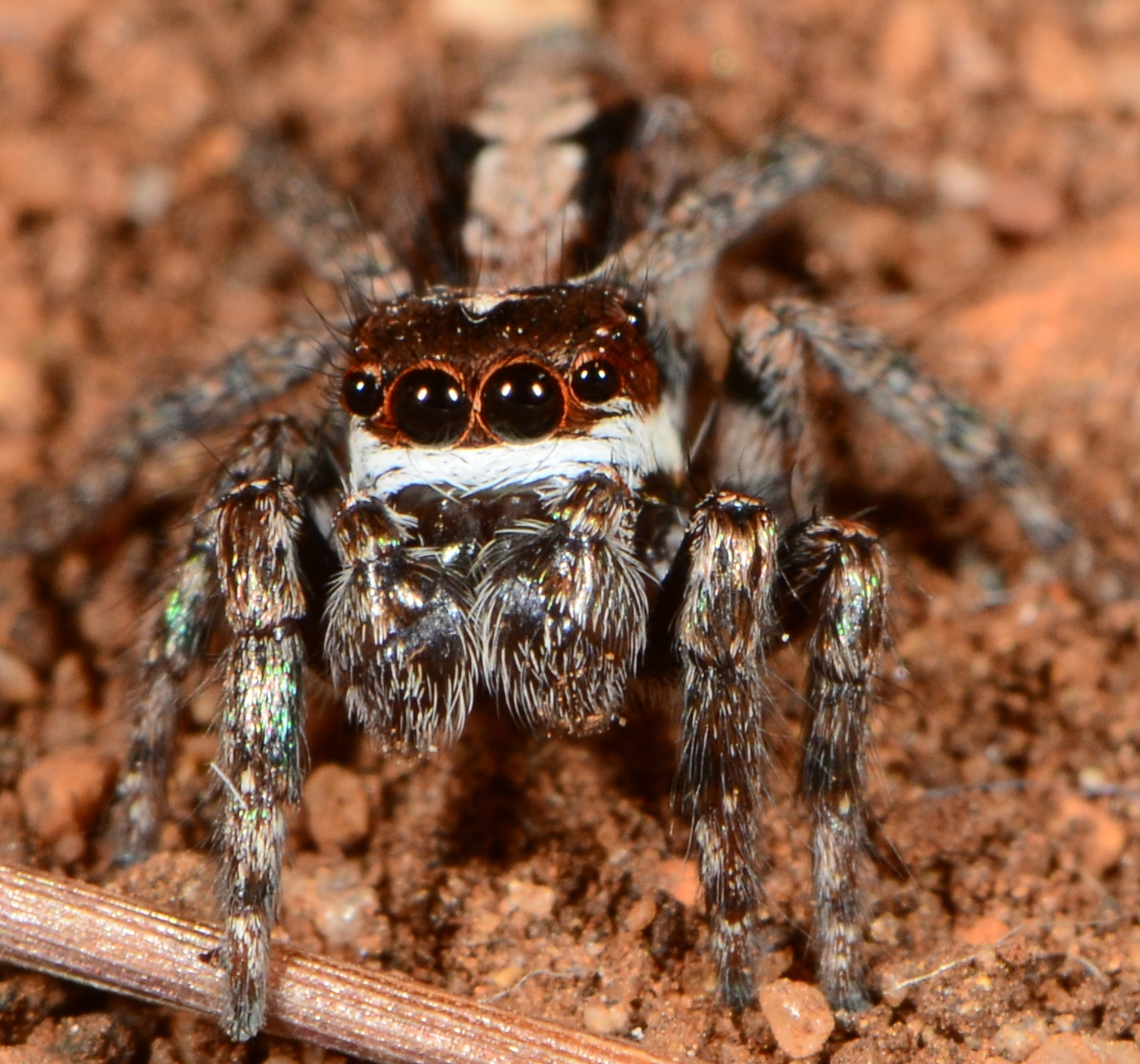
male

Icius insolidus is a small spider. The spider's body is divided into two main parts: a rather rounded almost rectangular cephalothorax and more pointed and ovoid abdomen. The male has an ovoid and moderately high carapace, the hard upper part of the cephalothorax, that is between 1.8 and 2.4 mm (0.071 and 0.094 in) long and between 1.3 and 1.9 mm (0.051 and 0.075 in) wide. It is very dark brown, nearly black, with a wide streak down the middle formed of white hairs, stripes on the sides and a scattering of grey hairs on its slopes. The eye field has a few brown bristles and short white hairs around the eyes. The spider's sternum, the underside of the carapace, is brown. Its face, the clypeus, is also brown and low with sparse white hairs. Its mouthparts are brown. The chelicerae have a few white hairs visible on the edges; they are large and unidentate with a very large tooth visible on the inner margin of the base. Its maxillae have yellow tips.

The male's oval abdomen is between 1.7 and 2.4 mm (0.067 and 0.094 in) long and between 1.3 and 1.6 mm (0.051 and 0.063 in) wide. It is black and hairy with a broad streak of white hairs on top and a slightly lighter underside. Its spinnerets are dark. Its legs are dark brown, the foremost pair being longer than the others. All the legs have long black hairs. The spider's pedipalps, sensual organs near its mouth, are small and dark. It can be distinguished from other spiders in the genus by its copulatory organs. The spider has an ovoid palpal bulb with a distinctive lobe to the rear. The embolus that projects from the top of the bulb is short and there is a single prominent apophysis, or spike, on the palpal tibia, the part of the pedipalp that connects to the bulb.

The female is similar in size to the male, with a carapace that is between 2.2 and 2.3 mm (0.087 and 0.091 in) long and typically 1.8 mm (0.071 in) wide and an abdomen that is between 2.2 and 2.4 mm (0.087 and 0.094 in) long and between 1.5 and 1.6 mm (0.059 and 0.063 in) wide. The spider's carapace is dark brown with thin, dense, black and grey hairs. Its black eye field has fawn and grey hairs, with very dark long bristles near the actual eyes. There are small patches of grey hairs between the eyes on the front row and rings of whitish scales around the middle eyes. It has a brown sternum and its clypeus is low and brown. Its chelicerae are smaller than those of the male with two teeth at the rear and one to the front. There is no basal tooth. Its labium and maxillae are also brown. Its abdomen is dark brown and covered with grey and brown hairs. It has an indistinct leaf-like pattern made of white hairs. The underside of its abdomen is lighter. It has greyish-brown spinnerets and its legs are yellow to pale brown, with short pale hairs and long spines. Its epigyne, the external part of the copulatory organs, has two widely separated rounded depressions. It has two copulatory openings that lead via heavily sclerotized insemination ducts, which have thick walls, to complex spermathecae, or receptacles.

From the outside, Icius insolidus looks like other spiders in the genus. The male can be most easily distinguished by the presence of the big tooth on inner margin of the bottom of the chelicerae. The shape of the palpal bulb is also distinctive. The female can be identified by the shape of its eipgyne. The male is particularly similar to the related Icius peculiaris, differing in have a shorter embolus and a different shape of the lobe on the palpal bulb. It is also similar to Icius hortensis, differing only in the tibial apophysis that is straight rather than curved.

== Behaviour ==
Jumping spiders are mainly diurnal hunters that use their good eyesight to spot their prey. Icius insolidus feeds on a range of prey, including bugs, flies, Hymenoptera, tangle-web spiders and wall crab spiders. It does not spin webs. Instead, it will stalk its prey and then pounce. The spider constructs nests made of spider silk and debris that is mounts on vertical walls. The female constructs a more substantial nest to the male, often next to each other. The female will undertake a courtship dance for the male, which will respond by mirroring. Mating lasts for about 3 minutes. After mating, the male and female will share a nest. The spider transmits vibratory signals through silk to communicate to other spiders.

== Distribution and habitat ==
Icius insolidus is considered endemic to southern Africa. The species is found in Namibia, Zimbabwe and South Africa. The holotype was discovered in Kimberley in South Africa. Specimens were found near Prieska in Northern Cape, South Africa, in 2002. It has subsequently been found in many parts of South Africa, including the areas around Bloemfontein, Brandfort, Fauresmith, Jagersfontein and Philippolis in Free State. Meanwhile, the first examples from Zimbabwe were found in 1998 in suburban Harare. The first specimen from Namibia was found in the Diamond Area. Examples were also identified in Etosha National Park. Others were discovered near Brandberg Mountain in 2000.

The species lives in rocky environments, typically on the faces of granite rocks or boulders. It frequently hides in crevices or under ledges. It can also be found on grass tussocks and on soils. In gardens, it is almost exclusively seen on stone, concrete or mortared brick walls. It thrives in these domestic settings, with a long-term sample making 320 observations over a nine-year period.
