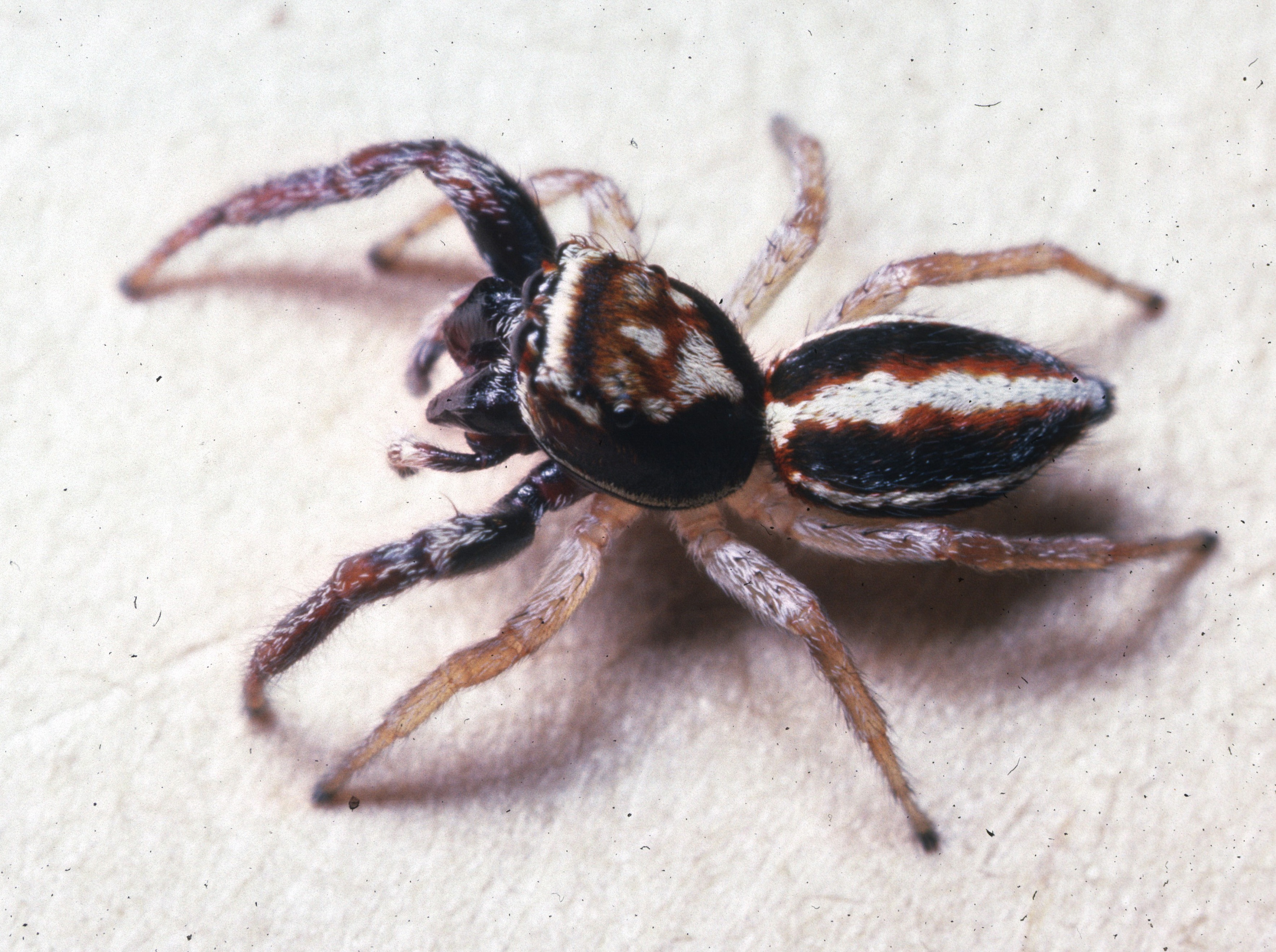
- Male Icius subinermis

Scientific classification
- Kingdom: Animalia
- Phylum: Arthropoda
- Subphylum: Chelicerata
- Class: Arachnida
- Order: Araneae
- Infraorder: Araneomorphae
- Family: Salticidae
- Genus: Icius
- Species: I. subinermis

Binomial name
- Icius subinermis Simon, 1937
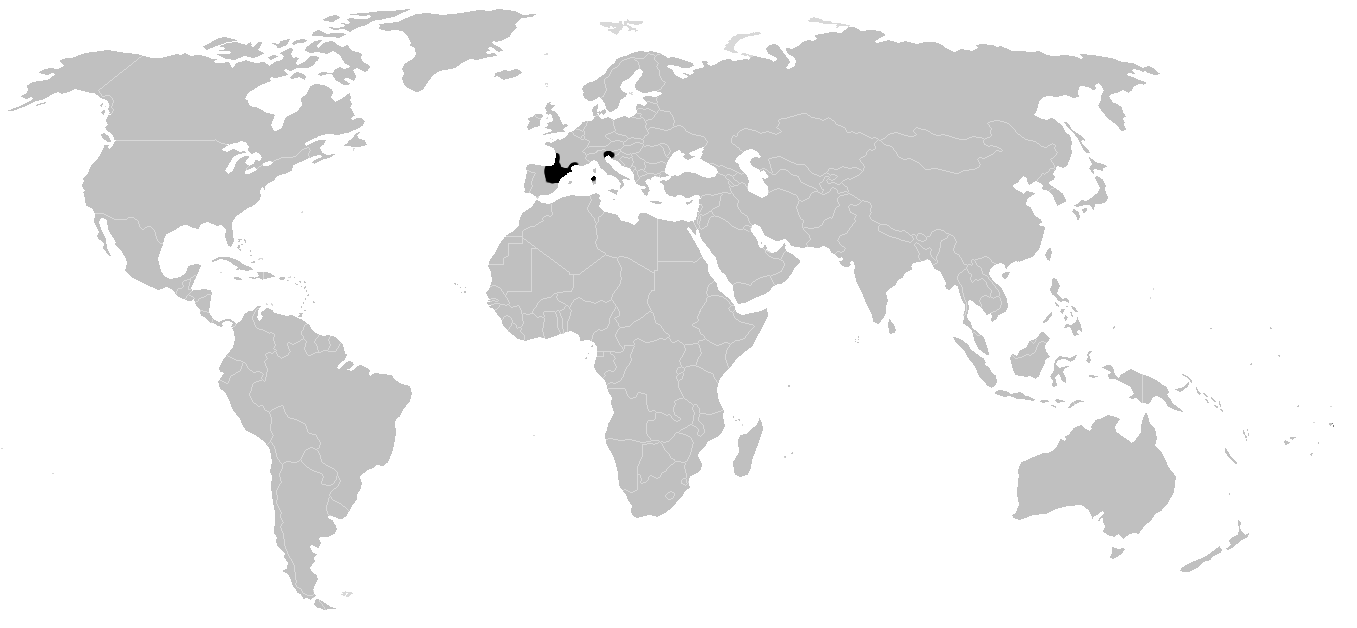
- approx. minimal distribution

Synonyms
- Icius notabilis (misidentified)

= Icius subinermis =

Species of spider

Icius subinermis is a species of jumping spider from the Mediterranean region.

== Description ==
The two sexes have different coloration.

== Biology ==
Icius subinermis favors moist habitats, for example near streams or on moist meadows. It builds a silken retreat in infructescences of rushes or under rocks near rivers or creeks. It will retreat there when the weather is unfavorable.

== Distribution ==
Although it is originally restricted to the western Mediterranean region, it has been occasionally found in greenhouses, for example in Cologne, Germany in 1995. Recently, it has been found in the center of Ljubljana, Slovenia, and there are records from Switzerland and Italy. An introduced North American population in Philadelphia, Pennsylvania, has been described.
