= Icius jacksoni =

Jackson's Icius Jumping Spider

Scientific classification
- Kingdom: Animalia
- Phylum: Arthropoda
- Subphylum: Chelicerata
- Class: Arachnida
- Order: Araneae
- Infraorder: Araneomorphae
- Family: Salticidae
- Genus: Icius
- Species: I. jacksoni

Binomial name
- Icius jacksoni Haddad & Wesołowska, 2024

Species of spider

Icius jacksoni is a species of spider in the family Salticidae. It is endemic to South Africa and is commonly known as Jackson's Icius jumping spider.

== Distribution ==
Icius jacksoni is known only from South Africa. The species has been recorded from the Northern Cape, specifically from Richtersveld National Park at Sendelingsdrift camp. It occurs at an altitude of approximately 912 m.

== Habitat and ecology ==
This species is a ground-dwelling spider.

== Conservation ==
Icius jacksoni is listed as Data Deficient by the South African National Biodiversity Institute. The status of the species remains obscure. More sampling is needed to collect the female.

== Taxonomy ==
Icius jacksoni was described by Haddad and Wesołowska in 2024. The species is known only from the male.
