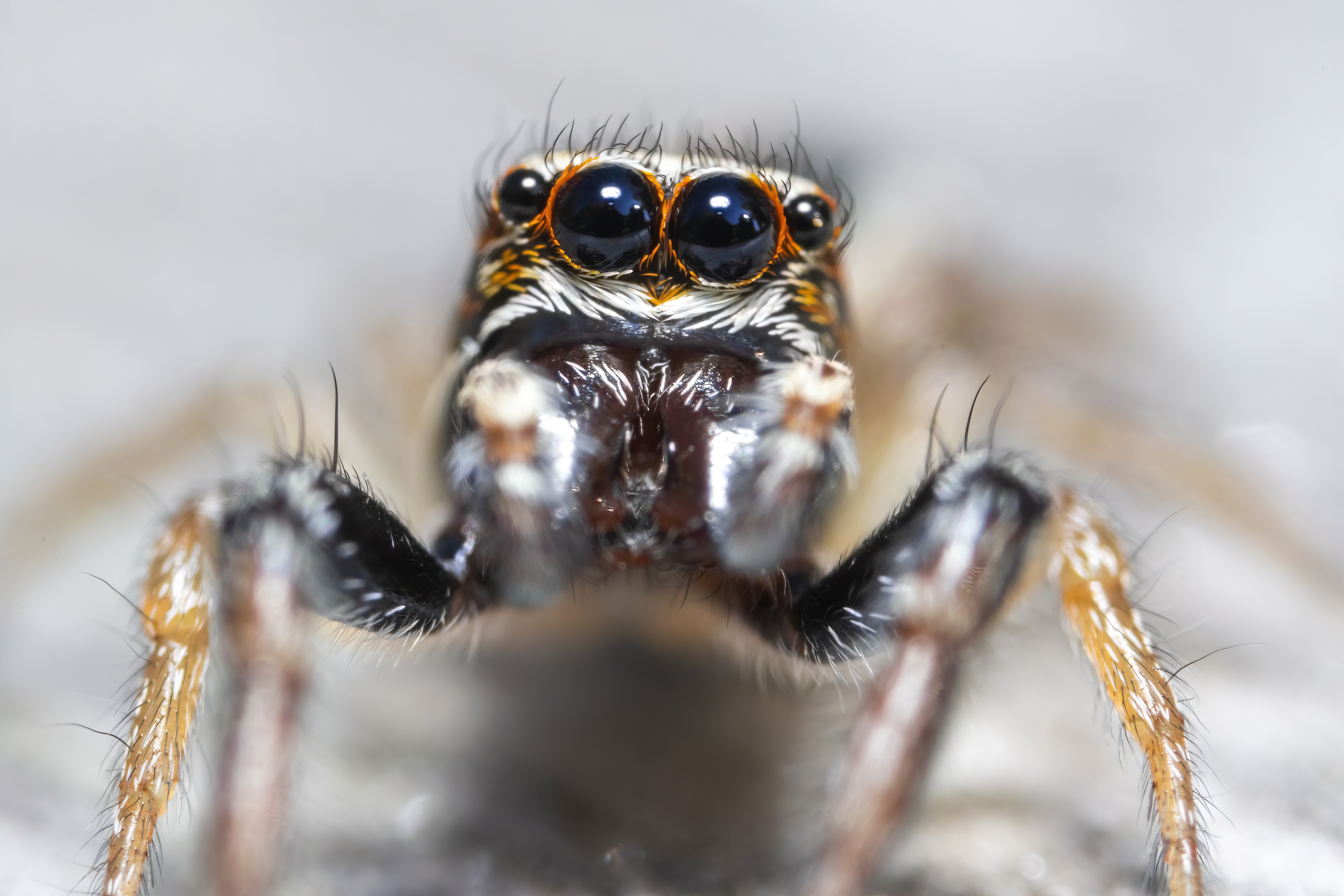
- A spider of the Icius genus

Scientific classification
- Kingdom: Animalia
- Phylum: Arthropoda
- Subphylum: Chelicerata
- Class: Arachnida
- Order: Araneae
- Infraorder: Araneomorphae
- Family: Salticidae
- Genus: Icius
- Species: I. peculiaris

Binomial name
- Icius peculiaris Wesołowska & Tomasiewicz, 2008

= Icius peculiaris =

Species of spider

Icius peculiaris is a species of jumping spider in the genus Icius that lives in Ethiopia. It was first described in 2008 by Wanda Wesołowska and Beata Tomasiewicz. Only the male has been identified. The spider is small, with a cephalothorax between 2.5 and 2.9 mm (0.098 and 0.114 in) long and an abdomen 2.6 and 3.0 mm (0.10 and 0.12 in) long. The spider is similar to the related Icius insolidus, although it has a longer embolus. It has a distinctive long chelicerae that sets it apart from other spiders in the genus, with one large pronounced and one hidden smaller tooth.

== Taxonomy ==
Icius peculiaris is a jumping spider was first described by Wanda Wesołowska and Beata Tomasiewicz in 2008. It was one of over 500 species identified by Wesołowska during her career. It was allocated to the genus Icius, raised by Eugène Simon in 1876. The genus name is based on two Greek words that can be translated distinct, or special, face. The species name is derived from the Latin word for peculiar. The genus is a member of the tribe Chrysillini, within the subclade Saltafresia in the clade Salticoida. Chrysillines, which had previously been termed heliophanines, are monophyletic. In 2016, Jerzy Prószyński split the genus from the Chrysillines into a group called Iciines, named after the genus. He stated the split was for practical reasons as Chrysillines had become unwieldy.

== Description ==
Icius peculiaris is a small spider. The male has a cephalothorax that ranges between 2.5 and 2.9 mm (0.098 and 0.114 in) in length and between 1.9 and 2.1 mm (0.075 and 0.083 in) in width. The pear-shaped carapace is a brown, of medium height, with short grey hairs. The eye field is darker, particularly around the eyes, which have black rings. The clypeus is low, with white and brown hairs. The long chelicerae have one large pronounced and a hidden smaller tooth. There are protruding light hairs at the base of the chelicerae. The labium is brown.

The abdomen is similar in size to the carapace, between 2.6 and 3.0 mm (0.10 and 0.12 in) long and between 1.5 and 1.9 mm (0.059 and 0.075 in) wide. It is a dark brown elongated oval with a indistinct pattern made of short stripes and spots. The underside is dark with two rows of light spots. The spinnerets are light brown. The front legs are long and reddish-brown, while the remainder are light brown. All are hairy. The pedipalps are yellow. The embolus is long and thin. The tibial apophysis, or spike, is straight and pointed. The palpal bulb is ovoid with a large semi-circular lobe with small areas of sclerotin.

The species has many similarities to others in the genus, particularly Icius insolidus. The palpal organs are similar, but Icius peculiaris has a longer embolus. The species is particularly distinguished from other Icius spiders by its distinctive chelicerae. The female has not been described.

== Distribution ==
Icius peculiaris is endemic to Ethiopia. The holotype was discovered in 1982 in Shewa near Addis Ababa.
