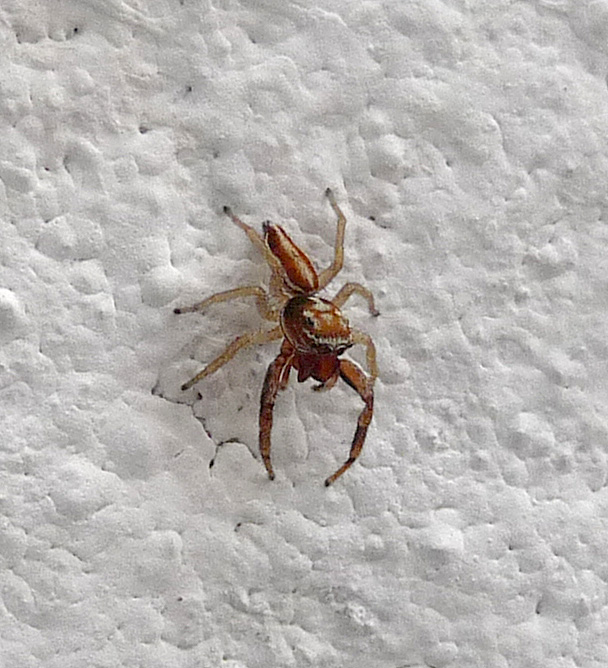
- A spider of the Icius genus

Scientific classification
- Kingdom: Animalia
- Phylum: Arthropoda
- Subphylum: Chelicerata
- Class: Arachnida
- Order: Araneae
- Infraorder: Araneomorphae
- Family: Salticidae
- Genus: Icius
- Species: I. mbitaensis

Binomial name
- Icius mbitaensis Wesołowska, 2011

= Icius mbitaensis =

Species of spider

Icius mbitaensis is a species of jumping spider in the genus Icius that lives in Kenya. It was first described in 2011 by Wanda Wesołowska. The spider lives communally in individual nests amongst other spiders and preys on insects, relying on its good eyesight to hunt diurnally. It is small, with a cephalothorax between 2.0 and 2.2 mm (0.079 and 0.087 in) long and an abdomen 2.2 and 2.7 mm (0.087 and 0.106 in) long. The female and male are similar in size and colouration of the carapace. The male abdomen is grey-brown with a faint pattern visible on some specimens. The female has a brown abdomen, sometimes more reddish-brown to the front, with some examples having a patch in the middle and spots to the back. The species is similar to other Icius spiders but differs in the size of the embolus and tibial apophysis of the male and the epigynal depression and pockets, seminal ducts and spermathecae of the female.

== Taxonomy ==
Icius mbitaensis is a jumping spider that was first described by Wanda Wesołowska in 2011. It was one of over 500 species identified by the Polish arachnologist during her career. The species had initially been named Pseudicius sp.2 by Robert Jackson in 1986. Wesołowska allocated it to the genus Icius, which had been raised by Eugène Simon in 1876. The genus name is based on two Greek words that can be translated distinct, or special, face. The species is named after the place where it was found. The genus was provisionally placed alongside Pseudcius, which, despite having superficially similar spelling, has a different etymology. In 1984, Ekaterina Andreeva, Stefania Hęciak and Jerzy Prószyński looked to combine the genera. The two genera have similar copulatory structures but work by Wayne Maddison in 1987 demonstrated that they have very different DNA. The genus is a member of the tribe Chrysillini, within the subclade Saltafresia in the clade Salticoida. Chrysillines, which had previously been termed heliophanines, are monophyletic. In 2016, Jerzy Prószyński split the genus from the Chrysillines into a group called Iciines, named after the genus. He stated the split was for practical reasons as Chrysillines had become unwieldy.

== Description ==
Icius mbitaensis is a small spider. The male has a cephalothorax that is between 2.1 and 2.2 mm (0.083 and 0.087 in) long and typically 1.6 mm (0.063 in) wide. The oval carapace is flattened, brown and covered in translucent hairs. The eye field is darker and irridescent, with a black area around the eyes themselves. The chelicerae are dark brown and unidentate. The labium is dark brown. The oval abdomen is similar in size to the carapace, typically 2.3 mm (0.091 in) long and 1.3 mm (0.051 in) wide. It is generally grey-brown, with occasional light streaks or faint lighter patches. The underside is lighter. The spinnerets are brown. The front legs are long and brown, while the remainder are yellow. All the legs have brown hairs. The pedipalps are brown. The embolus is long and bends back to the palpal bulb. The tibial apophysis, or appendage, is wide with a curved pointed tip.

The female is similar than the male, with a cephalothorax that is typically 2.0 mm (0.079 in) long and 1.6 mm (0.063 in) wide and an abdomen between 2.2 and 2.7 mm (0.087 and 0.106 in) long and between 1.4 and 1.5 mm (0.055 and 0.059 in) wide. The carapace is similar in colour, with white streaks on the edge extending to the clypeus. The abdomen is brown, although, in some examples, it has a reddish-brown tinge towards the front. Some specimens have a pattern of a large patch in the middle of the abdomen and two round spots to the back. Unlike the male, the front leg is the same width as the others. The epigyne has a heart-shaped depression which is flanked by large pockets of roughly the same length. The seminal ducts are long and the spermathecae are particularly long and thin.

The species is closely related to Icius steeleae. The male has a shorter tibial apophysis and longer embolus, while the female can be distinguished by the length of the seminal ducts, spermathecae and epigyne pocket and depression. The last two are particularly noticeable as they are equally long in the species, unlike other species in the genus. The female is also similar to Icius grassei, differing in the spacing of the copulatory openings.

== Behavior ==
Icius mbitaensis lives communally in large nests within the complicated interconnected webs of other spiders. Each spider lives in its own territorial nest within the complex. The males live with immature females in their nests until they are able to mate, at which time they perform complex courtship rituals. The courtship activity is vibratory in the nests and visual outside the nests. The males will also embrace each other when they meet. Like many jumping spiders, it does not spin webs to capture prey. Instead, it is mainly a diurnal hunter that uses its good eyesight to spot its prey. The spider preys on insects. As prey itself for the species Evarcha culicivora, there is no significant preference for the predator between spiders that eat mosquitoes that had blood inside them and those that do not. The spider uses visual displays during courtship and transmits vibratory signals through silk to communicate to other spiders.

== Distribution ==
Icius mbitaensis is endemic to Kenya. The holotype was discovered in 1998 on the banks of Lake Victoria. Other examples have also been found locally.
