= Icius desertorum =

Matjiesfontein Icius Jumping Spider

Scientific classification
- Kingdom: Animalia
- Phylum: Arthropoda
- Subphylum: Chelicerata
- Class: Arachnida
- Order: Araneae
- Infraorder: Araneomorphae
- Family: Salticidae
- Genus: Icius
- Species: I. desertorum

Binomial name
- Icius desertorum Simon, 1901

Species of spider

Icius desertorum is a species of spider in the family Salticidae. It is endemic to South Africa and is commonly known as the Matjiesfontein Icius jumping spider.

== Distribution ==
Icius desertorum is known only from South Africa. The species has been recorded from the Western Cape, specifically from Matjiesfontein. It occurs at an altitude of 912 m.

== Habitat and ecology ==
This species has been sampled from the Nama Karoo Biome.

== Conservation ==
Icius desertorum is listed as Data Deficient by the South African National Biodiversity Institute. The status of the species remains obscure. More sampling is needed to collect the male and determine the species' range.

== Taxonomy ==
Icius desertorum was described by Eugène Simon in 1901. The species is known only from the female.
