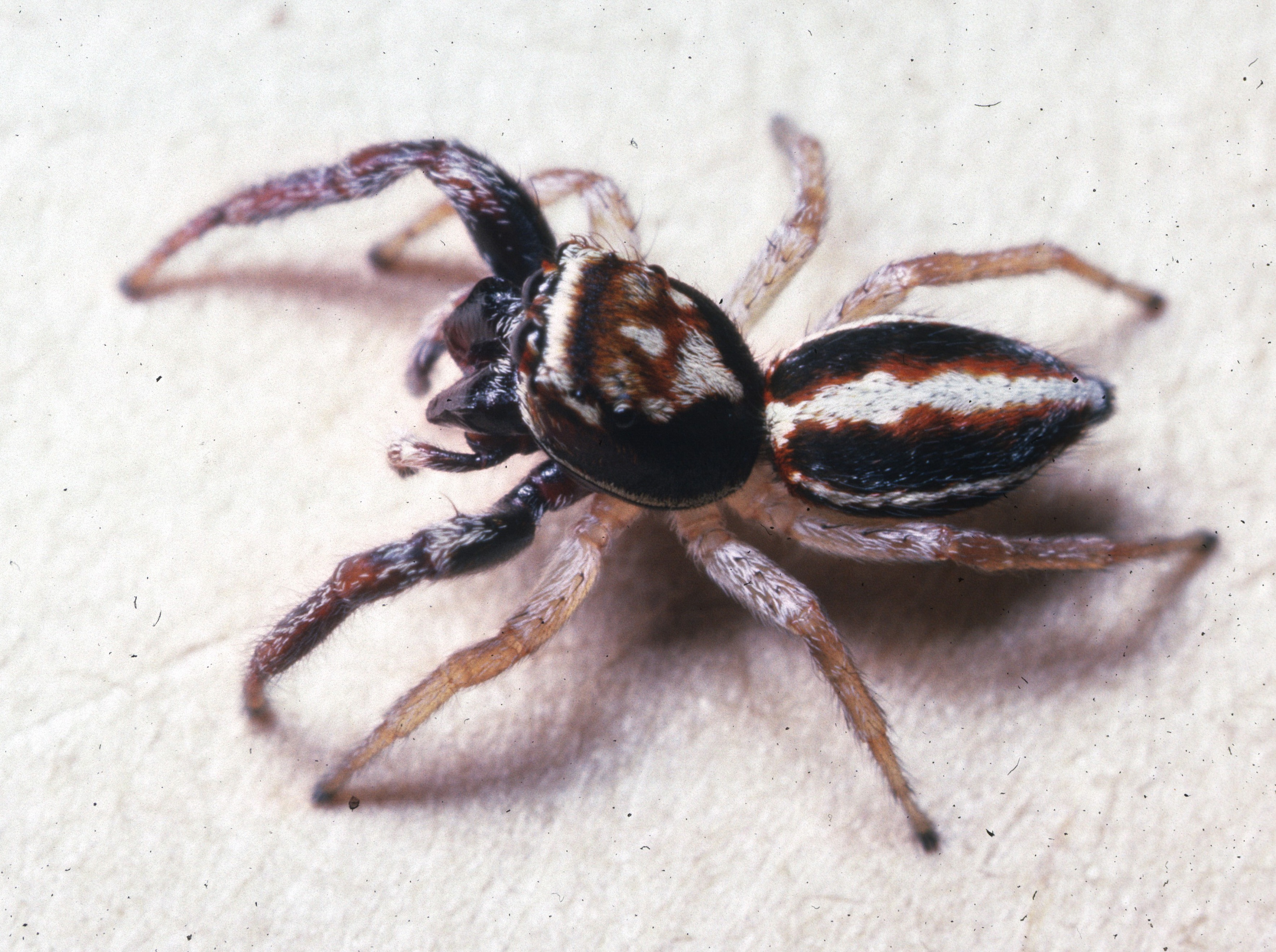
- male Icius subinermis
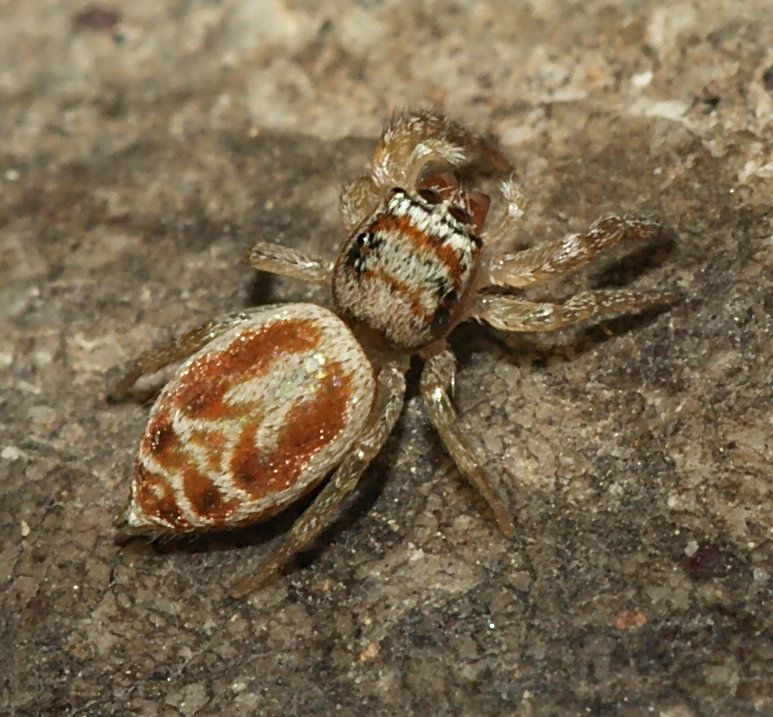
- female Icius congener

Scientific classification
- Kingdom: Animalia
- Phylum: Arthropoda
- Subphylum: Chelicerata
- Class: Arachnida
- Order: Araneae
- Infraorder: Araneomorphae
- Family: Salticidae
- Subfamily: Salticinae
- Genus: Icius; Simon, 1876

Type species
- Marpissa hamata C. L. Koch, 1846

Species
- See text.

= Icius =

Genus of spiders

Icius is a genus of jumping spiders described by Eugène Simon in 1876, belonging to the Order Araneae, Family Salticidae.

== Distribution ==
Icius is an almost cosmopolitan genus, widespread in Europe (mainly in Belgium, Croatia, France, Germany, Italy, Greece, Poland, Romania, Portugal, southern Russia, Slovenia, Switzerland, Spain and in The Netherlands), as well in Asia, Africa and in Central and South America (one species, Icius pallidulus is endemic of Micronesia).

== Species ==
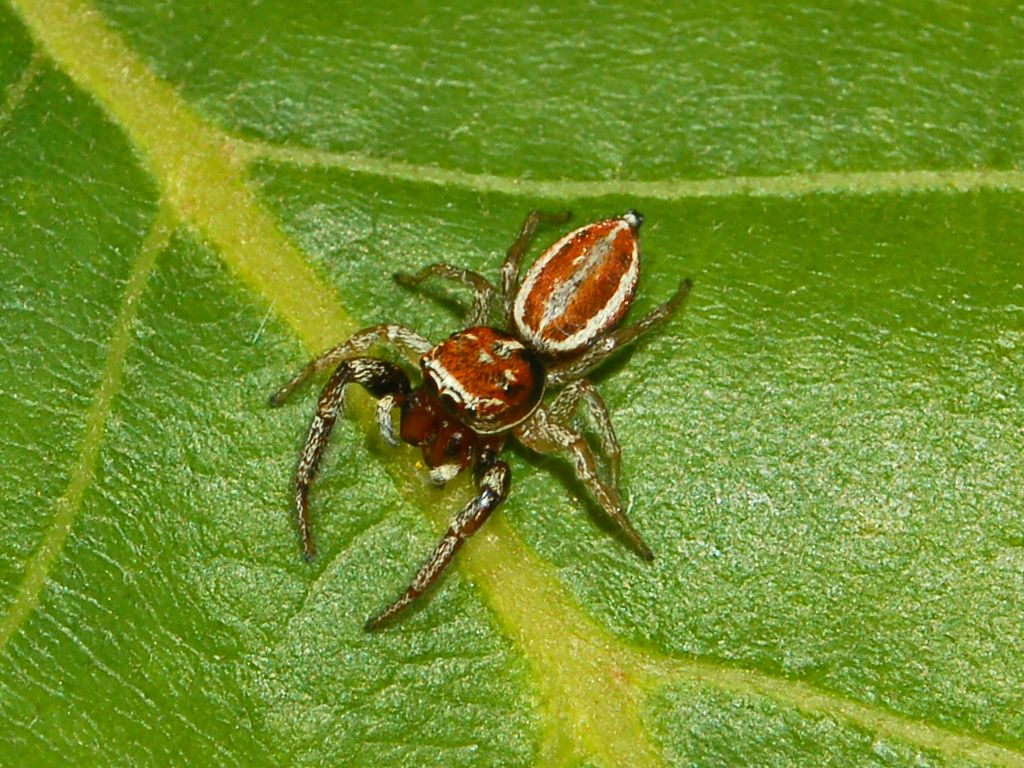
I. hamatus

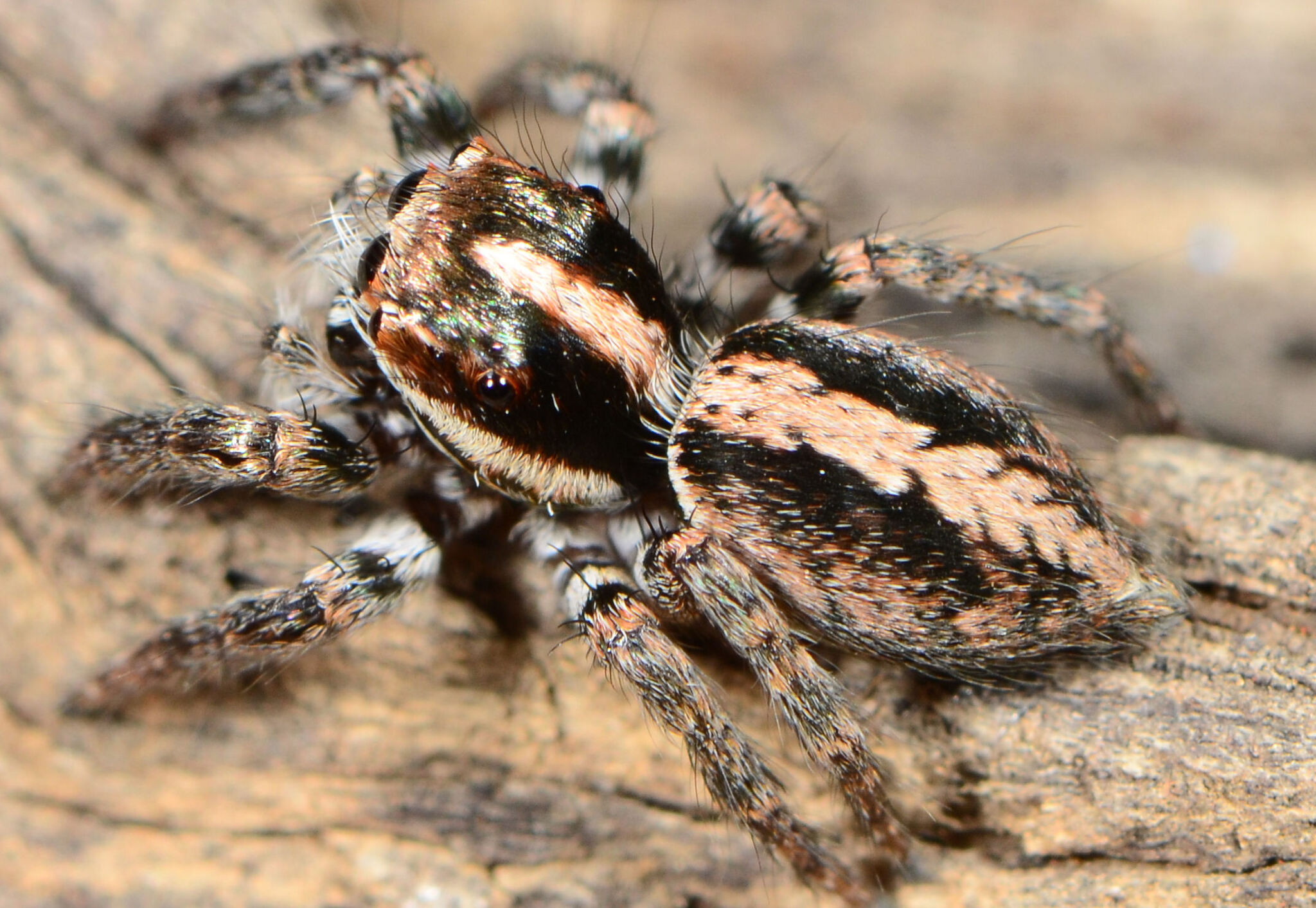
I. insolidus

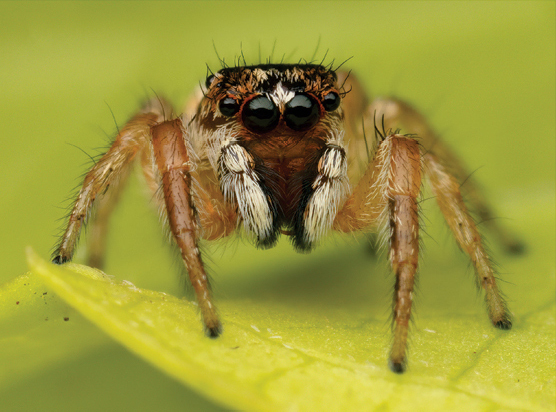
female I. pulchellus

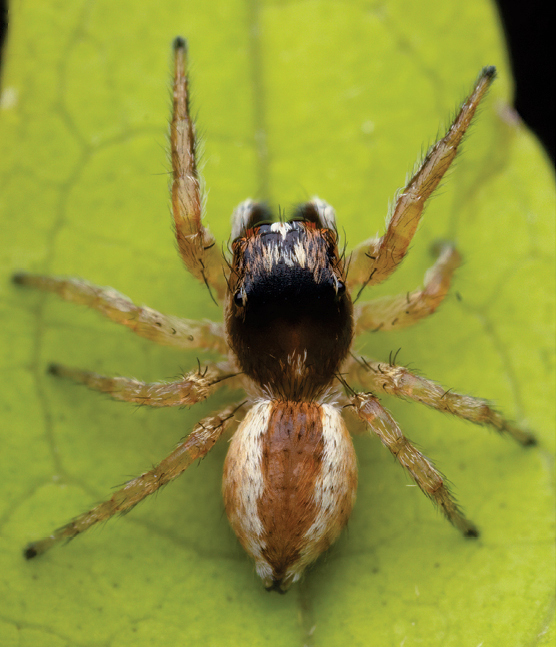
female I. pulchellus

As of October 2025, this genus includes 49 species:

- Icius abnormis Denis, 1958 – Afghanistan
- Icius alboterminus (Caleb, 2014) – Pakistan, India, Nepal
- Icius bamboo Cao & Li, 2016 – China
- Icius bandama Wesołowska & Russell-Smith, 2022 – Ivory Coast
- Icius bilobus Yang & Tang, 1996 – China
- Icius brunellii Caporiacco, 1940 – Ethiopia
- Icius cervinus Simon, 1878 – Russia (Europe)
- Icius congener (Simon, 1871) – Portugal, Spain, Andorra, France (Corsica), Italy, Malta, Algeria, Libya
- Icius crassipes (Simon, 1868) – Spain, Algeria, Tunisia
- Icius deergong Wang, Mi, Li & Xu, 2024 – China
- Icius dendryphantoides Strand, 1909 – South Africa
- Icius desertorum Simon, 1901 – South Africa
- Icius entebbensis Wiśniewski & Wesołowska, 2024 – Uganda
- Icius fagei (Lessert, 1925) – Tanzania
- Icius faker Yang & Zhang, 2024 – China
- Icius glaucochirus (Thorell, 1890) – Indonesia (Sumatra)
- Icius grassei (Berland & Millot, 1941) – Malawi, Nigeria, DR Congo, Kenya
- Icius hamatus (C. L. Koch, 1846) – Atlantic Is. North Africa, Southern Europe, Turkey, Georgia. Introduced to Western and Central Europe (type species)
- Icius han Yang & Zhang, 2024 – China
- Icius hortensis Wiśniewski & Wesołowska, 2024 – Uganda
- Icius ildefonsus Chamberlin, 1924 – Mexico
- Icius indicus (Simon, 1901) – India, China
- Icius inhonestus Keyserling, 1878 – Uruguay
- Icius insolidus (Wesołowska, 1999) – Namibia, Zimbabwe, South Africa
- Icius insolitus Alicata & Cantarella, 1994 – Algeria
- Icius jacksoni Haddad & Wesołowska, 2024 – South Africa
- Icius kui Yang & Zhang, 2024 – China
- Icius kulakangri Yang & Zhang, 2024 – China
- Icius kumariae Caleb, 2017 – India
- Icius mbitaensis Wesołowska, 2011 – Uganda, Kenya, Mozambique
- Icius menemeriformis (Strand, 1907) – Tanzania
- Icius minimus Wesołowska & Tomasiewicz, 2008 – Ghana, Ethiopia, Mozambique, China?
- Icius niger Peelle & Saito, 1933 – Russia (Kurile Is.)
- Icius nigricaudus Wesołowska & Haddad, 2009 – South Africa
- Icius ocellatus Pavesi, 1883 – East Africa
- Icius olokomei Wesołowska & Russell-Smith, 2011 – Nigeria
- Icius pallidulus Nakatsudi, 1943 – Micronesia
- Icius peculiaris Wesołowska & Tomasiewicz, 2008 – Ethiopia
- Icius pulchellus Haddad & Wesołowska, 2011 – South Africa
- Icius separatus Banks, 1903 – Hispaniola
- Icius simoni Alicata & Cantarella, 1994 – Algeria
- Icius steeleae Logunov, 2004 – Sudan, Uganda, Kenya
- Icius subinermis Simon, 1937 – Mediterranean, Germany, Hungary, Romania. Introduced to United States
- Icius testaceolineatus (Lucas, 1846) – Algeria
- Icius tukarami Prajapati, Kumbhar & Kamboj, 2021 – India
- Icius vikrambatrai Prajapati, Malamel, Sudhikumar & Sebastian, 2018 – India
- Icius yadongensis Hu, 2001 – China
- Icius zang Wang, Mi & Li, 2024 – China
- Icius zhengi Yang & Zhang, 2024 – China
