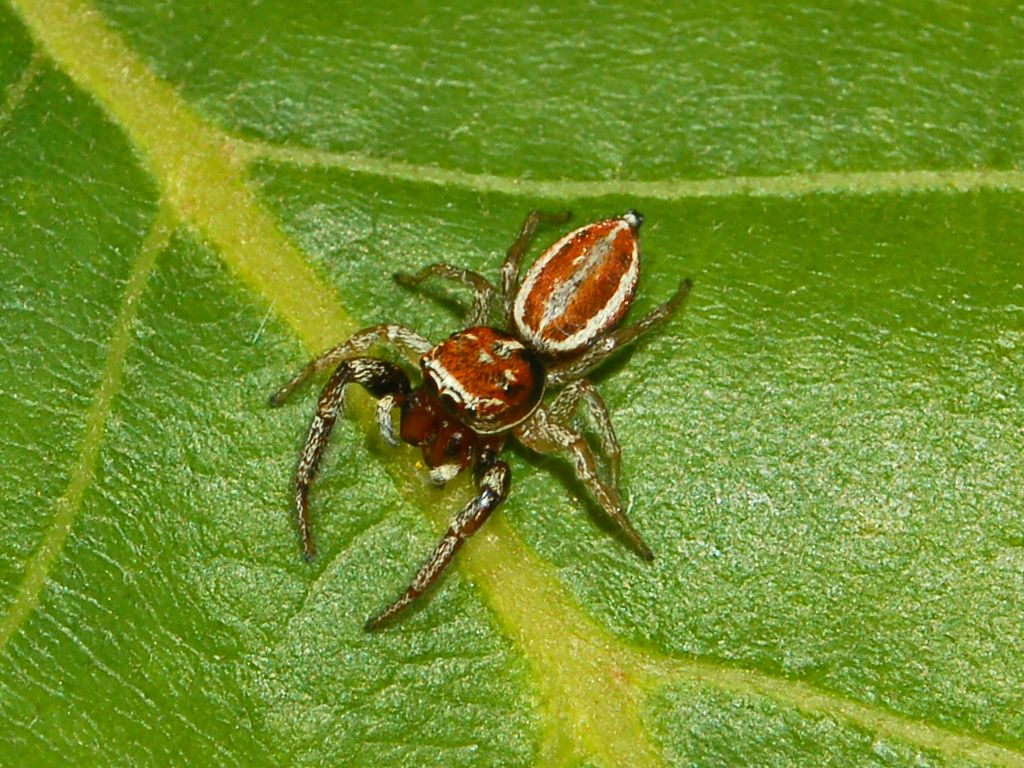
- Icius hamatus, male

Scientific classification
- Kingdom: Animalia
- Phylum: Arthropoda
- Subphylum: Chelicerata
- Class: Arachnida
- Order: Araneae
- Infraorder: Araneomorphae
- Family: Salticidae
- Genus: Icius
- Species: I. hamatus

Binomial name
- Icius hamatus (C.L. Koch, 1846)

= Icius hamatus =

Species of spider

Icius hamatus is a species of 'jumping spiders' belonging to the family Salticidae.

This species is mainly present in Portugal, Spain, France, Italy, Poland, Greece and Romania.

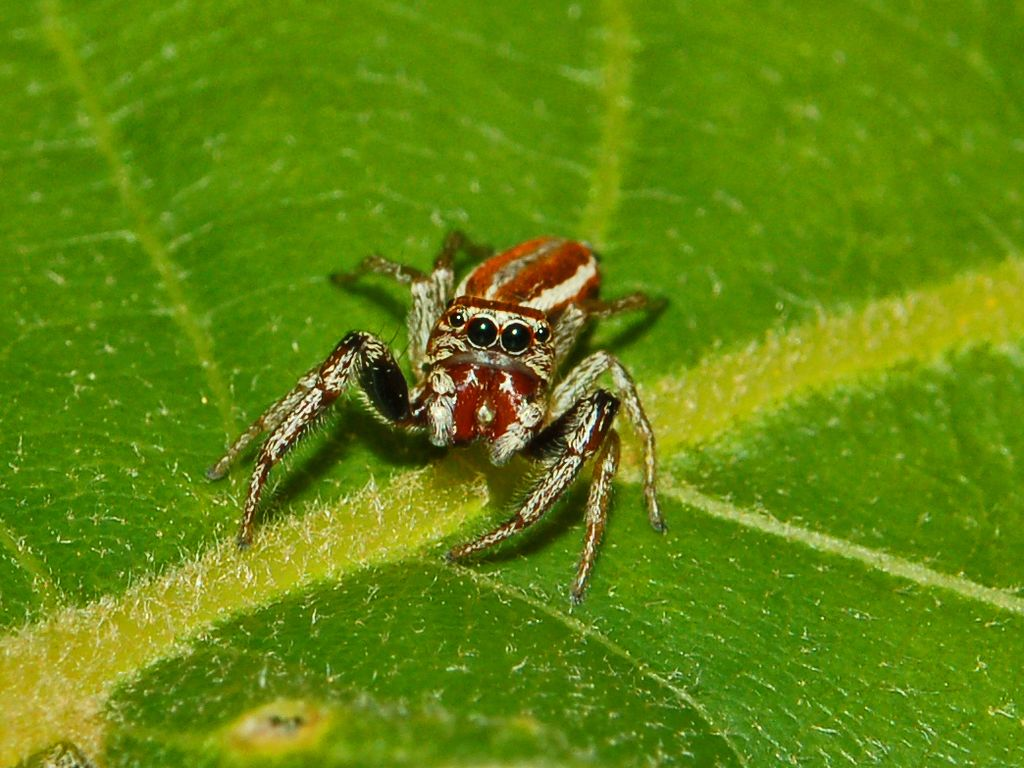
Icius hamatus - male, frontal view

Icius hamatus with prey (video, 2 min 7 s)

The adults of these spiders reach approximately 5–7 millimetres (0.20–0.28 in) of length. They prefer dry and hot habitats ("xerothermic") and can mainly be encountered on sunny bushes, shrubs and walls of houses (synanthropic organism), where they actively pursue their preys.

In males the basic color of the hairy body is rusty brown, with a white longitudinal stripe and a white line on the edge of the opistosoma. The prosoma is mainly rusty brown, while the pedipalps and the legs are whitish. In the females the basic color is mainly brownish or greyish, with darker markings. These spiders have eight eyes with very large anterior median eyes and smaller on each side. Their eyesight is excellent and very useful in their way of hunting.
