= Icius dendryphantoides =

Simonstown Icius Jumping Spider

Scientific classification
- Kingdom: Animalia
- Phylum: Arthropoda
- Subphylum: Chelicerata
- Class: Arachnida
- Order: Araneae
- Infraorder: Araneomorphae
- Family: Salticidae
- Genus: Icius
- Species: I. dendryphantoides

Binomial name
- Icius dendryphantoides Strand, 1909

Species of spider

Icius dendryphantoides is a species of spider in the family Salticidae. It is endemic to South Africa and is commonly known as the Simonstown Icius jumping spider.

== Distribution ==
Icius dendryphantoides is known only from South Africa. The species has been recorded from the Western Cape, specifically from Simon's Town. It occurs at an altitude of approximately 1 m.

== Habitat and ecology ==
This species is a free-living plant-dweller sampled from the Fynbos Biome.

== Conservation ==
Icius dendryphantoides is listed as Data Deficient by the South African National Biodiversity Institute. The status of the species remains obscure. More sampling is needed to collect the male and determine the species' range.

== Taxonomy ==
Icius dendryphantoides was described by Embrik Strand in 1909. The species is known only from the female.
