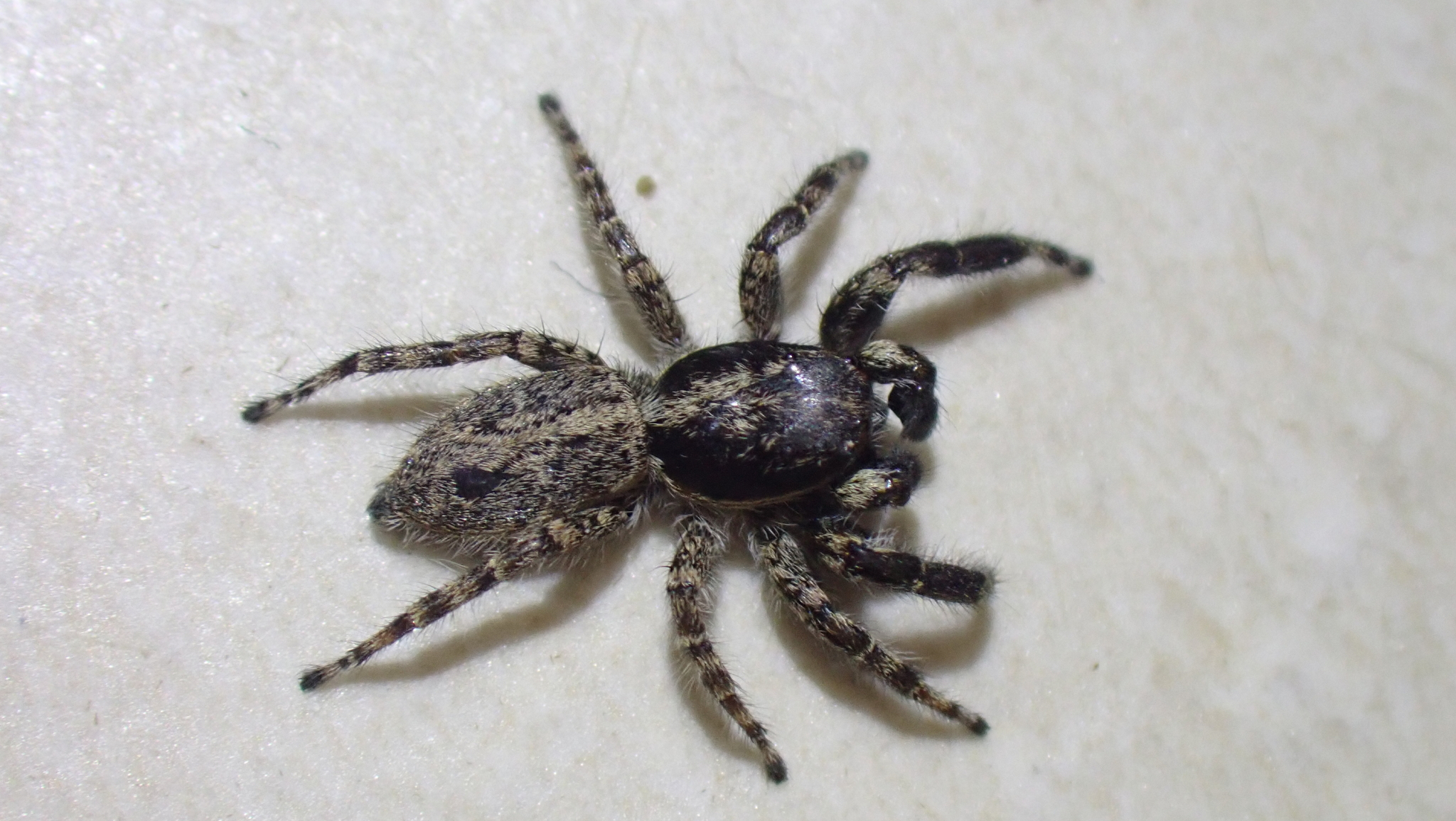
- male from France

Scientific classification
- Kingdom: Animalia
- Phylum: Arthropoda
- Subphylum: Chelicerata
- Class: Arachnida
- Order: Araneae
- Infraorder: Araneomorphae
- Family: Salticidae
- Genus: Menemerus
- Species: M. taeniatus

Binomial name
- Menemerus taeniatus (L. Koch, 1867)

Synonyms
- Attus taeniatus L. Koch, 1867; Menemerus falsificus Simon, 1868; Marpissus taeniatus Simon, 1868; Marpissus cinereo-taeniatus Simon, 1871; Philaeus taeniatus Simon, 1876; Menemerus parietinus Spassky, 1934; Deloripa canescens Mello-Leitão, 1944

= Menemerus taeniatus =

Species of jumping spider

Menemerus taeniatus is a species of jumping spider in the family Salticidae. It is native to the Mediterranean region and the Caucasus, and has been introduced to Argentina.

== Taxonomy ==
The species was first described by L. Koch in 1867 as Attus taeniatus based on specimens from Tinos, Greece. The following year, Eugène Simon independently described what he believed to be a separate species, Menemerus falsificus, from specimens collected in the Alps. However, modern taxonomic study has determined that these represent the same species, with M. falsificus now considered a junior synonym of M. taeniatus.

The species has undergone numerous taxonomic revisions and has been placed in several different genera over the years, including Marpissus, Philaeus, and Deloripa, before being definitively placed in Menemerus.

== Distribution ==
M. taeniatus is widely distributed across the Mediterranean region, extending eastward to the Caucasus. It has been recorded from countries including Greece, Italy, Spain, France, Turkey, and various Mediterranean islands. The species has also been introduced to Argentina, where it was initially described as the separate species Deloripa canescens.

== Habitat ==
This spider is commonly found on walls exposed to sunlight, particularly in Mediterranean coastal areas.

== Description ==
Like many jumping spiders, Menemerus taeniatus exhibits sexual dimorphism, with males and females showing distinct coloration and size differences.

Males are smaller, measuring 7 millimeters in body length. The cephalothorax is black with a white border and a broad white and yellow mixed band across the back. The sides have black and yellow mixed coloration. The front part of the head region is covered with yellow hairs, while the mandibles are black and the maxillae and lip are blackish-brown, with the former having yellowish-white tips. The sternum is brownish-yellow with white hairs.

The abdomen features a broad longitudinal yellow band mixed with white on the upper surface, bordered by zigzag stripes on both sides. The sides and underside are grayish-white with hairs. The spinnerets are brownish-yellow with black tips. The legs are brownish-yellow with the femur and patella sections having black tips and white hairs. All leg segments are brownish-yellow with black-tipped ends.

Females are larger, measuring 9.5 millimeters in body length. They have a grayish abdomen with a whitish band decorated with transverse lines, and brownish legs with thick anterior legs and ringed posterior legs in the male, while females have light yellow legs covered with white hairs.
