= Menemerus fulvus =

- Menemerus fulvus on a wall in Tokyo, Japan

Scientific classification
- Kingdom: Animalia
- Phylum: Arthropoda
- Subphylum: Chelicerata
- Class: Arachnida
- Order: Araneae
- Infraorder: Araneomorphae
- Family: Salticidae
- Genus: Menemerus
- Species: M. fulvus

Binomial name
- Menemerus fulvus (L. Koch, 1878)

Synonyms
- Hasarius fulvus L. Koch, 1878; Menemerus confusus Bösenberg & Strand, 1906; Menemerus sinensis Schenkel, 1963; Menemerus schensiensis Schenkel, 1963

Species of jumping spider

Menemerus fulvus is a species of jumping spider in the family Salticidae, found from India east to China and Japan. It is a flattened, grey-haired spider commonly seen on the outside walls of buildings, on fences and on tree trunks, and is one of the most frequently encountered jumping spiders in East and Southeast Asia.

== Taxonomy ==
The species was first described by the German arachnologist Ludwig Carl Christian Koch in 1878, in his account of the spiders and myriapods of Japan, under the name Hasarius fulvus. The specific epithet fulvus is Latin for "tawny" or "yellowish-brown".

The species has a tangled nomenclatural history. Wilhelm Bösenberg and Embrik Strand described the same spider from Japan as Menemerus confusus in 1906, and it was under that name that the species appeared in most Japanese, Chinese and Korean faunal literature for much of the twentieth century. Ehrenfried Schenkel added two further names in 1963, Menemerus sinensis and Menemerus schensiensis, both of which Wanda Wesołowska synonymised with M. confusus in 1981. In 1987 Jerzy Prószyński transferred Koch's Hasarius fulvus to the genus Menemerus and treated M. confusus as a junior synonym of it; he also synonymised M. brachygnathus, which was subsequently revalidated as a separate species by Piotr Jastrzębski in 1997. Jastrzębski confirmed the synonymy of M. confusus with M. fulvus in the same paper.

Syntype material of M. confusus is held at the Senckenberg Museum in Frankfurt am Main, and of M. sinensis at the Naturhistorisches Museum Basel.

== Description ==
Menemerus fulvus is a medium-sized, distinctly flattened jumping spider. Females reach a body length of about 8–10 mm and males about 7–9 mm. The body is dark beneath a dense covering of short grey and white hairs, so that living animals often appear pale grey; the sides of the body are darker. The carapace is low and flat with an almost straight front margin, and the legs are short and somewhat flattened. Conspicuous long white hairs on the pedipalps give the impression of a white beard or moustache, a feature reflected in the spider's Japanese and Chinese common names.

As in other members of the genus, the species is most reliably separated from its congeners by the copulatory organs: the form of the male palpal bulb and tibial apophysis, and the internal structure of the female epigyne.

== Distribution ==
The World Spider Catalog gives the range of M. fulvus as India to China and Japan. In China it is recorded from a wide range of provinces, including Hebei, Jiangsu, Anhui, Jiangxi, Zhejiang, Henan, Hubei, Hunan, Fujian, Guangxi, Guizhou, Sichuan, Yunnan and Hainan, as well as Taiwan. In Japan it occurs from Honshu south through Shikoku and Kyushu to the Ryukyu Islands. It is also recorded from Korea and from parts of Southeast Asia, including Malaysia.

== Habitat and behaviour ==
Menemerus fulvus is strongly synanthropic and is most often found on the exterior walls, shutters and boundary walls of houses, though it also occurs on tree trunks, on rocks along the coast and in open habitats generally. Individuals build a silken sac-shaped retreat in a crack or crevice and range over a territory centred on it. Like other salticids it does not build a capture web, instead hunting by sight during the day and stalking or ambushing small insects before seizing them in a short leap.

Males perform a display in which the first pair of legs is raised towards another spider. The display is used both in courtship and in contests between males.

The species is common in rice, cotton and other agricultural landscapes across China, where it has repeatedly been catalogued among the natural enemies of crop pests. It is harmless to humans.

== In research ==
Menemerus fulvus was one of four jumping spider species used as predators in a 2017 study of predator mimicry in metalmark moths published in Animal Behaviour. The researchers found that spiders confronted with the moth Brenthia coronigera — which combines eyespots, a raised-wing display posture and a jerky jumping gait — attacked it later and less often than non-mimetic moths, and that the spiders sometimes directed their leg-raising display at the moths, suggesting they had mistaken them for other jumping spiders.

== Names ==
In Japan the species is known as shirahige-haetori (シラヒゲハエトリ; "white-bearded jumping spider"), after the white hairs on its palps. Chinese names include 白鬚扁蠅虎 (báixū biǎn yínghǔ, "white-bearded flat fly-tiger") in Taiwan and 金黃扁蠅虎 in mainland usage. It has been listed in English as the "grey house jumper".
