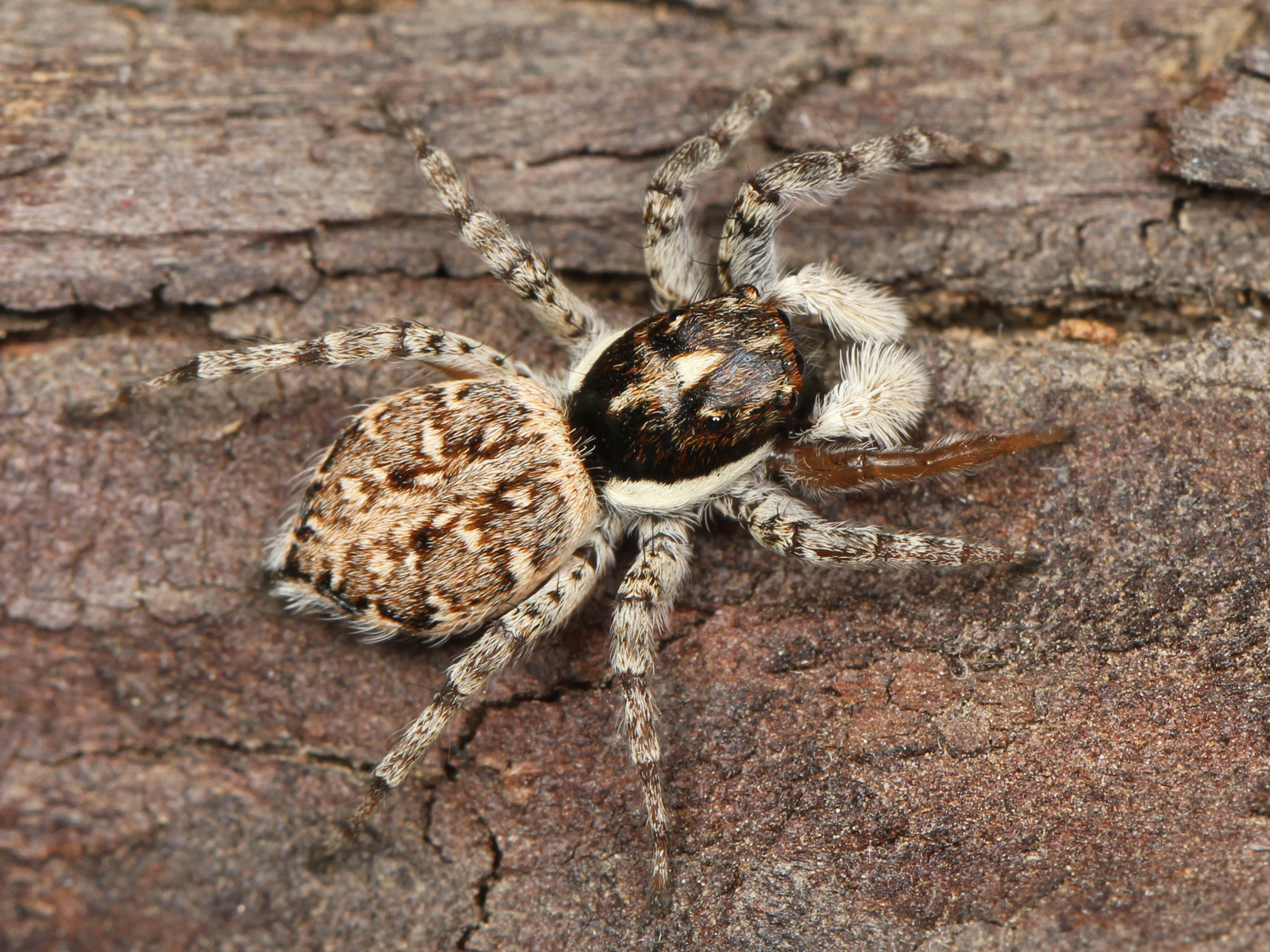
- female M. semilimbatus
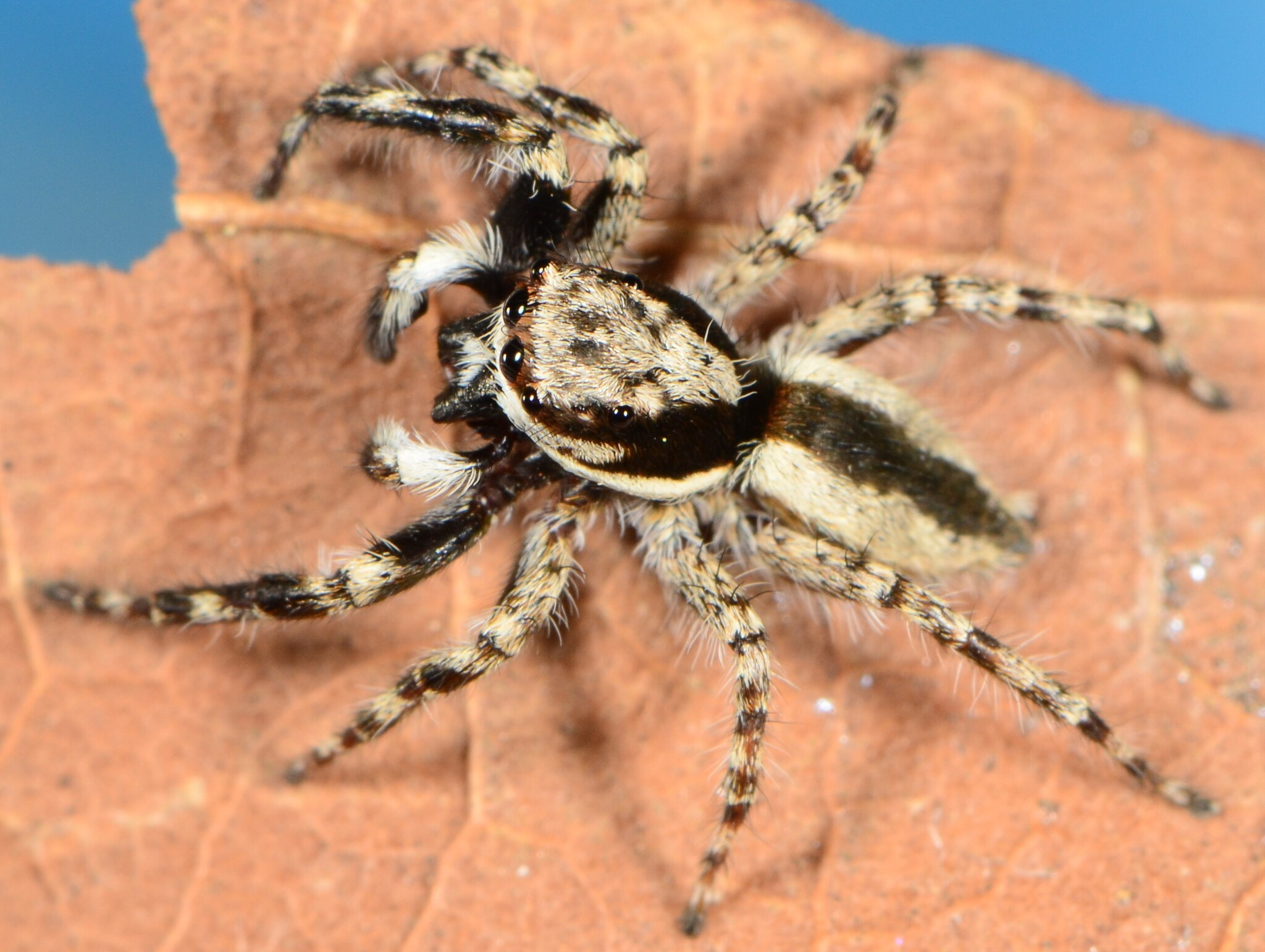
- male M. bivittatus

Scientific classification
- Kingdom: Animalia
- Phylum: Arthropoda
- Subphylum: Chelicerata
- Class: Arachnida
- Order: Araneae
- Infraorder: Araneomorphae
- Family: Salticidae
- Subfamily: Salticinae
- Genus: Menemerus; Simon, 1868

Type species
- M. semilimbatus (Hahn, 1829)

Species
- 64, see text

Synonyms
- Camponia Badcock, 1932; Stridulattus Petrunkevitch, 1926

= Menemerus =

Genus of spiders

Menemerus is a genus of jumping spiders that was first described by Eugène Louis Simon in 1868. They are 4 to 10 millimetres (0.16 to 0.39 in) long, flattened in shape, and very hairy, usually with brown and grayish hairs. Most species have white edges on the thorax. The abdomen is often oval, or sometimes elongated or rounded.

== Distribution ==
Menemerus are found worldwide in warmer climates.

== Species ==
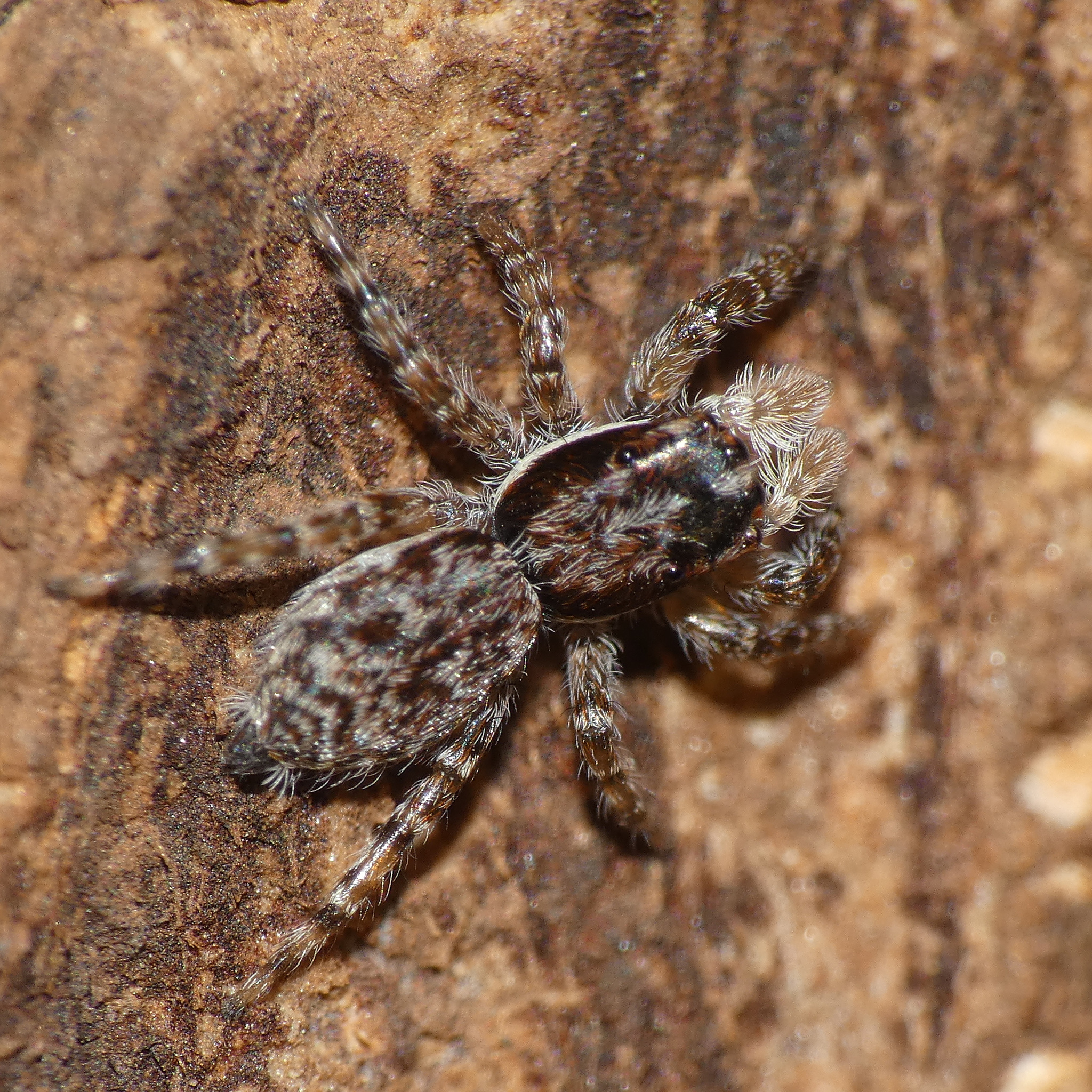
M. bifurcus

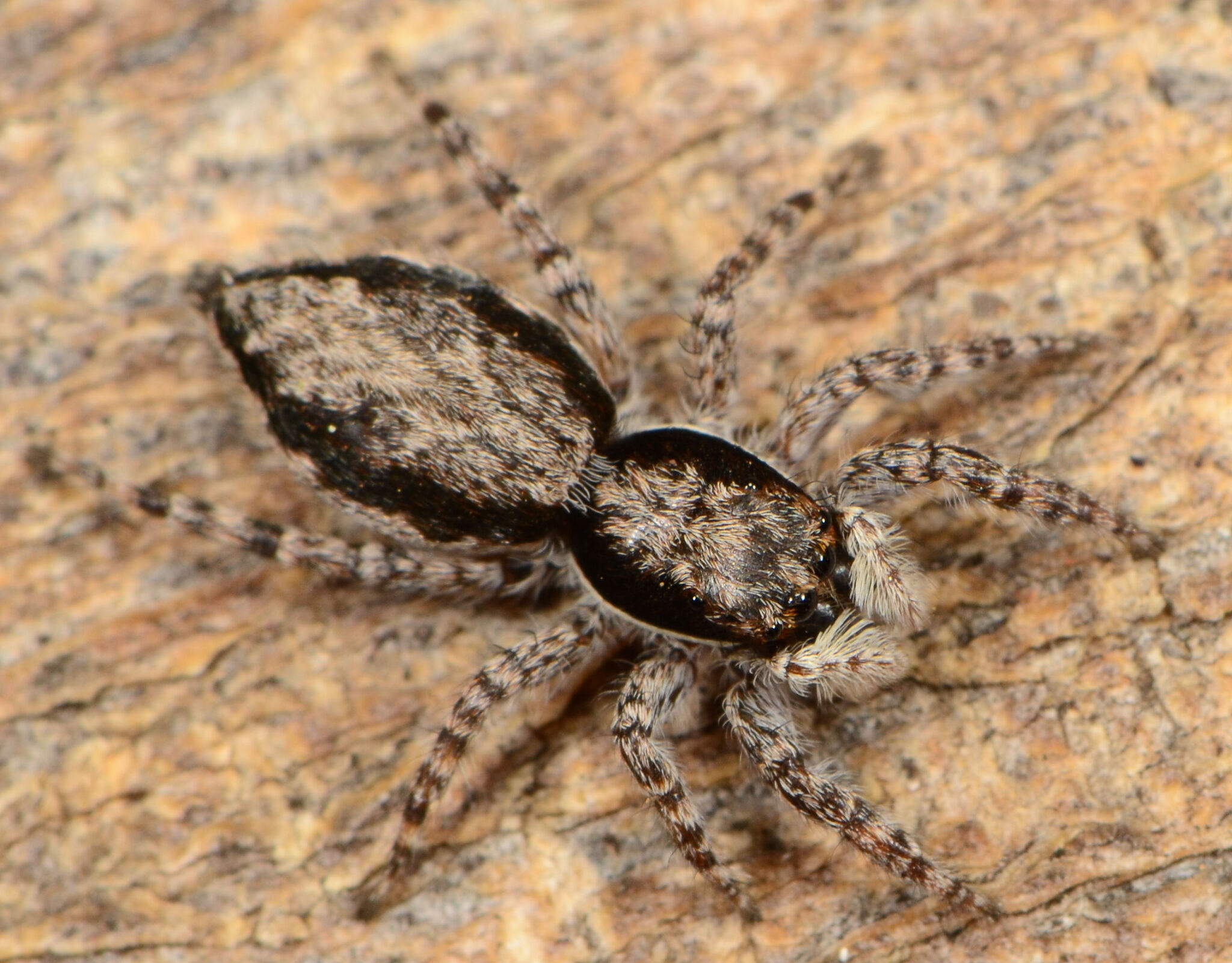
M. eburnensis

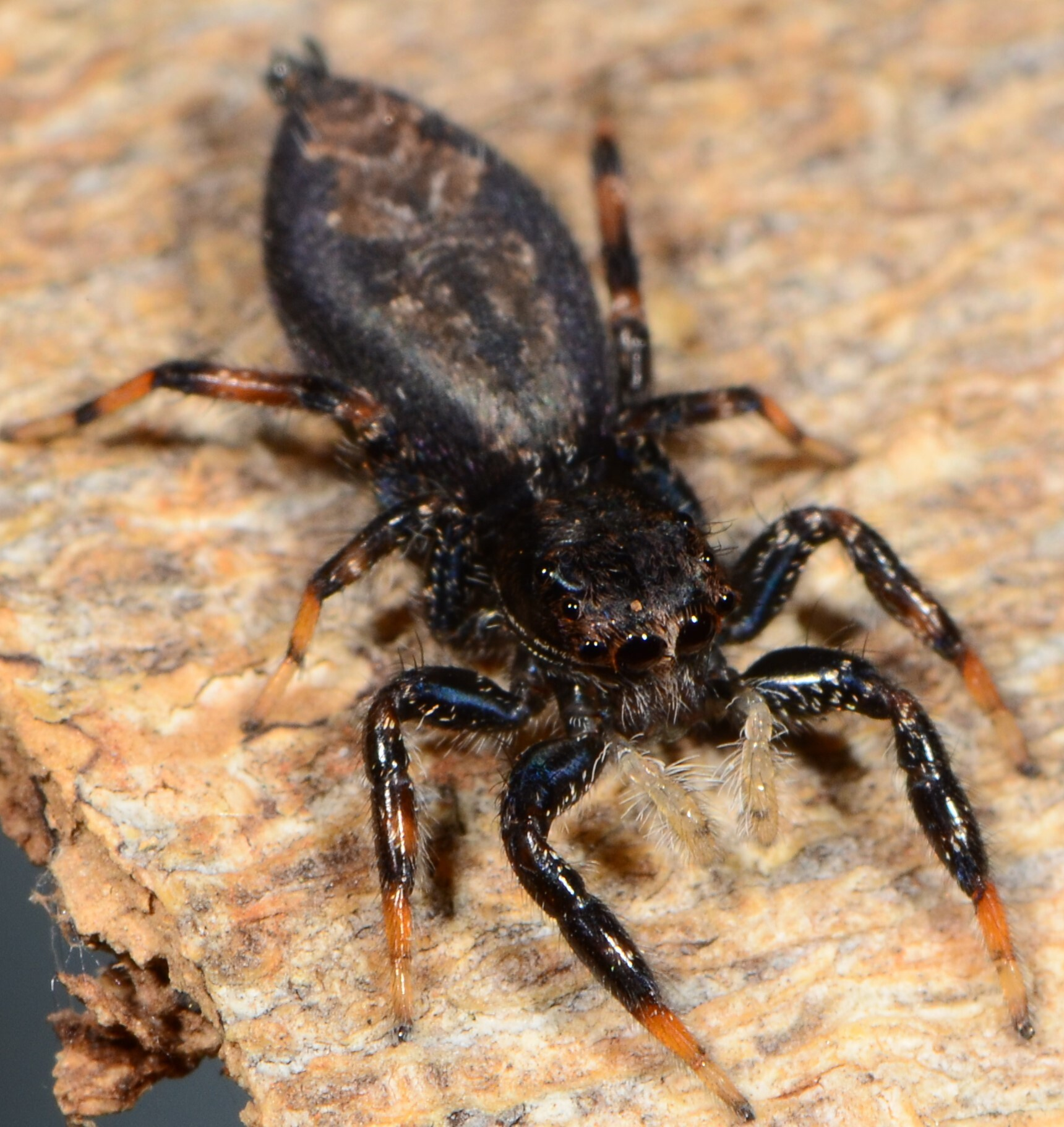
M. fagei

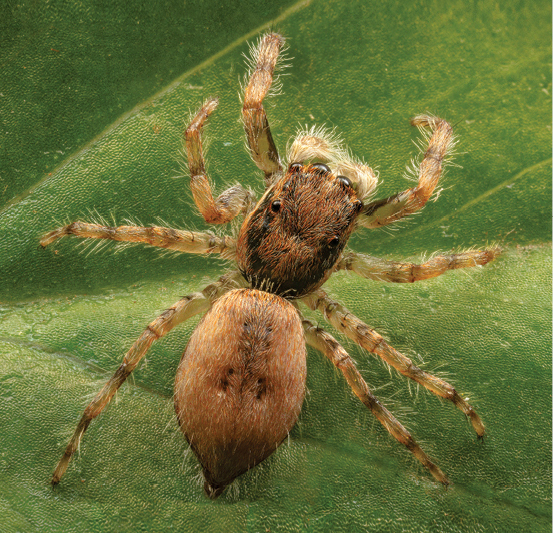
M. foordi

As of October 2025, this genus includes 64 species:

- Menemerus affinis Wesołowska & van Harten, 2010 – United Arab Emirates
- Menemerus animatus O. Pickard-Cambridge, 1876 – Senegal, Mauritania, Mali, North Africa, Sudan, Greece, Turkey, Yemen, Saudi Arabia, Iraq
- Menemerus arabicus Prószyński, 1993 – Saudi Arabia
- Menemerus bicolor G. W. Peckham & E. G. Peckham, 1896 – Guatemala
- Menemerus bifurcus Wesołowska, 1999 – Southern Africa
- Menemerus bivittatus (Dufour, 1831) – Africa. Introduced to North, Central and South America, St. Helena, southern Europe, Turkey, India, China, Taiwan, Japan, Vietnam, Australia, Pacific Islands
- Menemerus brachygnathus (Thorell, 1887) – India to China, Japan and Malaysia. Introduced to Argentina
- Menemerus brevibulbis (Thorell, 1887) – Senegal to India
- Menemerus carlini (G. W. Peckham & E. G. Peckham, 1903) – Zimbabwe, South Africa
- Menemerus congoensis Lessert, 1927 – Sudan to South Africa
- Menemerus cummingorum Wesołowska, 2007 – Zimbabwe
- Menemerus davidi Prószyński & Wesołowska, 1999 – North Africa, Israel, Jordan
- Menemerus desertus Wesołowska, 1999 – Algeria
- Menemerus dimidius (Schmidt, 1976) – Canary Islands
- Menemerus dubius Berland & Millot, 1941 – Guinea, Ivory Coast, Uganda
- Menemerus eburnensis Berland & Millot, 1941 – Senegal, Guinea, Ivory Coast
- Menemerus errabundus Logunov, 2010 – Israel, Iran
- Menemerus fagei Berland & Millot, 1941 – Canary Islands, West Africa, Algeria, Malta, Cyprus, Egypt, Sudan, Ethiopia, Djibouti, Yemen, Israel
- Menemerus felix Hogg, 1922 – Vietnam
- Menemerus foordi Haddad & Wesołowska, 2024 – South Africa
- Menemerus formosus Wesołowska, 1999 – Kenya
- Menemerus fulvus (L. Koch, 1878) – India to China and Japan
- Menemerus guttatus Wesołowska, 1999 – Morocco
- Menemerus illigeri (Audouin, 1826) – Portugal, North Africa, Middle East, St. Helena
- Menemerus kochi Bryant, 1942 – Virgin Islands
- Menemerus legalli Berland & Millot, 1941 – Mali
- Menemerus legendrei Schenkel, 1963 – China
- Menemerus lesnei Lessert, 1936 – Namibia, Botswana, Mozambique, Zimbabwe
- Menemerus lesserti Lawrence, 1927 – Namibia, Zimbabwe, South Africa
- Menemerus lobatus Wesołowska & Henrard, 2025 – Guinea
- Menemerus magnificus Wesołowska, 1999 – Cameroon
- Menemerus marginalis (Banks, 1909) – Costa Rica
- Menemerus marginatus (Kroneberg, 1875) – Caucasus (Russia, Azerbaijan), Kazakhstan, United Arab Emirates, Iran, Central Asia, Afghanistan, Pakistan, India
- Menemerus meridionalis Wesołowska, 1999 – South Africa
- Menemerus minshullae Wesołowska, 1999 – Zimbabwe, Malawi, South Africa
- Menemerus mirabilis Wesołowska, 1999 – Ethiopia
- Menemerus modestus Wesołowska, 1999 – Algeria, Tunisia
- Menemerus namibicus Wesołowska, 1999 – Namibia
- Menemerus natalis Wesołowska, 1999 – South Africa
- Menemerus niangbo Wesołowska & Russell-Smith, 2022 – Ivory Coast
- Menemerus nigeriensis Wesołowska & Russell-Smith, 2011 – Nigeria
- Menemerus nigli Wesołowska & Freudenschuss, 2012 – Pakistan, India, Thailand. Introduced to Brazil
- Menemerus pallescens Wesołowska & van Harten, 2007 – Yemen
- Menemerus paradoxus Wesołowska & van Harten, 1994 – Yemen
- Menemerus patellaris Wesołowska & van Harten, 2007 – Yemen
- Menemerus pentamaculatus Hu, 2001 – China
- Menemerus pilosus Wesołowska, 1999 – Namibia, South Africa
- Menemerus placidus Wesołowska, 1999 – Namibia
- Menemerus plenus Wesołowska & van Harten, 1994 – Yemen
- Menemerus pulcher Wesołowska, 1999 – Mauritania
- Menemerus rabaudi Berland & Millot, 1941 – Guinea
- Menemerus regius Wesołowska, 1999 – Ethiopia
- Menemerus rubicundus Lawrence, 1928 – Namibia, South Africa
- Menemerus sabulosus Wesołowska, 1999 – Namibia
- Menemerus semilimbatus (Hahn, 1829) – Canary Islands, Mediterranean, Eastern Europe, Turkey, Caucasus, Iran. Introduced to Argentina, Chile, United States (type species)
- Menemerus sengleti Logunov, 2023 – Iran
- Menemerus soldani (Audouin, 1826) – Algeria, Tunisia, Egypt
- Menemerus taeniatus (L. Koch, 1867) – Mediterranean to Caucasus. Introduced to Argentina
- Menemerus transvaalicus Wesołowska, 1999 – South Africa, Lesotho
- Menemerus tropicus Wesołowska, 2007 – Uganda, Kenya
- Menemerus utilis Wesołowska, 1999 – Tunisia
- Menemerus vernei Berland & Millot, 1941 – Guinea
- Menemerus wuchangensis Schenkel, 1963 – China
- Menemerus zimbabwensis Wesołowska, 1999 – Zimbabwe, South Africa
