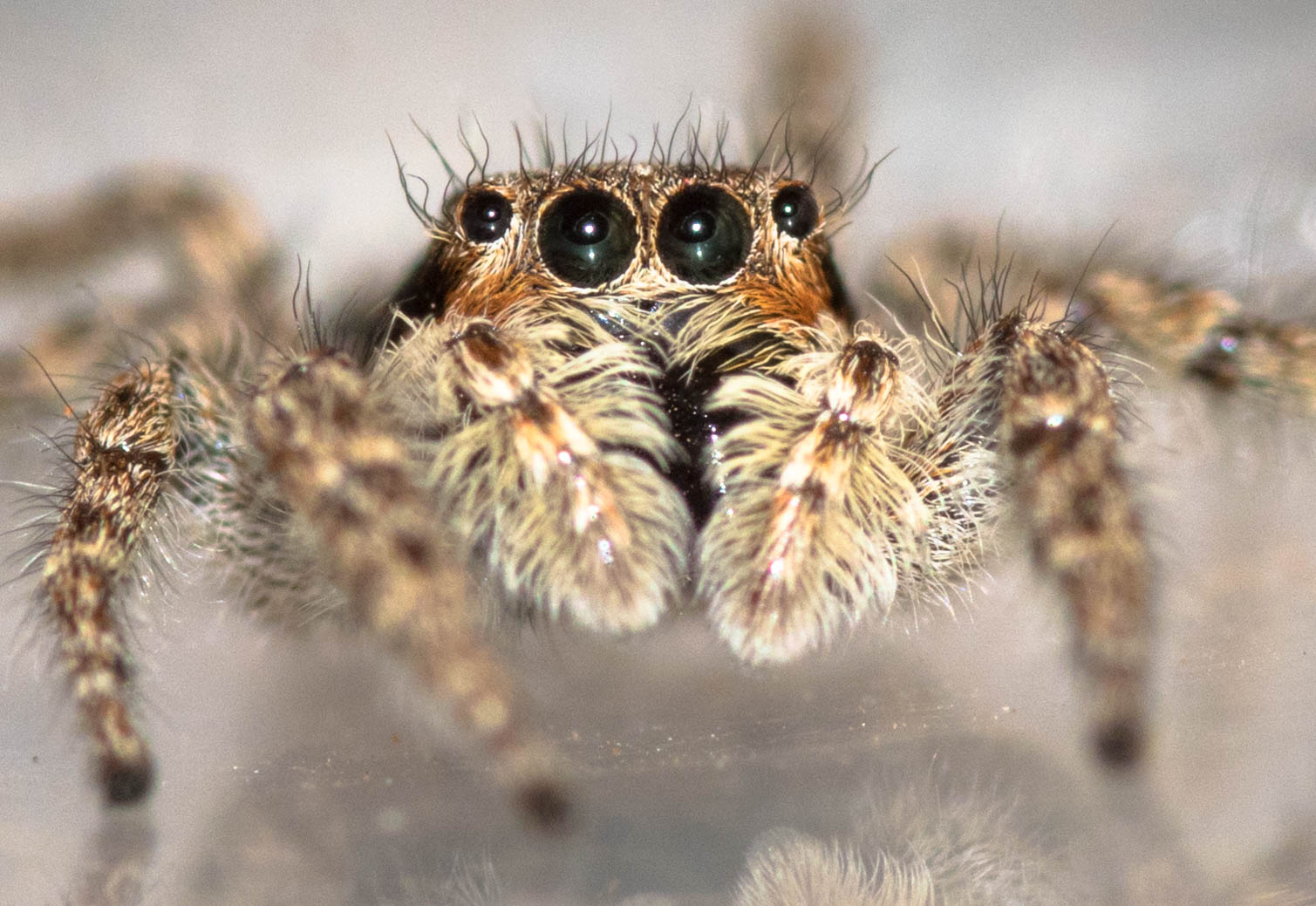
- A spider of the Menemerus genus from South Africa

Conservation status
- Least Concern (IUCN 3.1)

Scientific classification
- Kingdom: Animalia
- Phylum: Arthropoda
- Subphylum: Chelicerata
- Class: Arachnida
- Order: Araneae
- Infraorder: Araneomorphae
- Family: Salticidae
- Genus: Menemerus
- Species: M. natalis

Binomial name
- Menemerus natalis Wesołowska, 1999

= Menemerus natalis =

Species of spider

Menemerus natalis , the Natal Menemerus Jumping Spider, is a species of jumping spider in the genus Menemerus that lives in South Africa. The species was first described in 1999 by Wanda Wesołowska based on a holotype found in KwaZulu-Natal. The spider is medium-sized, with a carapace that is between 3.1 and 3.3 millimetres (0.12 and 0.13 in) long and an abdomen between 2.0 and 2.3 mm (0.08 and 0.09 in) long. The carapace is very dark brown, nearly black.while the abdomen is russet-brown. There are three white dots between the eyes on the black eye field. Otherwise, it is its copulatory organs that most distinguish the species from others in the genus. The male has a long embolus and small narrow tibia. The female has not been described.

== Taxonomy ==
Menemerus natalis is a species of jumping spider that was first described by Wanda Wesołowska in 1999. It is also known as the Natal Menemerus Jumping Spider. It was one of over 500 species identified by the Polish arachnologist during her career, making her one of the most prolific in the field. She allocated the spider to the genus Menemerus. The genus was circumscribed in 1868 by Eugène Simon and contains over 60 species. The genus name derives from two Greek words, meaning certainly and diurnal. The species is named for the province where it was first found.

Genetic analysis has shown that Menemerus is related to the genera Helvetia and Phintella. The genus shares some characteristics with the genera Hypaeus and Pellenes. It was placed in the tribe Heliophaninae and then, when that tribe was renamed by Wayne Maddison in 2015, Chrysillini. The tribe is ubiquitous across most continents of the world. It is allocated to the subclade Saltafresia in the clade Salticoida. In 2016, Jerzy Prószyński created a group of genera named Menemerines after the genus. The vast majority of the species in Menemerines are members of the genus, with additional examples from Kima and Leptorchestes.

== Description ==
Menemerus natalis is a medium-sized spider. The male has a dark brown, nearly black, flattened carapace that is ranges from 3.1 to 3.3 mm (0.12 to 0.13 in) in length and between 2.1 and 2.3 mm (0.08 and 0.09 in) in width. It has a scattering of white hairs that form lines on its edges and a stripe down the middle. Otherwise, it is covered in brown hairs. There are three white dots on the black eye field between the eyes. The spider's face, or clypeus, has white hairs. The spider has dark brown chelicerae, labium and maxilae. The underside of the carapace, or sternum is also dark brown. The spider's abdomen is between 2.0 and 2.3 mm (0.08 and 0.09 in) long and 2.0 and 2.3 mm (0.08 and 0.09 in) wide. It is russet-brown and covered in brown hairs with a lighter pattern on top and brown underneath. The spinnerets are dark and the legs brown. The spider has a long embolus, with a very fine conductor of nearly the same length. The tibia is small with a apophysis, or appendage, that is short and wide. The female has not been described.

Spiders of the Menemerus genus are difficult to distinguish from each other. It is the copulatory organs of this species that are distinctive and enable it to be identified. The spider's embolus is particularly long and the tibia is small and narrower than the cymbium with a small tibial apophysis.

== Distribution ==
Menemerus spiders are found throughout Africa and Asia, and have been identified as far as Latin America. Menemerus natalis is endemic to South Africa. The holotype was found near Ashburton, KwaZulu-Natal, in 1991. Other examples have been seen in other areas of the country.
