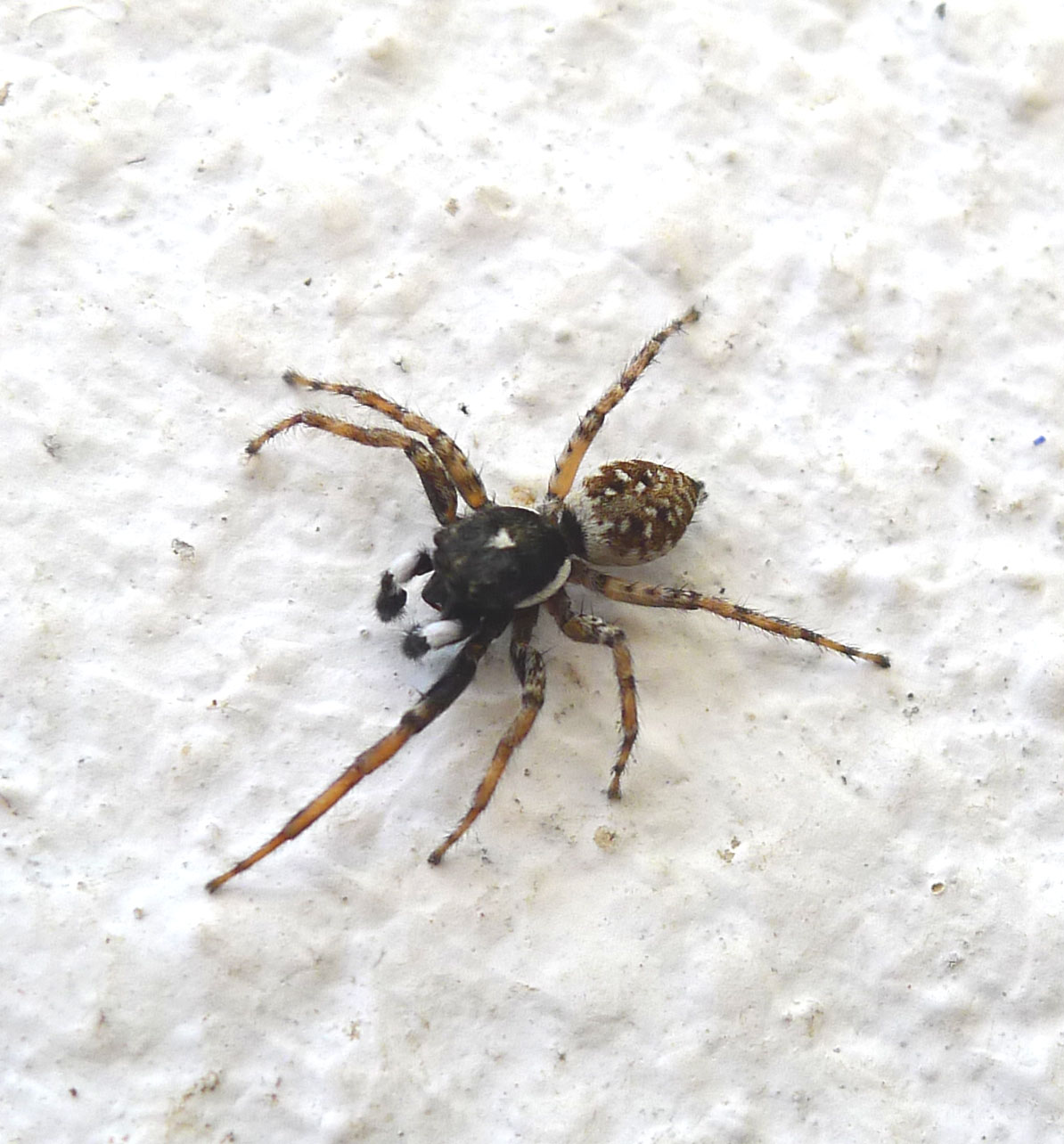
- The related Menemerus semilimbatus

Scientific classification
- Kingdom: Animalia
- Phylum: Arthropoda
- Subphylum: Chelicerata
- Class: Arachnida
- Order: Araneae
- Infraorder: Araneomorphae
- Family: Salticidae
- Genus: Menemerus
- Species: M. pallescens

Binomial name
- Menemerus pallescens Wesołowska & van Harten, 2007

= Menemerus pallescens =

Species of spider

Menemerus pallescens is a species of jumping spider in the genus Menemerus that lives in Yemen. The spider was first described in 2007 by Wanda Wesołowska and Antonius van Harten. Other examples have been found in the Emirate of Dubai. The spider is medium sized with a carapace that is between 2.5 and 3.1 mm (0.10 and 0.12 in) long and abdomen between 3.4 and 4.2 mm (0.13 and 0.17 in) long. The carapace is dark brown with white stripes at the back. The abdomen is yellowish-beige or light grey, sometimes with a pattern of lines and spots. The legs are yellow. The spider is hard to distinguish from others in the genus without a study of its copulatory organs. The spider has a shallow notch at rearmost edge of its epigyne and long accessory glands. The male has not been described.

== Taxonomy ==
Menemerus pallescens is a species of jumping spider that was first described by Wanda Wesołowska and Antonius van Harten in 2010. It is one of over 500 species identified by the Polish arachnologist Wesolowska during her career. They allocated the spider to the genus Menemerus, first circumscribed in 1868 by Eugène Simon and contains over 60 species. The genus name derives from two Greek words, meaning "certainly" and "diurnal".

Phylogenetic analysis has shown that the genus is related to the genera Helvetia and Phintella. The genus also shares some characteristics with the genera Hypaeus and Pellenes. It is a member of the tribe Heliophaninae, renamed Chrysillini by Wayne Maddison in 2015. Chrysillines are monophyletic. The tribe is ubiquitous across most of the continents of the world. It is allocated to the subclade Saltafresia in the clade Salticoida. In 2016, Jerzy Prószyński created a group of genera named Menemerines after the genus. The vast majority of the species in Menemerines are members of the genus, with additional examples from Kima and Leptorchestes. The species is named for the presence of a spike, or apophysis, on the patellar, the section between the tibia and palpal bulb on the spider's copulatory organs.

== Description ==
Menemerus pallescens is a medium-sized spider. Females of this species have a flattened elongated carapace that measures between 2.5 and 3.1 mm (0.10 and 0.12 in) in length and 1.8 and 2.2 mm (0.07 and 0.09 in) in width. It is dark brown with light stripes towards the back and covered in whitish-grey hairs. The spider's face, or clypeus is low and covered in small white hairs. The eye field is black and has a small number of brown bristles. The sternum, the underside of the carapace, is fawn. The mouthparts consist of brown chelicerae, light brown labium and light brown maxilae. The chelicerae has no teeth. The spider has an oval abdomen that is between 3.4 and 4.2 mm (0.13 and 0.17 in) long and 2.3 and 3.5 mm (0.09 and 0.14 in) wide. Some examples are a uniform greyish-yellow. Others are light grey on the top with silver spots of translucent crystals made of guanine and diagonal lines made of brown hairs across the back. It is whitish underneath. The spider's spinnerets are light and the legs are yellow with sparse fawn hairs and brown spines.

Spiders of the Menemerus genus are difficult to distinguish without a study of their copulatory organs. For this species, that is particularly true for the related Menemerus soldani, and especially those found in Tunisia. The pedipalps are light with white hairs. The spider has a medium-sized epigyne that is marked by a shallow notch at rearmost edge. There are two rounded copulatory openings on the sides that lie within in deep, strongly sclerotised entrance cavities and lead to spherical spermathecae. It has long accessory glands, although they are shorter than those in Menemerus soldani. The male has not been described.

== Distribution ==
Menemerus spiders are found throughout Africa and Asia, and have been identified as far as Latin America. Menemerus pallescens is endemic to Yemen. The holotype was found between Al-Goel and Al Hajar in 2000. Other examples have been seen living in Taiz.
