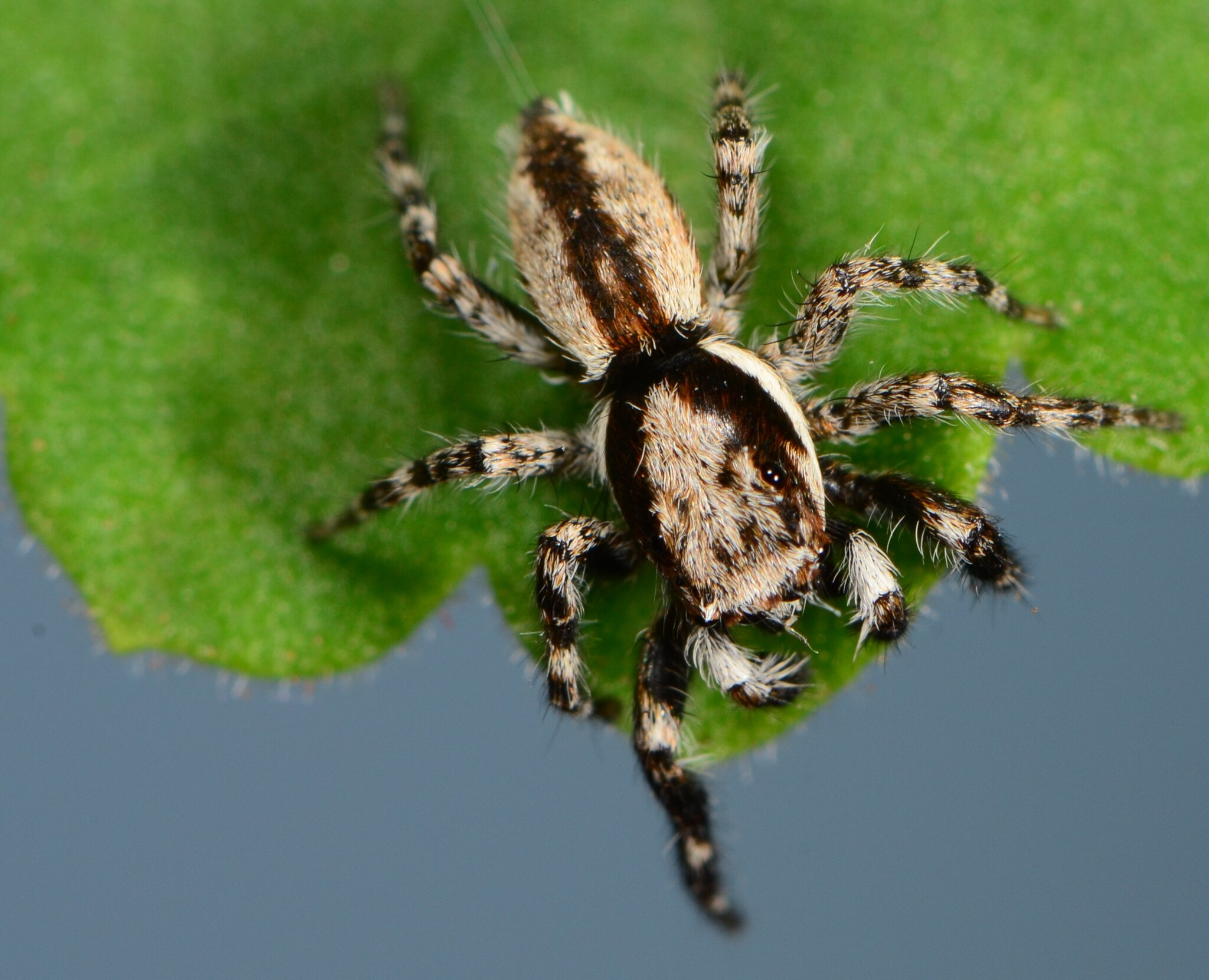
- Male
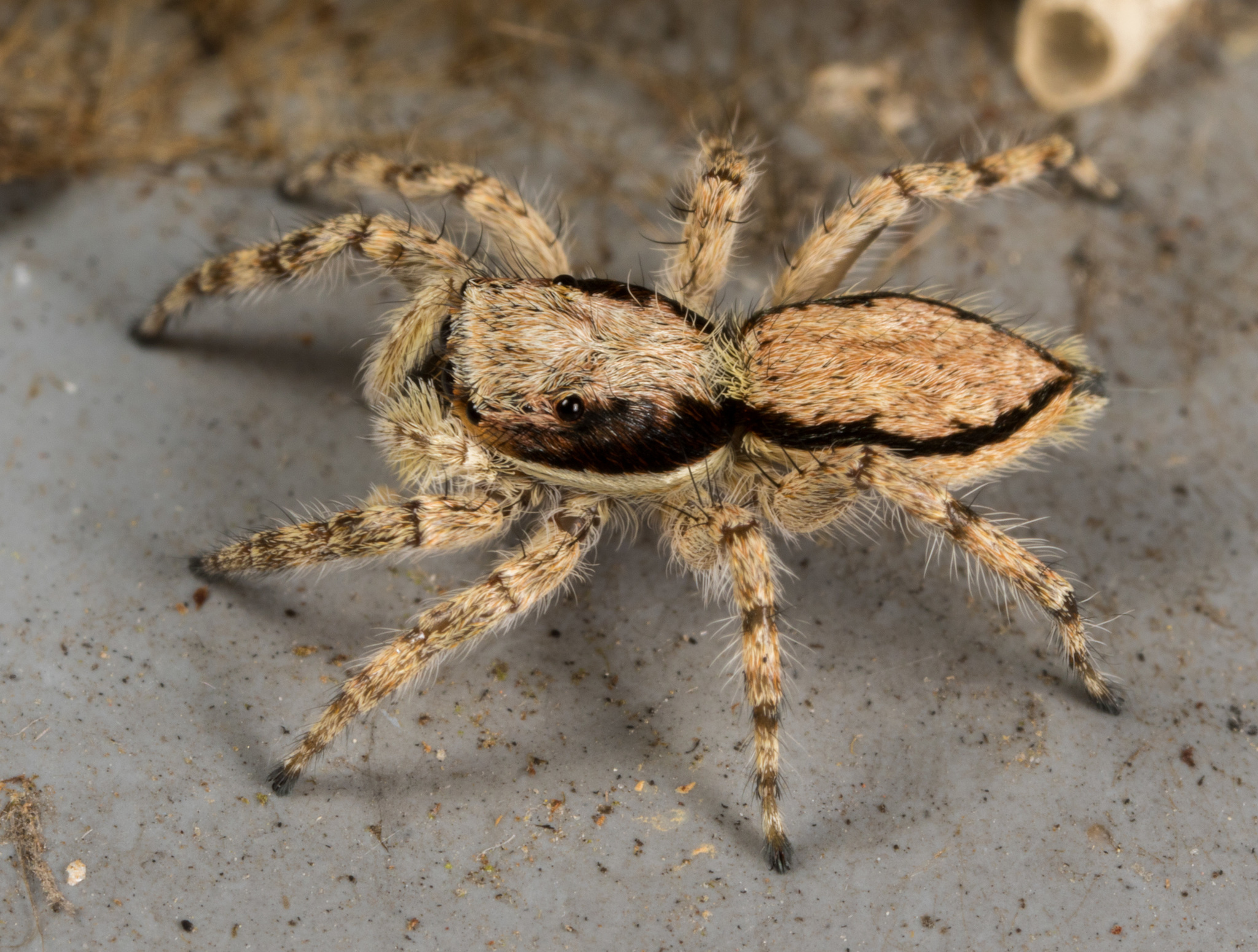
- Female

Scientific classification
- Kingdom: Animalia
- Phylum: Arthropoda
- Subphylum: Chelicerata
- Class: Arachnida
- Order: Araneae
- Infraorder: Araneomorphae
- Family: Salticidae
- Genus: Menemerus
- Species: M. bivittatus

Binomial name
- Menemerus bivittatus (Dufour, 1831)

Synonyms
- List: Attus attentus Walckenaer, 1837; Attus bivittatus (Dufour, 1831); Attus cinctus Walckenaer, 1837; Attus foliatus L. Koch, 1867; Attus locustoides Walckenaer, 1837; Attus mannii Peckham & Peckham, 1883; Attus melanognathus Lucas, 1838; Attus muscivorus Vinson, 1863; Attus planus Taczanowski, 1871; Camponia lineata Badcock, 1932; Dendryphantes balteata (C. L. Koch, 1846); Dendryphantes discoloria (C. L. Koch, 1846); Dendryphantes dissimilis (C. L. Koch, 1846); Dendryphantes incerta (C. L. Koch, 1846); Icius convergens (Doleschall, 1859); Icius dissimilis (C. L. Koch, 1846); Icius maritus (Karsch, 1879); Marpessa nigrolimbata (O. Pickard-Cambridge, 1873); Marpissa balteata C. L. Koch, 1846; Marpissa discoloria C. L. Koch, 1846; Marpissa dissimilis C. L. Koch, 1846; Marpissa incerta C. L. Koch, 1846; Marpissa melanognatha (Lucas, 1838); Marpissa nigrolimbata (O. Pickard-Cambridge, 1873); Marpissa plana (Taczanowski, 1871); Marpissa ridens Hogg, 1914; Marptusa marita Karsch, 1879; Marptusa melanognatha (Lucas, 1838); Menemerus acuminatus Rainbow, 1912; Menemerus bivittatus (Dufour, 1831); Menemerus bonneti Schenkel, 1963; Menemerus foliatus (L. Koch, 1867); Menemerus lineatus (Badcock, 1932); Menemerus melanognathus (Lucas, 1838); Menemerus ridens (Hogg, 1914); Menemerus vittatus Simon, 1877; Salticus bivittatus Dufour, 1831; Salticus convergens Doleschall, 1859; Salticus nigro-limbatus O. Pickard-Cambridge, 1870; Stridulattus stridulans Petrunkevitch, 1926; Tapinattus melanognathus (Lucas, 1838)

= Menemerus bivittatus =

Species of spider

Menemerus bivittatus is a spider in the family Salticidae commonly known as the gray wall jumper. It is a pantropical species and is usually found on the walls of buildings or on tree trunks where it stalks its prey.

== Description ==
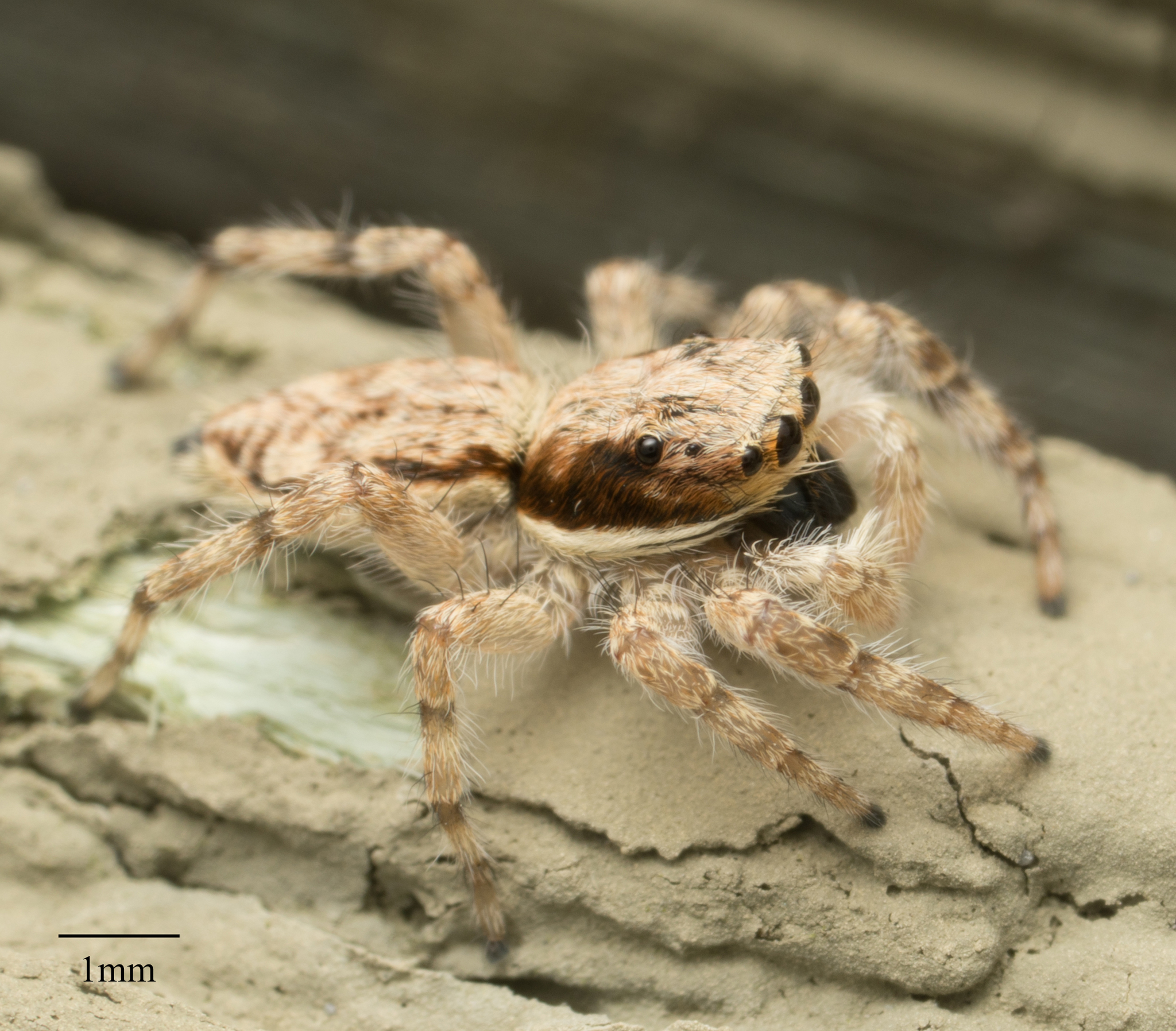
M. bivittatus

Gray wall jumpers are dorso-ventrally flattened and are covered with short dense, grayish-white hairs. There are tufts of dark brown bristles near the large, forward-facing eyes. The spiders are about nine millimetres long, the male being slightly smaller than the female.

The male has a blackish longitudinal dorsal stripe with a brownish-white stripe on either side of the abdomen. The carapace and chelicerae are also black and white and the legs have transverse bandings of the same colours.

The female is generally paler and more brown, with a larger carapace and abdomen. Her carapace is edged with two black bands and a thin white stripe and her abdomen is edged with broad black stripes on each side which unite at the posterior end. Her legs are banded but are paler than those of the male. Immature spiders resemble the female.

== Biology ==
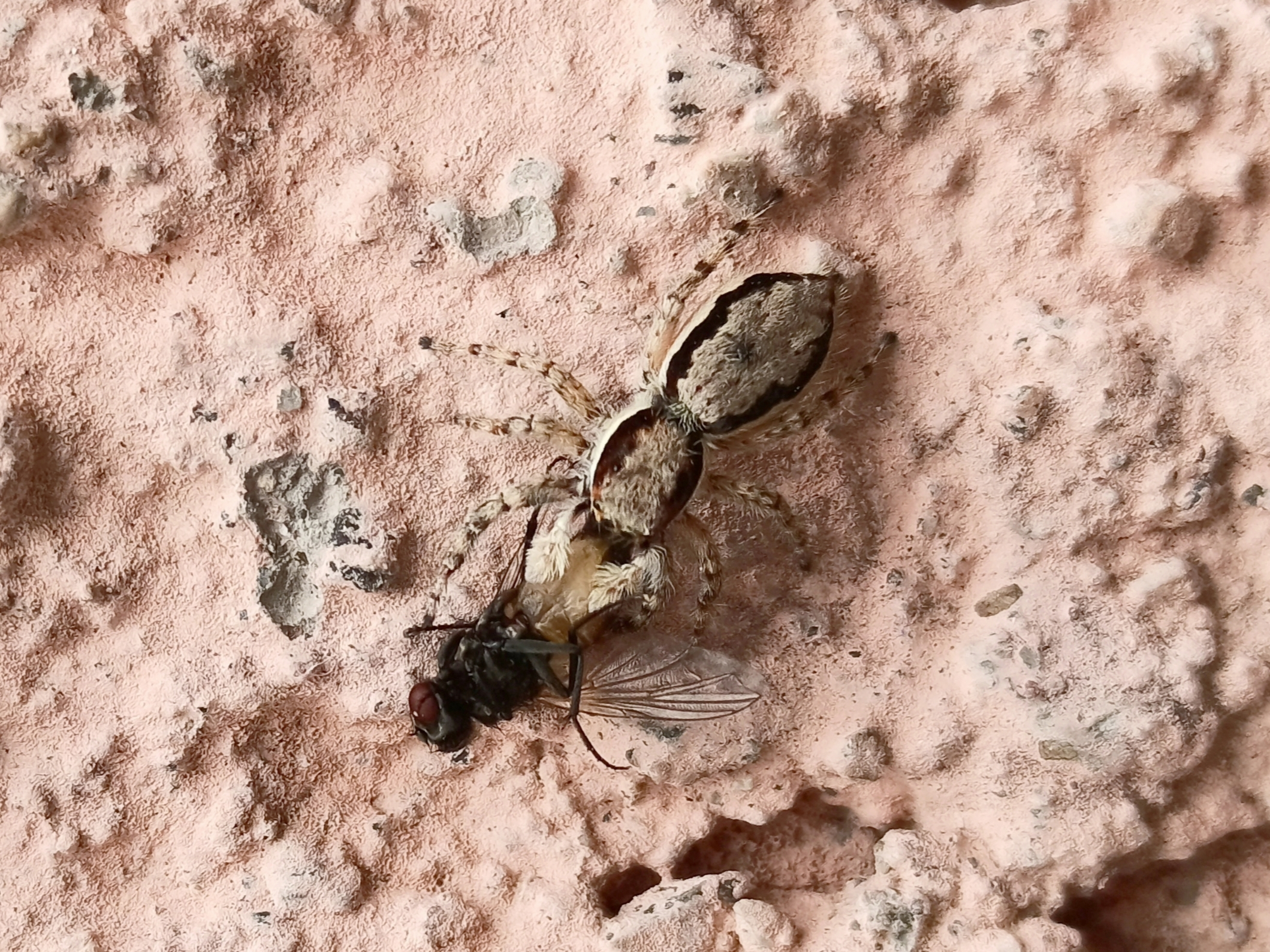
M. bivittatus with its prey

The female gray wall jumper builds an eggsac in a crack or other concealed position in which she lays 25 to 40 eggs in a purse-like silken case. She guards the eggs until they hatch in about three weeks time after which the young spiders disperse.

Both young and old spiders feed mainly on small flies which alight on walls. They do not build a web but instead, stalk their prey before launching an attack by leaping on the victim. They have high visual acuity and their large eyes are able to focus on objects and detect different colours. They use their highly coordinated jumping ability to capture their prey and to move from one place to another. They are capable of capturing insects such as crane flies that are at least twice their own size.

Male spiders of this species possess a stridulatory apparatus which consists of several long bristles on the palpal femur and a series of horizontal ridges on the outer side of the chelicerae. Sound is generated when the spider rubs these ridges up and down against the palpal teeth. This is believed to be part of a courtship display by the male.

In India, this common spider is found on the outer walls of buildings and on tree trunks. It moves actively about in search of small insect prey, often vibrating its hairy palps as it walks. In Gambia, spiders of this species have been observed loitering near and observing the entrances to nests of stingless bees. It is difficult for the spider to catch the bees as they fly out of the entrance but the bees are more vulnerable when returning to the nest.

== Distribution ==
Menemerus bivittatus is native to the Sub-Saharan region in Africa with Nigeria, Kenya, DR Congo, South Africa, Senegal, etc. but has been widely introduced, resulting in a cosmopolitan distribution. In America, the species is found in Florida, Texas, and California (USA) and south as far as Paraguay, including some Caribbean islands, Colombia, and Venezuela. It is often seen on the outside of man-made structures.

== Gallery ==
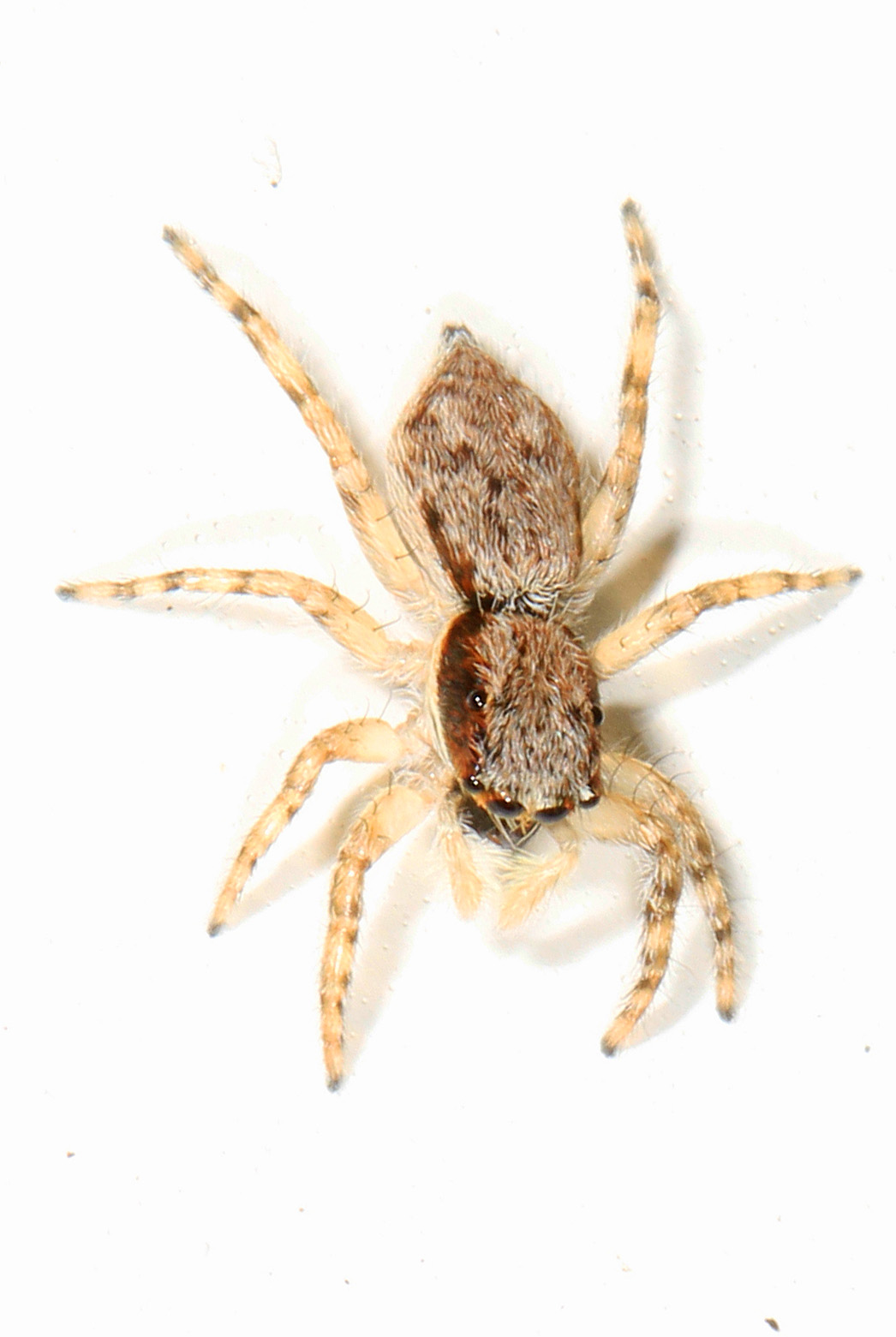
General view

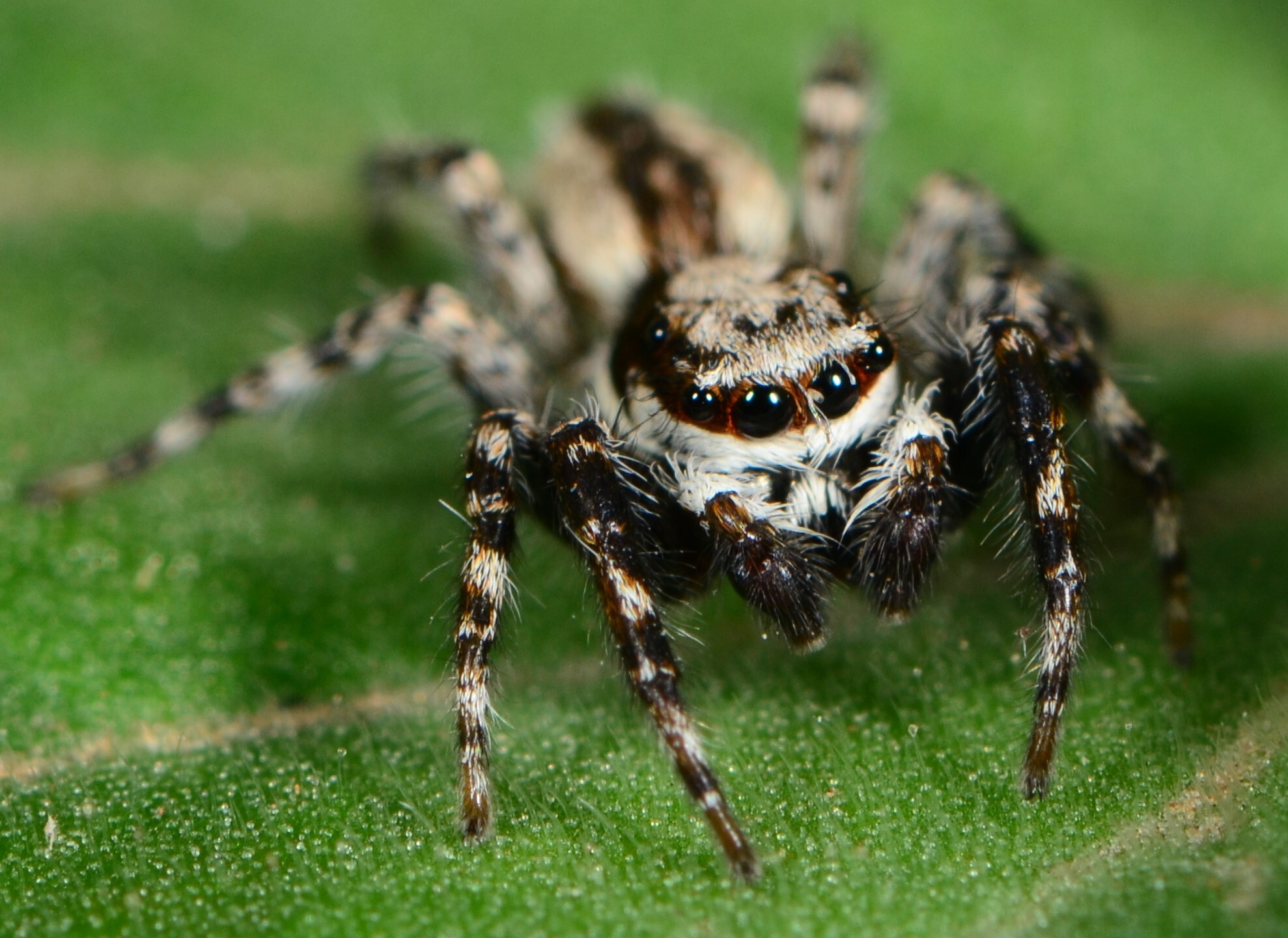
Male

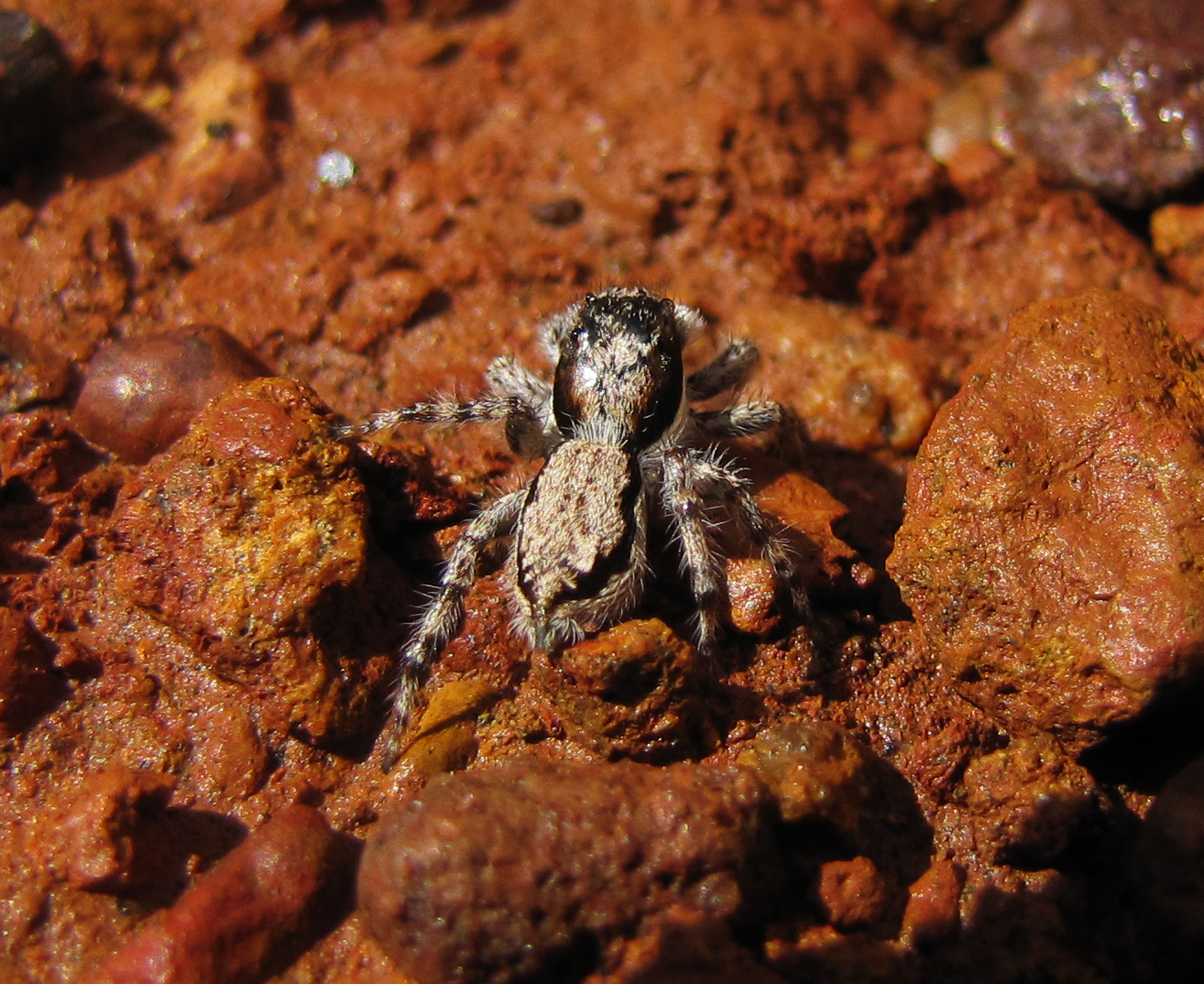
Female

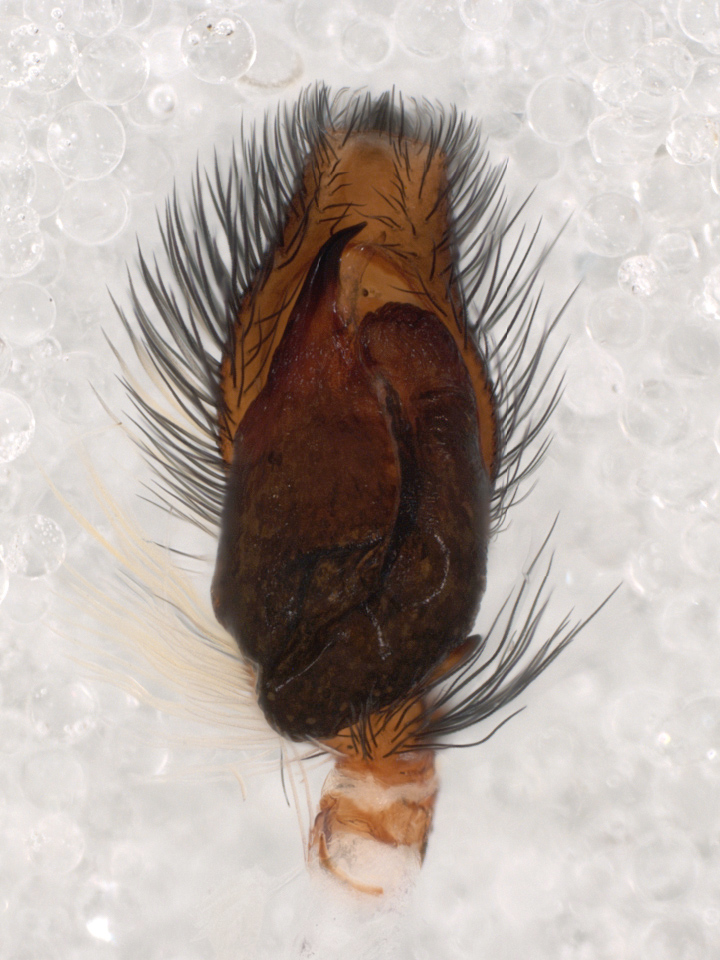
Male pedipalp
