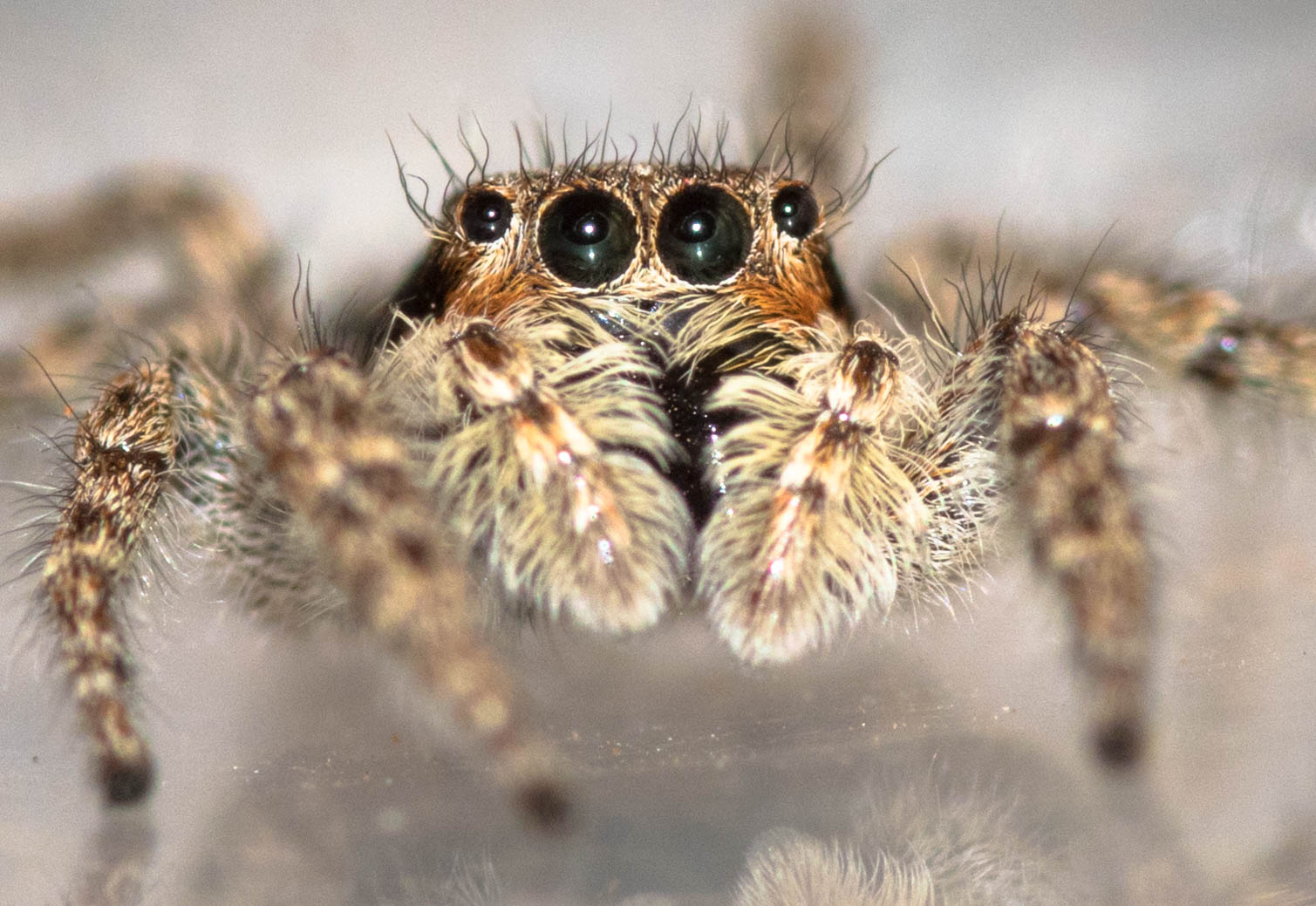
- A spider of the Menemerus genus

Scientific classification
- Kingdom: Animalia
- Phylum: Arthropoda
- Subphylum: Chelicerata
- Class: Arachnida
- Order: Araneae
- Infraorder: Araneomorphae
- Family: Salticidae
- Genus: Menemerus
- Species: M. desertus

Binomial name
- Menemerus desertus Wesołowska, 1999

= Menemerus desertus =

Species of spider

Menemerus desertus is a species of jumping spider in the genus Menemerus that lives in Algeria. The species was first described in 1999 by Wanda Wesołowska, one of over 500 descriptions she produced during her lifetime. The spider is small, with a carapace that ranges between 2.5 and 2.7 millimetres (0.098 and 0.106 in) long and an abdomen that is 2.7 and 4.7 millimetres (0.11 and 0.19 in) long, although the female is larger than the male. The carapace is generally a uniform dark brown while the abdomen has a yellow stripe. Otherwise, it is its copulatory organs that most distinguish the species from others in the genus. The female epigyne has ridges at the entrance to the insemination ducts. The male has a distinctive dorsal tibial apophysis.

== Taxonomy ==
Menemerus desertus is a species of jumping spider that was first described by Wanda Wesołowska in 1999. It was one of over 500 species identified by the Polish arachnologist during her career, making her one of the most prolific in the field. She allocated the spider to the genus Menemerus. The genus was first described in 1868 by Eugène Simon and contains over 60 species. The genus name derives from two Greek words, meaning certainly and diurnal.

Genetic analysis has shown that Menemerus is related to the genera Helvetia and Phintella. The genus shares some characteristics with the genera Hypaeus and Pellenes. It was previously placed in the tribe Heliophaninae until the tribe was reconstituted as Chrysillini by Wayne Maddison in 2015. The tribe is ubiquitous across most continents of the world. It is allocated to the subclade Saltafresia in the clade Salticoida. In 2016, Prószyński created a group of genera named Menemerines after the genus. The vast majority of the species in Menemerines are members of the genus, with additional examples from Kima and Leptorchestes. The species name is derived from the desert landscape in which the spider lives.

== Description ==
Menemerus desertus is a small spider. The male has a dark brown carapace that is typically 2.5 millimetres (0.098 in) long and is completely covered in short brown hairs. There are long bristles around the nearly black eye field. The spider has brown chelicerae, an orange labium, orange maxilae, yellow sternum and light spinnerets. The spider's light brown abdomen is typically 2.7 mm (0.11 in) long. It has a wide yellow stripe down the middle and is covered in dense brown and light hairs. The underside is yellowish. It has yellow-orange legs that are covered in brown and white hairs and have brown spines. The spider's copulatory organs are distinctive. The pedipalps are brown and have a thin embolus and large dorsal tibial apophysis or spike that features lobes on its exterior.

Larger than the male, the female is otherwise generally similar. The carapace is typically 2.7 mm (0.11 in) in length while the abdomen is considerably longer, measuring typically 4.7 mm (0.19 in) in length. The epigyne is large oval and has a very shallow depression and a wide pocket. There are ridges at the edges of the entrance bowls to the copulatory openings. Positioned to the sides in the middle, these are very heavily sclerotized, and lead to insemination ducts that loop before leading to relatively small spermathecae. The accessory glands are long.

Spiders of the Menemerus genus are difficult to distinguish from each other. It is the copulatory organs of this species that are distinctive and enable it to be identified. The male has a very large dorsal tibial apophysis and a very different design of embolus to others. The female has characteristic ridges on its epigyne.

== Distribution ==
Menemerus desertus is endemic to Algeria. The holotype and other examples were found near Aïn Séfra. It is only known from that area of the country.
