= Menemerus nigeriensis =

Scientific classification
- Kingdom: Animalia
- Phylum: Arthropoda
- Subphylum: Chelicerata
- Class: Arachnida
- Order: Araneae
- Infraorder: Araneomorphae
- Family: Salticidae
- Genus: Menemerus
- Species: M. nigeriensis

Binomial name
- Menemerus nigeriensis Wesołowska & Russell-Smith, 2011

Species of spider

Menemerus nigeriensis is a species of jumping spider in the genus Menemerus that lives in Nigeria. The species was first described in 2011 by Wanda Wesołowska and Anthony Russell-Smith based on a holotype found near Ibadan. The spider is medium-sized, with a cephalothorax that is typically 2.5 millimetres (0.10 in) long and an abdomen 2.6 millimetres (0.10 in) long. The carapace is generally a uniform dark brown, the eye field black and the abdomen greyish-brown. As with other Menemerus spiders, it is its copulatory organs that most distinguish the species from others in the genus. The male has a distinctive dorsal tibia that has a very long and pointed apophysis or appendage. The female has not been identified.

== Taxonomy ==
Menemerus nigeriensis is a species of jumping spider that was first described by Wanda Wesołowska and Anthony Russell-Smith in 2011. It was one of over 500 species that the Polish arachnologist Wesołowska had helped identify during her career, ensuring her reputation as one of the most prolific in the field. They allocated the spider to the genus Menemerus, first circumscribed in 1868 by Eugène Simon. It contains over 60 species. The genus name derives from two Greek words, meaning certainly and diurnal.

Genetic analysis has shown that Menemerus is related to the genera Helvetia and Phintella. The genus shares some characteristics with the genera Hypaeus and Pellenes. Previously placed in the tribe Heliophaninae, the tribe was reconstituted as Chrysillini by Wayne Maddison in 2015. The tribe is ubiquitous across most continents of the world. It is allocated to the subclade Saltafresia in the clade Salticoida. In 2016, Jerzy Prószyński created a group of genera named Menemerines after the genus. The vast majority of the species in Menemerines are members of the genus, with additional examples from Kima and Leptorchestes. The species name is derived from the nme of the country where it was first found.

== Description ==
Menemerus nigeriensis is a medium-sized spider. The male has a cephalothorax that is typically 2.5 millimetres (0.098 in) long and 1.9 millimetres (0.075 in). It has a flat oval dark brown carapace with a black eye field that has a metallic sheen and brown bristles near the eyes. The spider's face or clypeus is very low with a covering of white hairs. The spider has brown mouthparts, including its labium. The sternum, or underside of the cephalothorax, is also brown. The spider's abdomen is typically 2.6 mm (0.10 in) long and 1.6 millimetres (0.06 in) wide. It is a greyish-brown ovoid, covered in delicate colourless hairs. The underside is dark. It has grey spinnerets and brown legs. The pedipalps are also brown, with some white hairs visible on the femur. There are bristles on the femur that the spider uses for stridulation with a ridges on its chelicerae. The palpal bulb is short and wide with a small embolus with an opposing conductor of a similar size and a thin and very long tibial apophysis, or appendage on the palpal tibia. The female has not been described.

Spiders of the Menemerus genus are difficult to distinguish from each other. It is necessary to study the copulatory organs to identify the different species. The shape of the tibial apophysis is distinctive, as it is longer and more pointed than in other spiders.

== Behaviour ==
Due to their good eyesight, Menemerus spiders are mostly diurnal hunters. They attack using a complex approach to their prey and are generally more proactive in their attacks in comparison to web-spinning spiders. They will eat a wide range of prey and is likely to eat nectar. The males undertake aggressive displays between themselves.

== Distribution ==
Menemerus spiders are found throughout Africa and Asia, and have been identified as far as Latin America. Menemerus nigeriensis is endemic to Nigeria. The holotype was found in 1974 near Ibadan.
