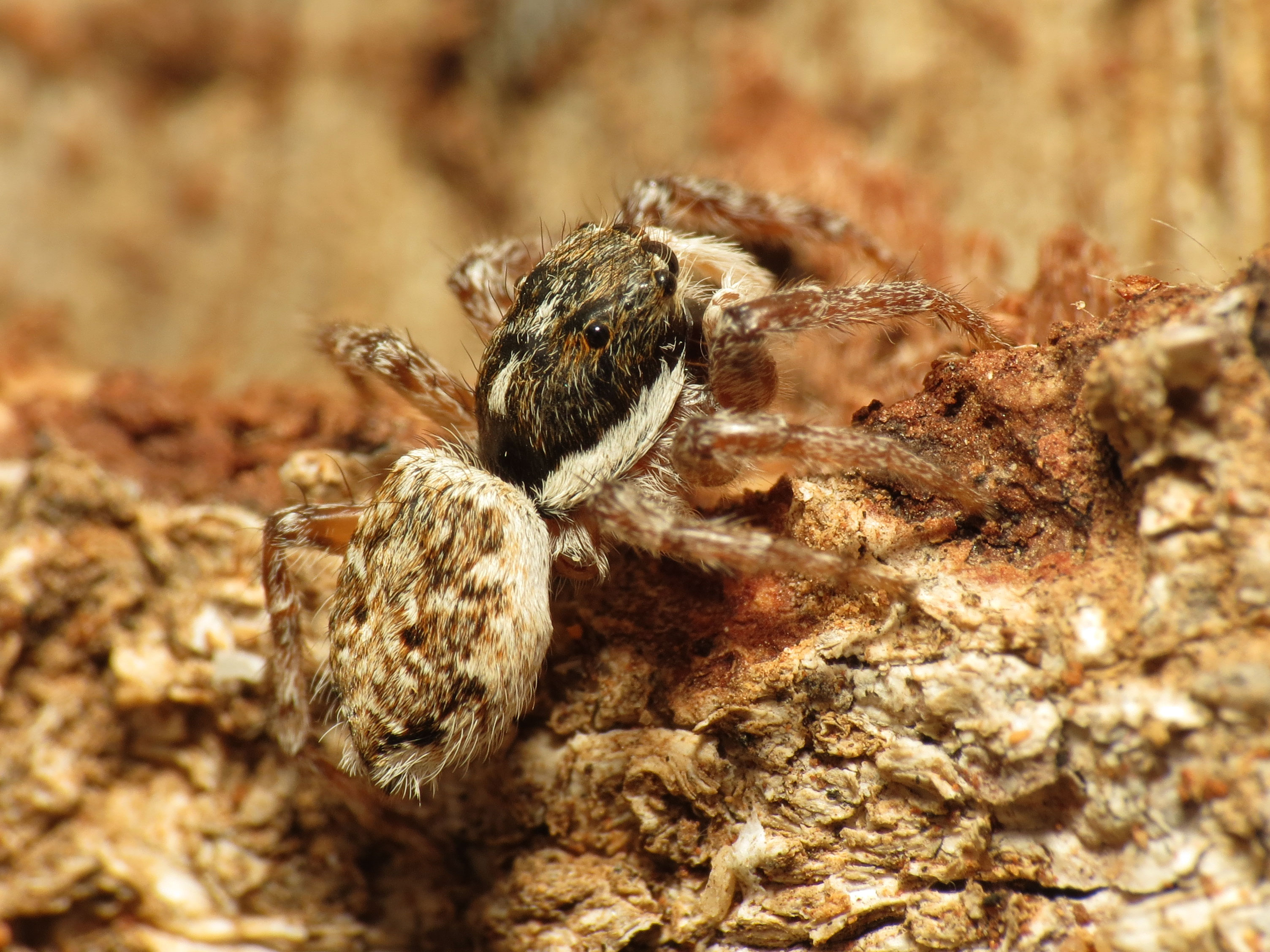
- The related Menemerus semilimbatus'

Scientific classification
- Kingdom: Animalia
- Phylum: Arthropoda
- Subphylum: Chelicerata
- Class: Arachnida
- Order: Araneae
- Infraorder: Araneomorphae
- Family: Salticidae
- Genus: Menemerus
- Species: M. utilis

Binomial name
- Menemerus utilis Wesołowska, 1999

= Menemerus utilis =

Species of spider

Menemerus utilis is a species of jumping spider in the genus Menemerus that lives in Tunisia. The species was first identified in 1999 by Wanda Wesołowska, one of over 500 descriptions she produced during her lifetime. The spider is mainly a diurnal hunter. It is small, with a brown carapace that is between 2.9 and 3.3 mm (0.11 and 0.13 in) long and a yellowish abdomen is between 4.8 and 6.5 mm (0.19 and 0.26 in) long. The female has a distinctive epigyne that lacks the pocket common in other species. Instead, it has a large and deep central depression. The copulatory openings are also unusual and the short insemination ducts and position of the spermathecae at the edge of the rear of the epigyne are also characteristic of the species. The male has not been described.

== Taxonomy ==
Menemerus utilis is a species of jumping spider that was first described by Wanda Wesołowska in 1999. It was one of over 500 species identified by the Polish arachnologist during her career, making her one of the most prolific scientists in the field. She allocated the spider to the genus Menemerus. The genus was first described in 1868 by Eugène Simon and contains over 60 species. The genus name derives from two Greek words, meaning certainly and diurnal. The genus shares some characteristics with the genera Hypaeus and Pellenes.

Genetic analysis has shown that the genus is related to the genera Helvetia and Phintella. Previously placed in the tribe Heliophaninae, the tribe was reconstituted as Chrysillini by Wayne Maddison in 2015. The tribe is ubiquitous across most continents of the world. it is allocated to the subclade Saltafresia in the clade Salticoida. In 2016, Prószyński created a group of genera named Menemerines after the genus. The vast majority of the species in Menemerines are members of the genus, with additional examples from Kima and Leptorchestes. The species name derives from the Latin for useful or beneficial, utilis.

== Description ==
Menemerus utilis is a medium-sized spider. The female has a brown carapace that is between 2.9 and 3.3 mm (0.11 and 0.13 in) long and is covered by light grey hairs, interspersed with occasional brown bristles. The eye field is black. The spider has a low clypeus that has white hairs. The chelicerae, labium and maxilae are brown. The sternum is yellow. The spider's yellowish abdomen is between 4.8 and 6.5 mm (0.19 and 0.26 in) long. It has brown hairs on the top and a pattern that looks somewhat like a leaf, although faint. There are long brown bristles on the side and the underside is light. It has yellowish spinnerets and light brown legs, the latter covered in brown hairs with brown spines. The spider's copulatory organs are distinctive. The epigyne is large and heavily sclerotized. There is a very large and deep central depression and a notch in the middle of the very edge at the rear. The copulatory openings lead to short insemination ducts and spermathecae placed to the edge of the rear of the epigyne. The male has not been described.

Spiders of the Menemerus genus are difficult to distinguish. The species can be identified by its copulatory organs, particularly the structure of the epigyne. It is unusual in not having an epigynal pocket, but instead a large hollow in the centre of the epigyne. The way that the copulatory openings lead from the inside to short insemination ducts is also characteristic of the species, as is the position of the spermathecae.

== Behaviour ==
Due to their good eyesight, Menemerus spiders are mostly diurnal hunters. They attack using a complex approach to their prey and are generally more proactive in comparison to web-spinning spiders. They undertake complex courtship displays while the males will display aggressively between themselves. The spider is likely to eat nectar.

== Distribution ==
Menemerus spiders are found throughout Africa and Asia, and have been identified as far as Latin America. Menemerus utilis is endemic to Tunisia.
