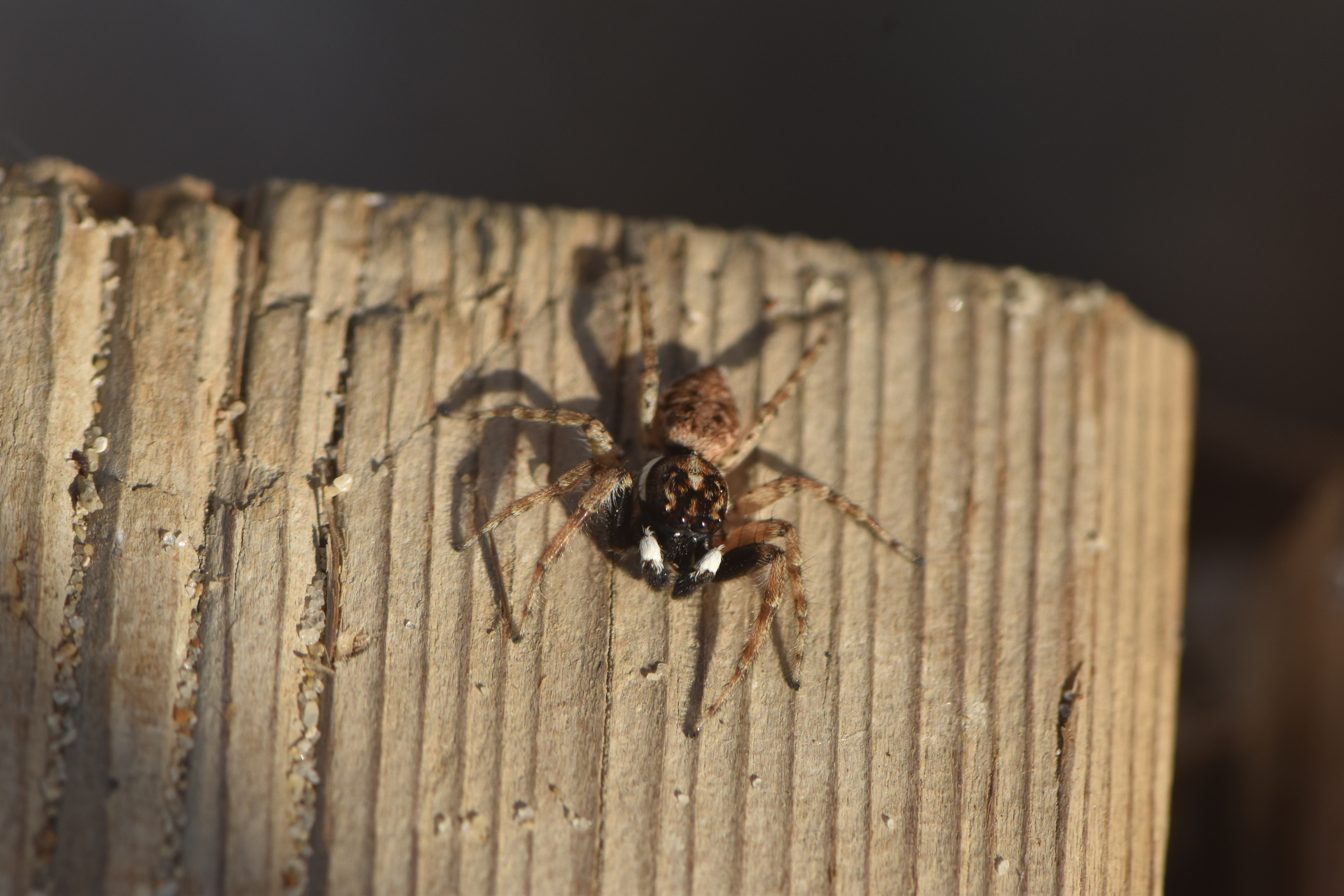
- The related Menemerus semilimbatus

Scientific classification
- Kingdom: Animalia
- Phylum: Arthropoda
- Subphylum: Chelicerata
- Class: Arachnida
- Order: Araneae
- Infraorder: Araneomorphae
- Family: Salticidae
- Genus: Menemerus
- Species: M. namibicus

Binomial name
- Menemerus namibicus Wesołowska, 1999

= Menemerus namibicus =

Species of spider

Menemerus namibicus is a species of jumping spider in the genus Menemerus that lives in Namibia. The species was first described in 1999 by Wanda Wesołowska. It is small to medium-sized spider with a dark brown carapace that is between 2.7 and 3.3 millimetres (0.11 and 0.13 in) long and a black abdomen between 3.7 and 4.9 millimetres (0.15 and 0.19 in) long. The spider's eye field is also black while the carapace is covered in grey hairs. The spider can be distinguished from others in the genus by its copulatory organs. The female epigyne has a large depression and strongly sclerotized entrance bowls, short insemination ducts and spherical spermathecae. The ridges at the very rear of the depression is characteristic of the species. The male has not been described.

== Taxonomy ==
Menemerus namibicus is a species of jumping spider that was first described by the Polish arachnologist Wanda Wesołowska in 1999. It is one of over 500 species identified by during her career, making her one of the most prolific in the field. She allocated the spider to the genus Menemerus. The genus was first circumscribed in 1868 by Eugène Simon and contains over 60 species. The genus name derives from two Greek words, meaning certainly and diurnal. The genus shares some characteristics with the genera Hypaeus and Pellenes.

Genetic analysis has shown that the genus is related to the genera Helvetia and Phintella. It was placed in the tribe Heliophaninae, which was reconstituted Chrysillini by Wayne Maddison in 2015. The tribe is ubiquitous across most of the continents of the world. It is allocated to the subclade Saltafresia in the clade Salticoida. In 2016, Jerzy Prószyński created a group of genera named Menemerines after the genus. The vast majority of the species in Menemerines are members of the genus, with additional examples from Kima and Leptorchestes. The species is named for Namibia, the country where it was first found.

== Description ==
Menemerus namibicus is a small to medium-sized spider. The female has a dark brown carapace, covered in light grey hairs, that is between 2.7 and 3.1 millimetres (0.11 and 0.12 in) long and 2.0 and 2.3 millimetres (0.08 and 0.09 in) wide, with narrow white stripes formed of hairs on its edges. The eye field is black, with long brown bristles near its eyes. The spider has a low brown clypeus, or face, that also has a scattering of white hairs. It has brown mouthparts, including its chelicerae, labium and maxilae. The underside of its carapace, or sternum, is also brown. The abdomen is between 3.7 and 4.9 millimetres (0.15 and 0.19 in) in length and between 2.2 and 2.8 millimetres (0.09 and 0.11 in) in width. It is black on top and grey underneath. The spider has dark spinnerets and brown legs. The epigyne has a large depression and strongly sclerotized entrance bowls that lead to short insemination ducts and spherical spermathecae. The rims of the bowls appear as a straight line. The male has not been described.

Spiders of the Menemerus genus are difficult to distinguish. Menemerus namibicus is most similar to Menemerus carlini. The copulatory organs help to identify the species, particularly the straight edges to the rearmost edge of the depression on the epigyne.

== Distribution and habitat ==
Menemerus spiders are found throughout Africa and Asia, and have been identified as far as Latin America. Menemerus namibicus is endemic to Namibia. The female holotype was found in 1986, although an earlier example found in 1985 was also identified as the same species. The spider has been found on the ground and in a mud dauber nest found in a farm building.
