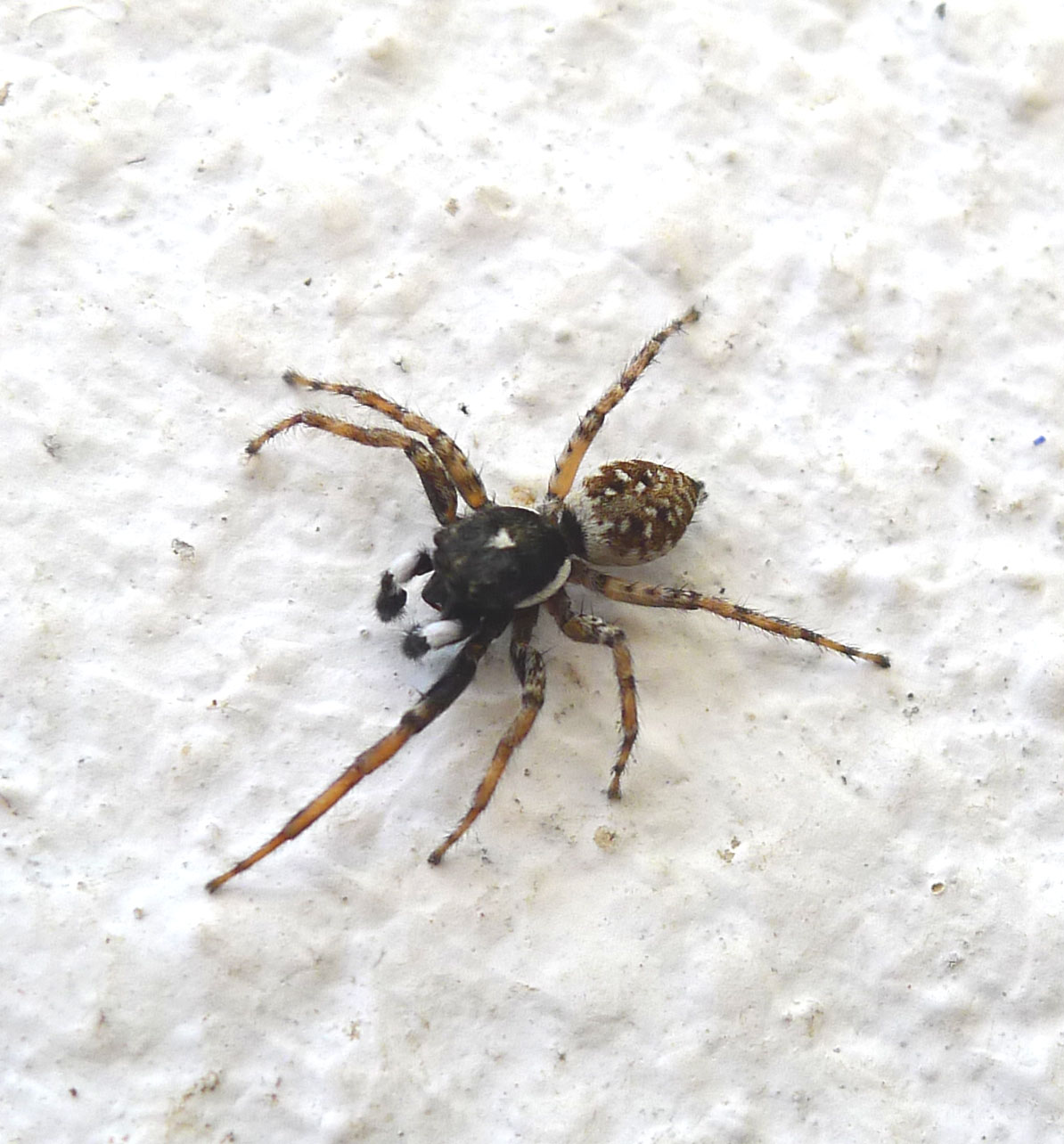
- The related Menemerus semilimbatus

Scientific classification
- Kingdom: Animalia
- Phylum: Arthropoda
- Subphylum: Chelicerata
- Class: Arachnida
- Order: Araneae
- Infraorder: Araneomorphae
- Family: Salticidae
- Genus: Menemerus
- Species: M. niangbo

Binomial name
- Menemerus niangbo Wesołowska & Russell-Smith, 2022

= Menemerus niangbo =

Species of spider

Menemerus niangbo is a species of jumping spider in the genus Menemerus that lives in Ivory Coast. The spider was first described in 2007 by Wanda Wesołowska and Anthony Russell-Smith. It lives in montane grasslands and shrublands.The spider is medium sized with a cephalothorax that is typically 2.6 mm (0.10 in) long and an abdomen 2.9 mm (0.11 in) long. The pear-shaped carapace is brown with a black eye field. The abdomen is dark grey with a pattern of lighter patches on top and yellowish underneath. The legs are yellowish. The spider is hard to distinguish from others in the genus without a study of its copulatory organs. Only the female has been identified. It has two distinctive pockets in the fold at the back of epigyne that is visible externally and an internal structure that includes long accessory glands and bean-shaped spermathecae.

== Taxonomy ==
Menemerus niangbo is a species of jumping spider that was first described by Wanda Wesołowska and Anthony Russell-Smith in 2022. It is one of over 500 species identified by the Polish arachnologist Wesolowska during her career. It is named for the mountain where the first example was found. They allocated the spider to Menemerus, first circumscribed in 1868 by Eugène Simon.

The genus Menemerus contains over 60 species of spider. Its name derives from two Greek words, meaning "certainly" and "diurnal". Phylogenetic analysis has shown that the genus is related to the genera Helvetia and Phintella. The genus also shares some characteristics with the genera Hypaeus and Pellenes. It is a member of the tribe Heliophaninae, renamed Chrysillini by Wayne Maddison in 2015. Chrysillines are monophyletic. The tribe is ubiquitous across most of the continents of the world. It is allocated to the subclade Saltafresia in the clade Salticoida. In 2016, Jerzy Prószyński created a group of genera named Menemerines after the genus. The vast majority of the species in Menemerines are members of the genus group, with additional examples from Kima and Leptorchestes.

== Description ==
Menemerus niangbo is a medium-sized spider with unique physical features. The spider's body is divided into two main parts: the cephalothorax, which measures typically 2.6 mm (0.10 in) long and 1.7 mm (0.07 in) wide, and the abdomen, which measures 2.9 mm (0.11 in) long and 2.2 mm (0.09 in) wide. Females of this species have a pear-shaped flattened carapace, the hard upper part of the cephalothorax, that is brown with covered in dense brown hair. There is a black line on the sides. The eye field is black with some light bristles visible near the eyes. The underside, or sternum, is brown, as is the spider's face or clypeus. The mouthparts, the chelicerae, labium and maxilae. are also brown but there are white fringes to the labium and maxilae. In contrast to the carapace, the abdomen is dark grey on top with a pattern of lighter spots that is mirrored left to right. The patches are less distinct and darker in the middle. It is covered in dense brown hairs. The underside is yellowish with a broad grey stripe running across the middle. The spider's spinnerets are grey while the legs are brownish-grey with rings that are lighter and brown hairs. The male has not been described.

Spiders of the Menemerus genus are difficult to distinguish without a study of the copulatory organs. The spider's epigyne is particularly characteristic. It has a large entrances which are framed by bowl-like structures, which is similar to Menemerus carlini, but can be distinguished by the existence of twin pockets in the epigastric fold, which is found at the back of epigyne separating it from the rest abdomen. Internally, the copulatory openings lead to relatively narrow and looped insemination ducts that are connected to long accessory glands and bean-shaped spermathecae.

== Distribution and habitat ==
Menemerus spiders are found throughout Africa and Asia, and have been identified as far as Latin America. Menemerus niangbo is endemic to Ivory Coast. The holotype was found on Mount Niangbo in 1975. It is recorded by Jean-Claude Ledoux as being found at the summit of the mountain in alpine grass. The species thrives in montane grasslands and shrublands.
