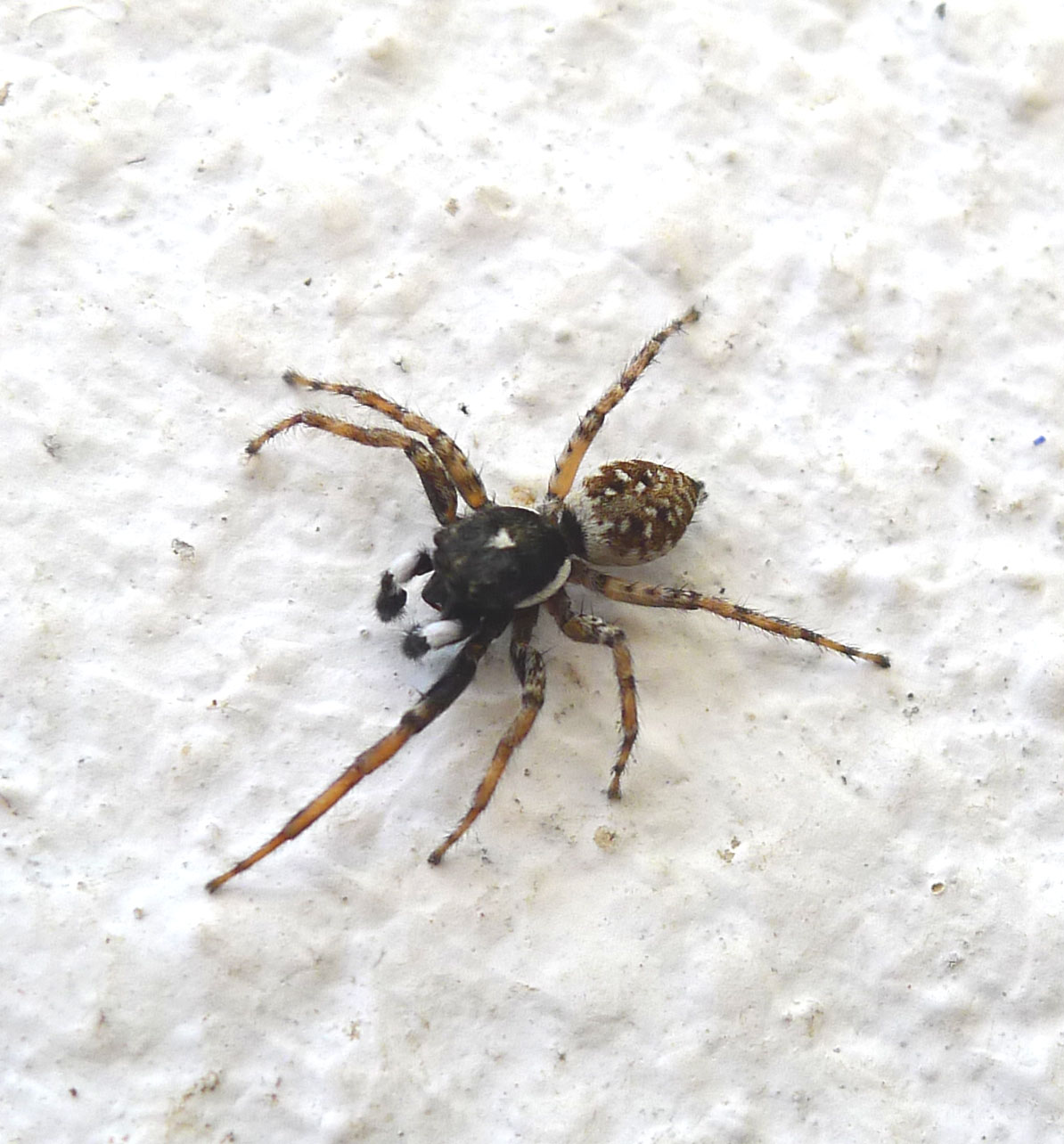
- The related Menemerus semilimbatus

Scientific classification
- Kingdom: Animalia
- Phylum: Arthropoda
- Subphylum: Chelicerata
- Class: Arachnida
- Order: Araneae
- Infraorder: Araneomorphae
- Family: Salticidae
- Genus: Menemerus
- Species: M. patellaris

Binomial name
- Menemerus patellaris Wesołowska & van Harten, 2007

= Menemerus patellaris =

Species of spider

Menemerus patellaris is a species of jumping spider in the genus Menemerus that lives in Yemen. The spider was first described in 2007 by Wanda Wesołowska and Antonius van Harten. The spider is medium-sized with a carapace that is typically 2.6 mm (0.10 in) long and abdomen between 2.9 mm (0.11 in) long. The carapace is brown with white stripes on the edges. The abdomen is yellowish-beige, while the legs are yellow. The spider is hard to distinguish from others in the genus without a study of its copulatory organs. It has a very short embolus and a distinctive furrow in its tegulum dividing a sac of tissue used in copulation called the haematodocha. In addition to the spike, or apophysis on its tibia, it has another one on the patella.

== Taxonomy ==
Menemerus patellaris is a species of jumping spider that was first described by Wanda Wesołowska and Antonius van Harten in 2010. It is one of over 500 species identified by the Polish arachnologist Wesolowska during her career. They allocated the spider to the genus Menemerus, first circumscribed in 1868 by Eugène Simon, containing over 60 species. The genus name derives from two Greek words, meaning "certainly" and "diurnal".

Phylogenetic analysis has shown that the genus is related to the genera Helvetia and Phintella. The genus also shares some characteristics with the genera Hypaeus and Pellenes. It is a member of the tribe Heliophaninae, renamed Chrysillini by Wayne Maddison in 2015. Chrysillines are monophyletic. The tribe is ubiquitous across most of the continents of the world. It is allocated to the subclade Saltafresia in the clade Salticoida. In 2016, Jerzy Prószyński created a group of genera named Menemerines after the genus. The vast majority of the species in Menemerines are members of the genus, with additional examples from Kima and Leptorchestes. The species is named for the presence of a spike, or apophysis, on the patellar, the section between the tibia and palpal bulb on the spider's copulatory organs.

== Description ==
Menemerus patellaris males have a flattened carapace typically 2.6 mm (0.10 in) long and 1.9 mm (0.07 in) wide. It has wide brown stripes along the sides formed of white hairs extending onto the spider's face, or clypeus. The eye field is darker. The remainder has a covering of greyish-white hairs. The mouthpart, the chelicerae, labium and maxilae, are brown, with pale tips on the maxillae. The sternum, the underside of the cephalothorax, is light brown. The abdomen is yellowish-beige on the top and yellow underneath. It is typically 2.9 mm (0.11 in) long and 1.7 mm (0.07 in) wide, with a covering of long brown and yellowish hairs. The spider's spinnerets are yellow. Its legs are also yellow, the foremost being light brown with a dark brown stripe on the front. The legs have long brown spines and yellow hairs. The pedipalps are light brown with dense white hairs on the femur and patella.

Spiders of the Menemerus genus are difficult to distinguish. A study of the copulatory organs is essential to determining the species. Menemerus patellaris has a cymbium with a scattering of white hairs. The spider's tegulum is a narrow oval with a distinctive furrow dividing a sac of tissue used in copulation called a haematodocha. The embolus is very short. The tibia of its pedipalp has a single apophysis. There is a large lump at the base of the palpal femur. It can be differentiated from other species in the genus by the presence of an apophysis on the patellar. The female has not been described.

== Distribution and habitat ==
Menemerus spiders are found throughout Africa and Asia, and have been identified as far as Latin America. Menemerus patellaris is endemic to Yemen. The holotype was found in Taiz in 1998. It was living in a house.
