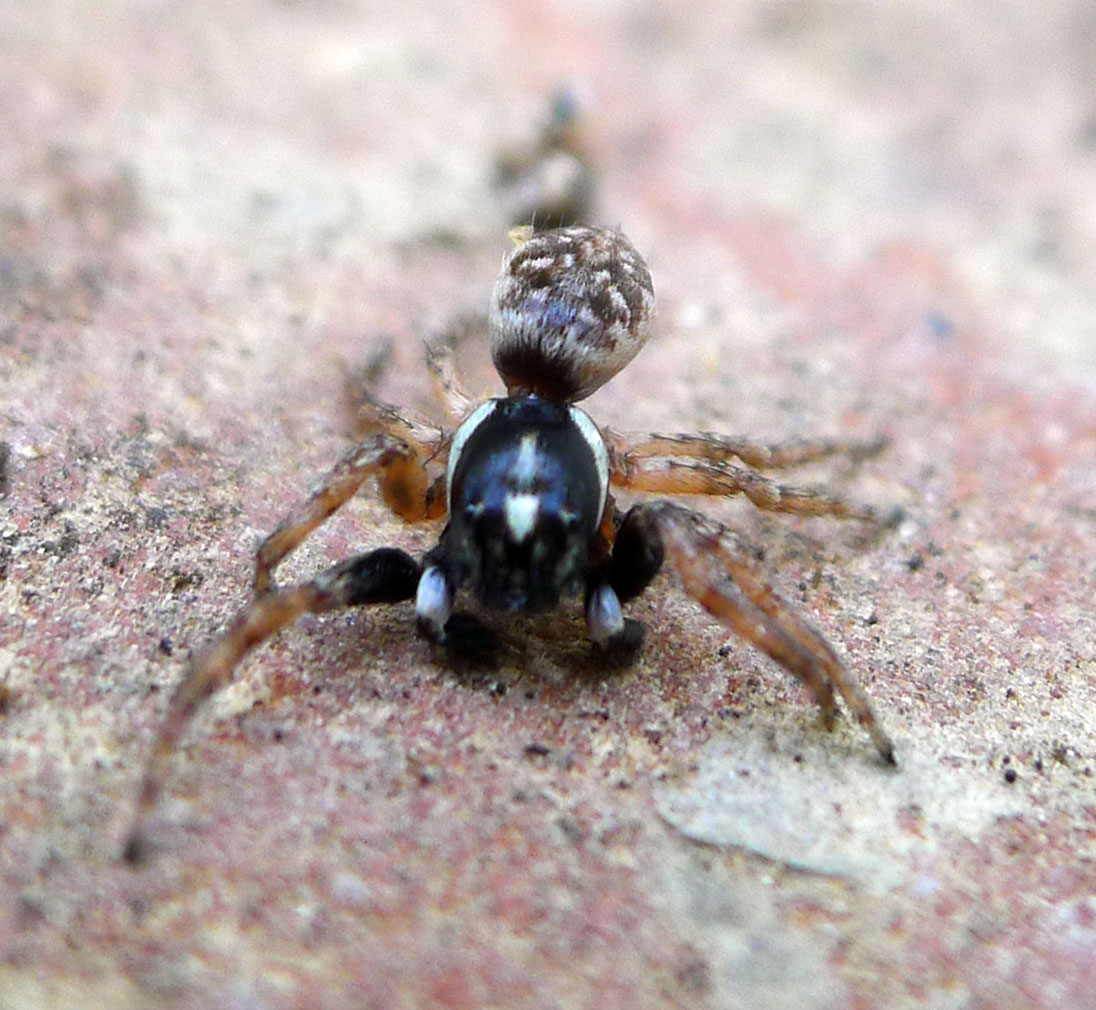
- The related Menemerus semilimbatus

Scientific classification
- Kingdom: Animalia
- Phylum: Arthropoda
- Subphylum: Chelicerata
- Class: Arachnida
- Order: Araneae
- Infraorder: Araneomorphae
- Family: Salticidae
- Genus: Menemerus
- Species: M. cummingorum

Binomial name
- Menemerus cummingorum Wesołowska, 2007

= Menemerus cummingorum =

Species of spider

Menemerus cummingorum is a species of jumping spider in the genus Menemerus that lives in Zimbabwe. The species was first described in 2007 by Wanda Wesołowska, one of over 500 descriptions she has written during her lifetime. It is medium-sized spider, with a flattened cephalothorax that is between 2.2 and 2.4 mm (0.09 and 0.09 in) and an oval abdomen between 2.3 and 2.9 mm (0.09 and 0.11 in) long. The female has a larger abdomen than the male. It is also dark brown and marked with a large yellow leaf-shaped pattern compared to the yellowish-grey of the male. Both the male and female have a dark brown carapace, with a pattern of white streaks, a line and five patches, although the pattern is more pronounced on the male. It has yellow legs, the foremost pair being darker and having brown patches. It is similar to the related Menemerus minshullae, but larger.

== Taxonomy ==
Menemerus cummingorum is a species of jumping spider that was first described by Wanda Wesołowska in 2007. It was one of over 500 species identified by the Polish arachnologist during her career, making her one of the most prolific experts in the field. She allocated the spider to the genus Menemerus, first circumscribed in 1868 by Eugène Simon. It contains over 60 species. The genus name derives from two Greek words, meaning certainly and diurnal.

Genetic analysis has shown that the genus is related to the genera Helvetia and Phintella. The genus shares some characteristics with the genera Hypaeus and Pellenes. The genus was placed in the tribe Heliophaninae, which was renamed Chrysillini by Wayne Maddison in 2015. Chrysillines are monophyletic. The tribe is ubiquitous across most of the continents of the world. It is allocated to the subclade Saltafresia in the clade Salticoida. In 2016, Prószyński created a group of genera named Menemerines after the genus. The vast majority of the species in Menemerines are members of the genus, with additional examples from Kima and Leptorchestes. The species is named in honour of Meg and David Cummings, Zimbabweans who collected and described many jumping spiders.

== Description ==
Menemerus cummingorum is a medium-sized spider. The male has a flattened cephalothorax that is between 2.2 and 2.3 mm (0.09 and 0.09 in) long and between 1.7 and 1.8 mm (0.07 and 0.07 in) wide. The carapace is dark brown, with a pattern of white streaks formed of hairs on the lateral edges, an ill-defined line behind the foremost eyes, a triangular patch on the fovea and four patches on the thorax. It has a black eye field with long brown bristles scattered around the eyes themselves. The spider has a very low face, or clypeus, that is covered in white hairs. The mouthparts, including the chelicerae, labium and maxilae, are dark brown, as is the base of the cephalothorax, or sternum. The abdomen is between 2.3 and 2.6 mm (0.09 and 0.10 in) long and between 1.4 and 1.5 mm (0.06 and 0.06 in) wide. It is yellowish-grey with a pattern consisting of a faint fawn streak down the middle and a scattered with silver spots. The sides are dark with brown patches. It is covered in dense brown and grey hairs, which are longer to the edges. The underside has a large dark patch. It has dark spinnerets and yellow legs. The front pair of legs are darker and have brown patches. All have brown spines and dense brown and grey hairs. The pedipalps are light brown with light grey hairs. The palpal bulb is oval with a double embolus that has a large prolateral lamella, or secondary appendage. The palpal tibia has a thick spine-like apophysis, or spike-like protrusion. There is also a patella with a short wide apophysis. The palpal femur is short and swollen.

The female is similar in size to the male, although it has a larger abdomen. It has a cephalothorax that is between 2.2 and 2.4 mm (0.09 and 0.09 in) long and between 1.7 and 1.8 mm (0.07 and 0.07 in) wide and an abdomen between 2.6 and 2.9 mm (0.10 and 0.11 in) long and between 1.6 and 1.7 mm (0.06 and 0.07 in) wide. The carapace is very similar to the male, although the patterns are less obvious. The maxillae have yellowish chewing margins. The remainder of the mouthparts and sternum are similar to the male. The abdomen is dark brown and has a large yellow leaf-shaped pattern on the top. The underside is dark grey and has two lines of dots that run along it. The spinnerets are dark brown with tufts of white hair at their roots. The legs are similarly yellow, apart from the patches of brown on the front pair. The epigyne has a central ridge separating two rounded depressions and gonopores hidden inside very highly sclerotized round cups. The copulatory openings lead to narrow insemination ducts and spherical spermathecae. There are long accessory glands.

Spiders of the Menemerus genus are difficult to distinguish. The spider is similar to the related Menemerus minshullae, but is larger. The copulatory organs enable the species to be identified. The male has a distinctive tibial apophysis while the female has rounded depressions in its epigyne rather than the ovals in the other species.

== Distribution and habitat ==
Menemerus spiders are found throughout Africa and Asia, and have been identified as far as Latin America. Menemerus cummingorum is endemic to Zimbabwe. The male holotype was found in 2000 near Lake Chivero, 30 km (19 mi) southwest of Harare by Meg Cumming, after which the spider is named. Other examples have also been found in the local area.
