= Menemerus placidus =

Scientific classification
- Kingdom: Animalia
- Phylum: Arthropoda
- Subphylum: Chelicerata
- Class: Arachnida
- Order: Araneae
- Infraorder: Araneomorphae
- Family: Salticidae
- Genus: Menemerus
- Species: M. placidus

Binomial name
- Menemerus placidus Wesołowska, 1999

Species of spider

Menemerus placidus is a jumping spider species in the genus Menemerus that lives in Namibia. It was first described by Wanda Wesołowska in 1999.
