= Helvetia (spider) =

Scientific classification
- Kingdom: Animalia
- Phylum: Arthropoda
- Subphylum: Chelicerata
- Class: Arachnida
- Order: Araneae
- Infraorder: Araneomorphae
- Family: Salticidae
- Subfamily: Salticinae
- Genus: Helvetia; Peckham & Peckham, 1894

Type species
- Helvetia santarema Peckham & Peckham, 1894

Species
- See text.

Genus of spiders

Helvetia is a Neotropical genus of the spider family Salticidae (jumping spiders). The genus name is derived from Helvetia.

== Systematics ==
Helvetia is a small genus belonging to the subfamily Salticinae. Currently, it comprises eleven valid species.

- Helvetia albovittata Simon, 1901 – Paraguay, Argentina, Galapagos Islands
- Helvetia cancrimana (Taczanowski, 1872) – Brazil, Argentina, French Guiana
- Helvetia galianoae Ruiz & Brescovit, 2008 – Argentina
- Helvetia humillima Mello-Leitão, 1943 – Brazil
- Helvetia insularis (Banks, 1902) – junior synonym of Helvetia albovittata
- Helvetia labiata Ruiz & Brescovit, 2008 – Brazil
- Helvetia rinaldiae Ruiz & Brescovit, 2008 – Brazil
- Helvetia riojanensis Galiano, 1965 – Argentina
- Helvetia roeweri (Soares & Camargo, 1948)
- Helvetia santarema Peckham & Peckham, 1894 – Brazil, Argentina
- Helvetia semialba (Simon, 1901) – Brazil
- Helvetia stridulans Ruiz & Brescovit, 2008 – Brazil
- Helvetia zebrina Simon, 1901 – junior synonym of Helvetia cancrimana
- Helvetia zonata Simon, 1901 – junior synonym of Helvetia cancrimana
