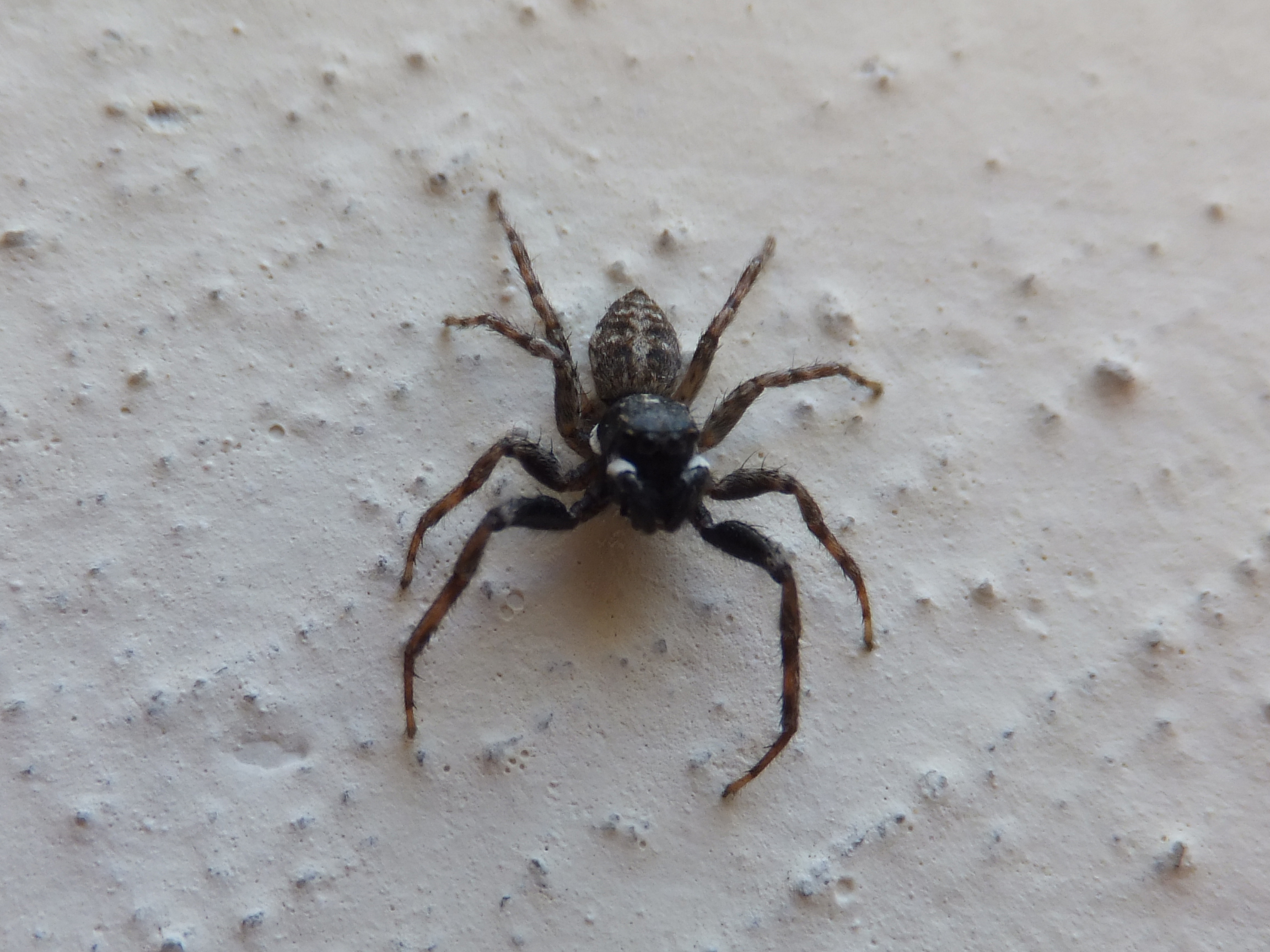
- The related Menemerus semilimbatus

Scientific classification
- Kingdom: Animalia
- Phylum: Arthropoda
- Subphylum: Chelicerata
- Class: Arachnida
- Order: Araneae
- Infraorder: Araneomorphae
- Family: Salticidae
- Genus: Menemerus
- Species: M. regius

Binomial name
- Menemerus regius Wesołowska, 1999

= Menemerus regius =

Species of spider

Menemerus regius is a species of jumping spider in the genus Menemerus that lives in Ethiopia. The species was first identified in 1999 by Wanda Wesołowska. The spider has been found living in low vegetation, on trees and in houses. It is small, with a brown hairy carapace that is between 1.9 and 2.4 millimetres (0.075 and 0.094 in) long and a yellowish-grey or greyish-beige abdomen that is between 2.1 and 3.0 millimetres (0.083 and 0.118 in) in length. The female is slightly larger than the male. The carapace has a large yellowish patch and the abdomen a stripe down the middle. The spider has yellow legs. The spider is similar to others in the genus. However, its copulatory organs are distinctive. The male lacks the ventral tibial apophysis normally found on its palpal bulb and instead has an unusual double tibial apophysis with one bulbous appendage and the other shaped like a horn. The female has a characteristic shape to its epigyne with two rounded depressions to the front and a noticeable notch to the rear.

== Taxonomy ==
Menemerus regius is a species of jumping spider that was first described by Wanda Wesołowska in 1999. It was one of over 500 species identified by the Polish arachnologist during her career, making her one of the most prolific in the field. She allocated the spider to the genus Menemerus. The genus was first described in 1868 by Eugène Simon and contains over 60 species. The genus name derives from two Greek words, meaning certainly and diurnal. The genus shares some characteristics with the genera Hypaeus and Pellenes.

Genetic analysis has shown that the genus Menemerus is related to the genera Helvetia and Phintella. Previously placed in the tribe Heliophaninae, the tribe was reconstituted as Chrysillini by Wayne Maddison in 2015, The tribe is ubiquitous across most continents of the world. it is allocated to the subclade Saltafresia in the clade Salticoida. In 2016, Prószyński created a group of genera named Menemerines after the genus. The vast majority of the species in Menemerines are members of the genus, with additional examples from Kima and Leptorchestes. The species name derives from the Latin word for royal. Menemerus regius is related to Menemerus rabaudi.

== Description ==
Menemerus regius is a small spider. The male has a carapace that is between 1.9 and 2.2 mm (0.075 and 0.087 in) long and 1.5 and 1.6 mm (0.059 and 0.063 in) wide. It is brown and covered in brown hairs, with a large yellowish patch visible on the top. The eye field is darker and long brown bristles can be found near the eyes. The underside, our sternum, is yellow-orange. The spider has characteristic mouthparts with brown chelicerae, while the labium and maxilae are light brown. It has an abdomen that is between 2.1 and 2.6 mm (0.083 and 0.102 in) long and 1.6 and 1.9 mm (0.063 and 0.075 in) wide. It light, generally yellowish-grey with a brownish stripe down the middle of the top and a lighter underside. It has yellowish-grey spinnerets. The legs are generally yellow, but there are areas that are brown. The pedipalps, which are brown with white hairs, have a double embolus with a narrow conductor. The spider has an unusual projection on its palpal tibia, or tibial apophysis, that consists of two branches, the uppermost larger and more bulbous, the lower more curved and horn-like.

The female is larger than the male with a carapace that is between 2.2 and 2.4 mm (0.087 and 0.094 in) in length and 1.5 and 1.7 mm (0.059 and 0.067 in) in width and an abdomen that is between 2.6 and 3.0 mm (0.10 and 0.12 in) long and 1.7 and 2.1 mm (0.067 and 0.083 in) wide. The carapace is similar. The abdomen is darker, greyish-beige, with a light stripe down the middle. The legs are completely yellow. The epigyne is somewhat elongated and has two rounded depressions to the front and a noticeable notch to the rear. The copulatory openings lead to initially curly insemination ducts that continue to have a complex morphology throughout their run. The accessory glands are long. The spermathecae are pear-shaped.

Spiders of the Menemerus genus are difficult to distinguish. The copulatory organs most have the identify the species. The female can be identified by the way that the epigyne is longer than it is wide. The male has a very distinctive lateral tibial apophysis. It lacks the ventral tibial apophysis often found in other species in the genus.

== Behaviour ==
Due to their good eyesight, Menemerus spiders are mostly diurnal hunters. They attack using a complex approach to their prey and are generally more proactive in comparison to web-spinning spiders. The spiders will eat a wide range of prey, including nectar. They undertake complex displays and dances during courtship. The males also undertake aggressive displays between themselves.

== Distribution and habitat ==
Menemerus spiders are found throughout Africa and Asia, and have been identified as far as Latin America. Menemerus regius is endemic to Ethiopia. The male holotype was found near Bishoftu [at an altitude of 1,400 m (4,600 ft) above sea level in 1988. Other examples have been found near Lake Ziway in 1982 and in Addis Ababa in 1988. The spider seems to enjoy living near lakes. One example was found on the trunk of a Ficus sycomorus tree. It has been found in houses and in low vegetation.
