= Helvetia semialba =

Scientific classification
- Kingdom: Animalia
- Phylum: Arthropoda
- Subphylum: Chelicerata
- Class: Arachnida
- Order: Araneae
- Infraorder: Araneomorphae
- Family: Salticidae
- Genus: Helvetia
- Species: H. semialba

Binomial name
- Helvetia semialba (Simon, 1901)

Species of spider

Helvetia semialba is a species of jumping spiders only found in Brazil.
