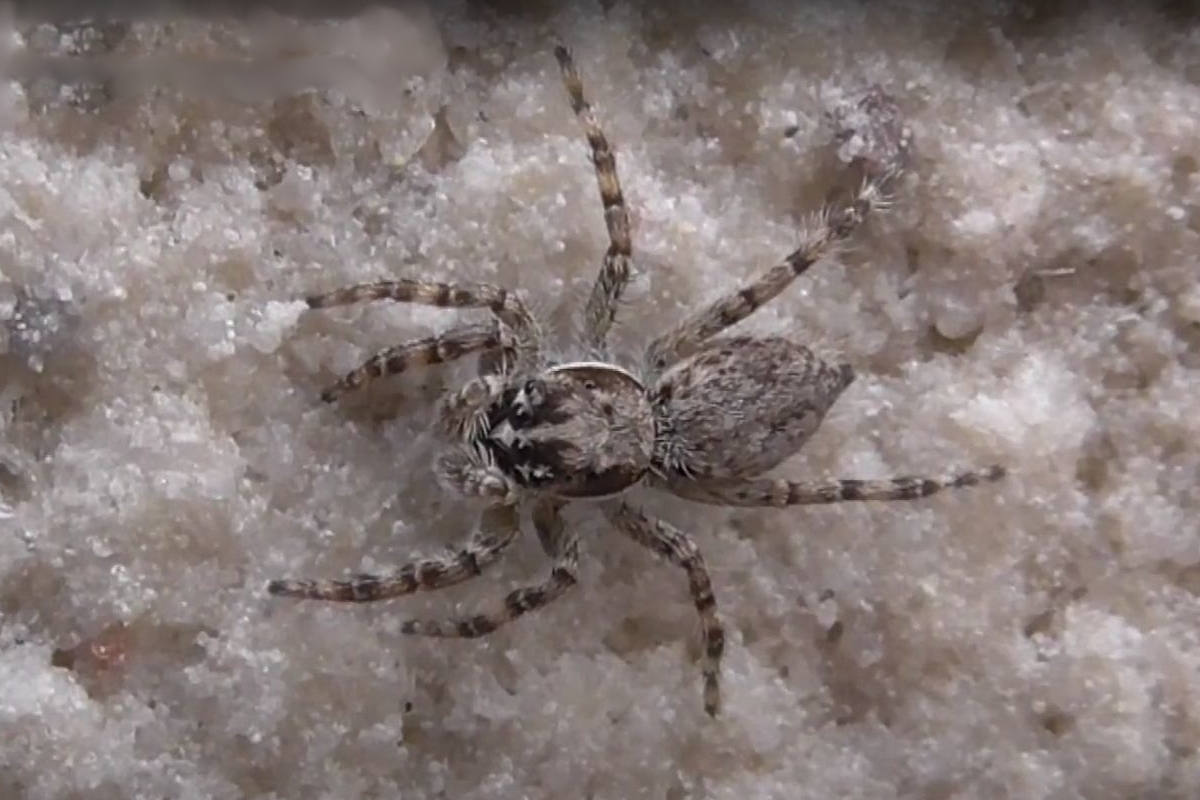
- In Tokyo, Japan

Scientific classification
- Kingdom: Animalia
- Phylum: Arthropoda
- Subphylum: Chelicerata
- Class: Arachnida
- Order: Araneae
- Infraorder: Araneomorphae
- Family: Salticidae
- Genus: Menemerus
- Species: M. brachygnathus

Binomial name
- Menemerus brachygnathus Thorell, 1887

= Menemerus brachygnathus =

Species of spider

Menemerus brachygnathus is a species of jumping spider. Its Japanese name translates to 'white-bearded jumping spider', due to the white hair-like structures (trichobothria) on its limbs and body.

== Distribution ==
Menemerus brachygnathus is found in various places in Asia including Nepal, India, Thailand and Japan.

== Description ==
Menemerus brachygnathus is mottled brown. Its legs have stripes of dark brown and beige. The female is 8–10 millimetres (0.31–0.39 in) in length while the male is slightly smaller at 6–9 millimetres (0.24–0.35 in).
