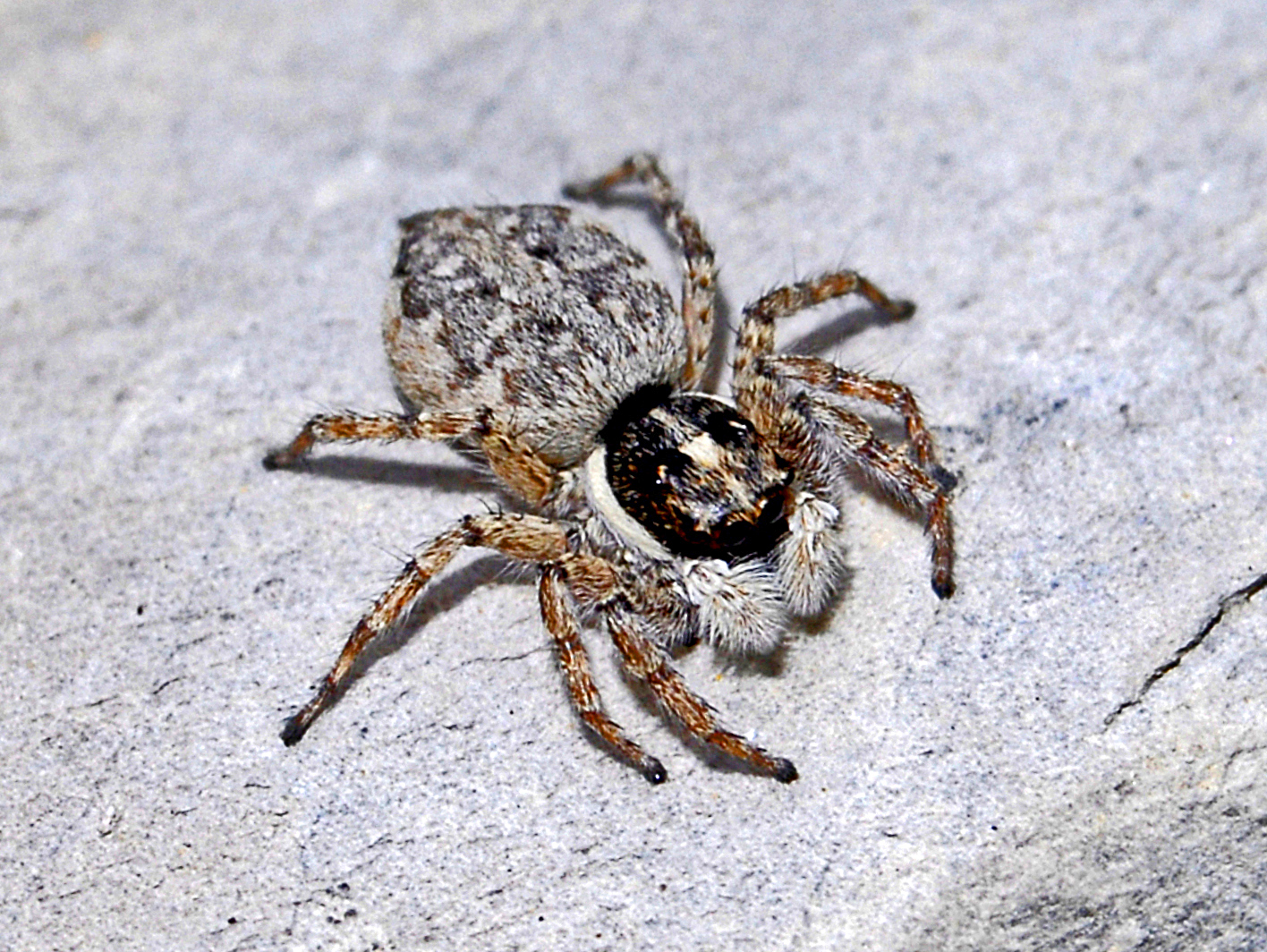
- The related Menemerus semilimbatus

Scientific classification
- Kingdom: Animalia
- Phylum: Arthropoda
- Subphylum: Chelicerata
- Class: Arachnida
- Order: Araneae
- Infraorder: Araneomorphae
- Family: Salticidae
- Genus: Menemerus
- Species: M. modestus

Binomial name
- Menemerus modestus Wesołowska, 1999

= Menemerus modestus =

Species of spider

Menemerus modestus is a species of jumping spider in the genus Menemerus that lives in Tunisia. The species was first identified in 1999 by Wanda Wesołowska, one of over 500 descriptions she produced during her lifetime. The spider is mainly a diurnal hunter. It is small, with a brown carapace that is typically 2.2 mm (0.09 in) long and a light abdomen 2.1 mm (0.08 in) long. The male's copulatory organs have a distinctive configuration of two appendages at the base of the palpal bulb, or apophyses, one larger and bulbous, the other a short spike. The female has not been described.

== Taxonomy ==
Menemerus modestus is a species of jumping spider that was first described by Wanda Wesołowska in 1999. It was one of over 500 species identified by the Polish arachnologist during her career, making her one of the most prolific in the field. She allocated the spider to the genus Menemerus. The genus was first circumscribed in 1868 by Eugène Simon and contains over 60 species. The genus name derives from two Greek words, meaning certainly and diurnal. The genus shares some characteristics with the genera Hypaeus and Pellenes.

Genetic analysis has shown that the genus is related to the genera Helvetia and Phintella. Previously placed in the tribe Heliophaninae, the tribe was reconstituted as Chrysillini by Wayne Maddison in 2015. The tribe is ubiquitous across most continents of the world. it is allocated to the subclade Saltafresia in the clade Salticoida. In 2016, Jerzy Prószyński created a group of genera named Menemerines after the genus. The vast majority of the species in Menemerines are members of the genus, with additional examples from Kima and Leptorchestes. The species name derives from the Latin for quiet, modestus.

== Description ==
Menemerus modestus is a small spider. The male has a brown carapace that is typically 2.2 mm (0.09 in) long and is covered by dense long brown hairs. The eye field is darker and has many greyish-white hairs on it. The spider has distinctive mouthparts including dark brown chelicerae, brown labium and brown maxilae The underside of the carapace, or sternum, is light brown. The spider's abdomen is typically 2.1 mm (0.08 in) long and very light, yellowish with a pattern of a faint fawn stripe barely visible on the top. The underside is yellow. It has light spinnerets and yellow legs. The spider's copulatory organs are distinctive. The pedipalps are brown. The short embolus has a small flap-like accompanying spike, or lamella. The bulb has a distinctive arrangement of its appendages, or apophyses. One is larger and more bulbous. The other is a considerably smaller spike. The female has not been described.

Spiders of the Menemerus genus are difficult to distinguish. This species is particularly similar to the related Menemerus animatus, Menemerus davidi, Menemerus guttatus and Menemerus silver. The males can be most distinguished by the arrangement of the embolus and apophyses. For example, the lower of the two apophyses is smaller than Menemerus guttatus while the more rearward of the two is longer.

== Behaviour ==
Due to their good eyesight, Menemerus spiders are mostly diurnal hunters. They attack using a complex approach to their prey and are generally more proactive in comparison to web-spinning spiders. They undertake complex courtship displays while the males will display aggressively between themselves. The spider is likely to eat nectar.

== Distribution ==
Menemerus spiders are found throughout Africa and Asia, and have been identified as far as Latin America. Menemerus modestus is endemic to Tunisia.
