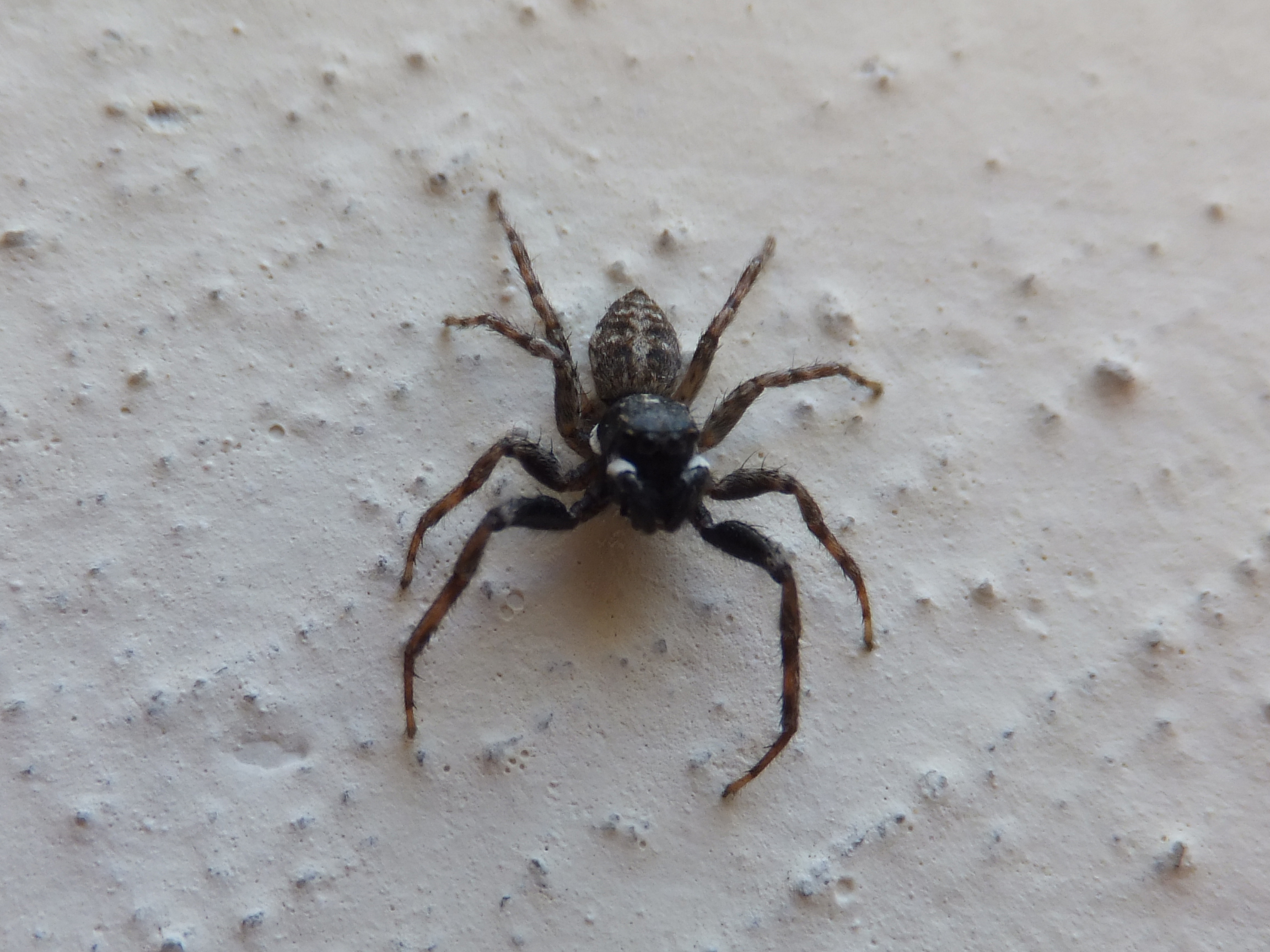
- The related Menemerus semilimbatus

Scientific classification
- Kingdom: Animalia
- Phylum: Arthropoda
- Subphylum: Chelicerata
- Class: Arachnida
- Order: Araneae
- Infraorder: Araneomorphae
- Family: Salticidae
- Genus: Menemerus
- Species: M. paradoxus

Binomial name
- Menemerus paradoxus Wesołowska & van Harten, 1994

= Menemerus paradoxus =

Species of spider

Menemerus paradoxus is a species of jumping spider in the genus Menemerus that lives in Yemen. The spider was first described in 1994 by Wanda Wesołowska and Anthony van Harten. Only the female has been described. The spider is small, with an oval and rather flattened carapace that is typically 2.5 mm (0.10 in) long and an oval abdomen typically 3.2 mm (0.13 in) long. The carapace is brown with a darker, nearly black, eye field and the abdomen is yellowish-grey. The spider's legs are also yellowish-grey. The spider is hard to distinguish from others in the genus, particularly Menemerus tropicus. However, its copulatory organs are distinctive. Menemerus paradoxus is characterised by its large epigyne that has a notch in its rear edge, the way that its copulatory openings are hidden in pockets and its heavily sclerotized spermathecae.

== Taxonomy ==
Menemerus paradoxus is a species of jumping spider that was first described by Wanda Wesołowska and Anthony van Harten in 1994. It was one of over 500 species identified by the Polish arachnologist Wesolowska during her career, making her one of the most prolific in the field. She allocated the spider to the genus Menemerus, first circumscribed in 1868 by Eugène Simon, which contains over 60 species. The genus name derives from two Greek words, meaning certainly and diurnal.

Genetic analysis has shown that the genus Menemerus is related to the genera Helvetia and Phintella. The genus shares some characteristics with the genera Hypaeus and Pellenes. It is a member of the tribe Heliophaninae, renamed Chrysillini by Wayne Maddison in 2015, The tribe is ubiquitous across most continents of the world. It is allocated to the subclade Saltafresia in the clade Salticoida. In 2016, Prószyński created a group of genera named Menemerines after the genus. The vast majority of the species in Menemerines are members of the genus, with additional examples from Kima and Leptorchestes.

== Description ==
Menemerus paradoxus is a small spider. The female has a carapace that is typically 2.5 mm (0.10 in) long and 1.7 mm (0.07 in) wide. It is oval and rather flattened, with a brown topside covered in dense brown and grey hairs. The eye field is very dark, almost black with a small number of brown bristles visible. The spider's face, or clypeus, and the underside of the carapace, or sternum, are brown. The chelicerae are dark brown with two teeth to the front and one to the rear. The remaining mouthparts, the labium and maxilae, are brown, the maxillae with light tips. The spider has an oval abdomen that is typically 3.2 mm (0.13 in) long and 2.1 mm (0.08 in) wide. The topside is yellowish-grey and covered in brown hairs. The underside is light. The spinnerets are grey. The spider has yellowish-grey legs that are covered in brown hairs. The epigyne is rather large and very highly sclerotized. It has a large central depressions and a rear edge punctuated with a notch. The copulatory openings are hidden in pockets. The insemination ducts have thin walls and lead to heavily sclerotized spermathecae. There are also long accessory glands. There are large and deep pockets near the epigastric furrow. The male has not been described.

Spiders of the Menemerus genus are difficult to distinguish. The spider can be identified by its copulatory organs, particularly its internal structure. For example, compared to the related Menemerus tropicus, the spider has a wider pocket in its epigyne and larger spermathecae. The notch on the rear edge of the spider's epigyne is also characteristic of the species.

== Distribution ==
Menemerus spiders are found throughout Africa and Asia, and have been identified as far as Latin America. Menemerus paradoxus is found in Yemen. The female holotype was found in 1991 near Sanaa. It is only found in the Sanaa Governorate.
