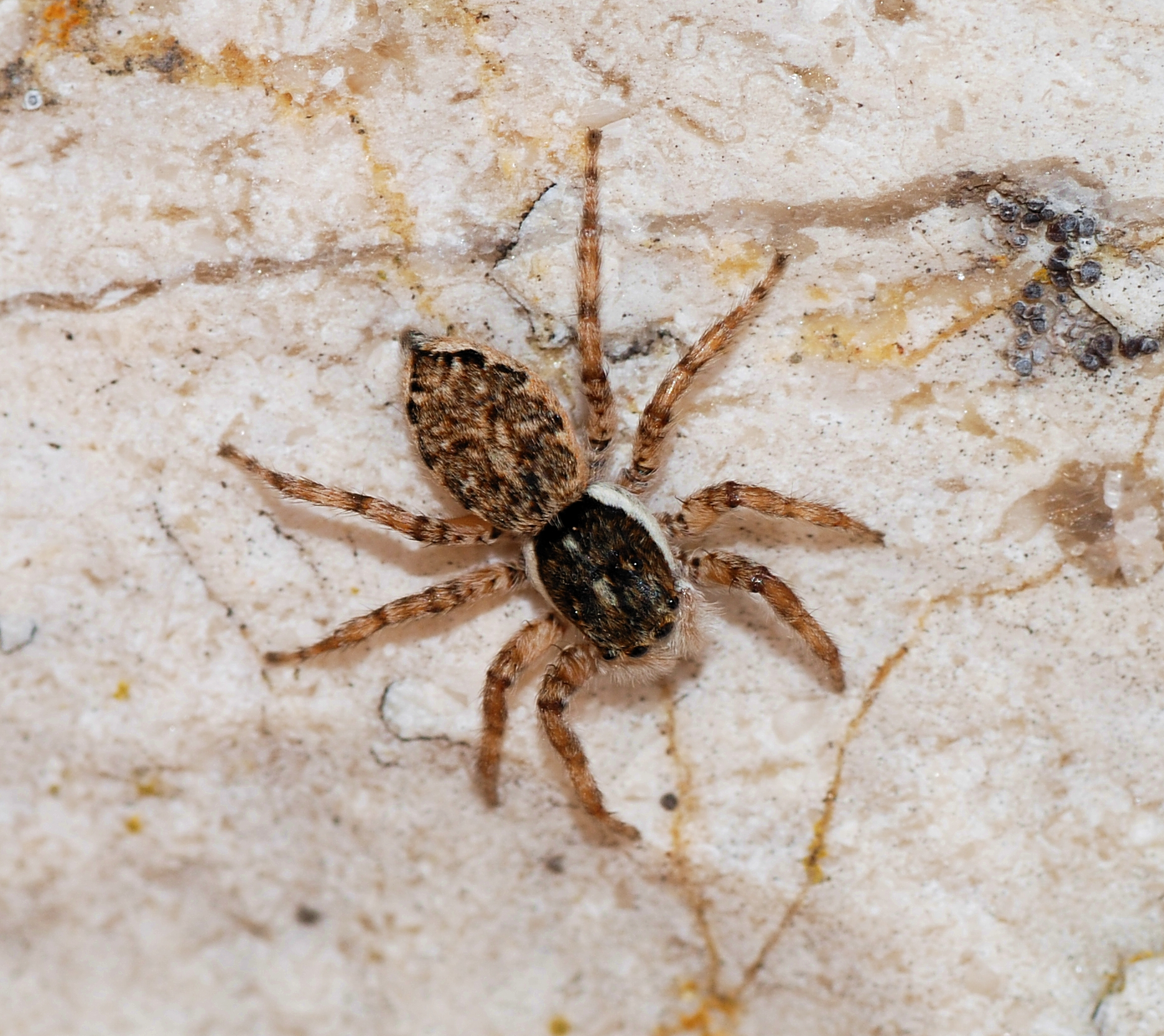
- The related Menemerus semilimbatus

Scientific classification
- Kingdom: Animalia
- Phylum: Arthropoda
- Subphylum: Chelicerata
- Class: Arachnida
- Order: Araneae
- Infraorder: Araneomorphae
- Family: Salticidae
- Genus: Menemerus
- Species: M. animatus

Binomial name
- Menemerus animatus O. P-Cambridge, 1876

= Menemerus animatus =

Species of spider

Menemerus animatus is a species of jumping spider in the genus Menemerus that lives across the Mediterranean Basin and into the Afrotropical realm. The species was first described in 1876 by Octavius Pickard-Cambridge based on an example from Egypt. It has subsequently been found living across many countries from Algeria to Greece and Senegal to Yemen. It prefers living in sandy environments.

The spider is medium-sized, with a carapace that is between 2.1 and 2.9 mm long and an abdomen that is between 2.2 and 4.7 mm in length. The female is larger than the male. The carapace is dark brown with a characteristic triangular pattern. The abdomen is light with a narrow brown stripe down the middle. The spinnerets and legs are yellow. The male spider has a short reproductive part called an embolus, which is missing a helper organ often found in other species, known as a secondary conductor. Additionally, the male has a straight spike, known as an apophysis, on a part of pedipalp called the tibia. The female, in contrast, has unique, very narrow fissure-like openings leading to its reproductive ducts. It also has special glands located in front of the reproductive openings.

Menemerus animatus is very similar in appearance to the related Menemerus davidi, differing in minor details like the presence of a white margin on underside of the carapace. Likewise, it can be distinguished from Menemerus semilimbatus by the long spines on its legs. Otherwise, it is hard to tell apart from other species in its genus without a study of its copulatory organs.

== Taxonomy ==
Menemerus animatus is a species of jumping spider that was first described by Octavius Pickard-Cambridge in 1876 based on an example from Egypt. He allocated the spider to the genus Menemerus. The genus was first circumscribed in 1868 by Eugène Simon and contains over 60 species. The species is named for a Latin word that can be translated "animated" or "courageous". The genus name derives from two Greek words, meaning "certainly" and "diurnal".

Phylogenetic analysis has shown that the genus is related to the genera Helvetia and Phintella. The genus also shares some characteristics with the genera Hypaeus and Pellenes. It is a member of the tribe Heliophaninae, renamed Chrysillini by Wayne Maddison in 2015. Chrysillines are monophyletic. The tribe is ubiquitous across most of the continents of the world. It is allocated to the subclade Saltafresia in the clade Salticoida. In 2016, Jerzy Prószyński created a group of genera named Menemerines after the genus. The vast majority of the species in Menemerines are members of the genus, with additional examples from Kima and Leptorchestes.

== Description ==
Menemerus animatus is a medium-sized spider with unique physical features. The spider's body is divided into two main parts: the cephalothorax, which is long and broad, and the abdomen, which is narrower and oval-shaped. Males of this species have a carapace, the hard upper part of the cephalothorax, measuring between 2.1 and 2.8 mm (0.08 and 0.11 in) in length and 1.5 and 2.1 mm (0.06 and 0.08 in) in width. The carapace is dark brown but has a distinctive triangular patch of white hairs, while the rest of it is covered with greyish-white hair, including the area around the eyes, which is darker. The spider's face, known as the clypeus, is adorned with short white hairs.

The mouthparts, consisting of brown chelicerae and lighter brown labium and maxilae, contrast with the yellow sternum, the underside of the cephalothorax. The abdomen, ranging from 2.2 and 3.6 mm (0.09 and 0.14 in) in length and 1.4 and 1.9 mm (0.06 and 0.07 in) in width, is primarily light-colored with a narrow brown stripe down the middle. This area is covered in dense light hairs interspersed with brown bristles and small silver patches, and its underside has a yellowish hue. The spider's spinnerets and legs are yellow, with leg hairs and spines being brown. The pedipalps, sensory organs near the mouth, are brown with white hairs visible on the palpal femur.

A key feature of the male Menemerus animatus is its embolus, part of the reproductive system, which is short and slightly curved towards the palpal bulb. This species lacks the secondary conductor, an appendage that accompanies the embolus, found in other species of its genus. It also has a single small tibial apophysis, a projection on the pedipalp tibia. Specimens found in Algeria, Egypt, and Saudi Arabia show variations in this structure, with those from Algeria having much shorter, triangular tibial apophyses, and those from Saudi Arabia featuring a longer tibial apophysis and an embolus that ends in a gentle curve.

The female of the species is larger than the male with a carapace that is between 2.5 and 2.9 mm (0.10 and 0.11 in) in length and 1.9 and 2.1 mm (0.07 and 0.08 in) in width and an abdomen between 3.0 and 4.7 mm (0.12 and 0.19 in) in length and 2.1 and 3.2 mm (0.08 and 0.13 in) in width. It is similar in appearance to the male, differing only superficially in its external aspects. The carapace is hairy, with more light grey hairs visible. The white hairs on the clypeus are more noticeable. The spinnerets have a light brown margin but are otherwise yellow as they are on the male. The legs are similarly yellow but some have brown ringlets on them. The epigyne is relatively small and simple with the copulatory openings situated side by side in the middle. The entrance to the copulatory openings are unusual as they have fissured entrances. These are characteristic for the species. There is evidence of some sclerotization but not as much as other species. There are also wide entrance bowls at the start of the copulatory openings in which the male deposits sperm during copulation. Internally, there are accessory glands situated in front of the copulatory openings.

== Similar species ==
Spiders of the Menemerus genus are very similar in appearance and difficult to distinguish. Menemerus animatus is no exception. The species is particularly similar to the related Menemerus davidi. Externally, they are very hard to tell apart, although this spider differs in having a white margin to the underside of the carapace, a more distinct triangular pattern on the topside, the denser hairs on the clypeus and the clearer abdominal pattern. It is also superficically similar to Menemerus guttatus, Menemerus modestus and Menemerus soldani. Compared to these species is best identified by its copulatory organs. The male Menemerus animatus can be identified its single embolus. The female can be distinguished by its fissured entrance to the insemination ducts, the morphology of its internal organs, particularly the arrangement of the accessory glands, and the presence of its large entrance bowls. Distinguishing the spider from Menemerus semilimbatus requires observing the long spines on its legs. The male can be differentiated from Menemerus congoensis by its straight tibial apophysis, or spike. It can be distinguished from Menemerus rubicundus by the latter's larger, plate-shaped dorsal tibial apophysis.

== Behaviour ==
Due to their good eyesight, Menemerus spiders are mostly diurnal hunters. They attack using a complex approach to their prey and are generally more proactive in comparison to web-spinning spiders, attacking prey from a wide range of directions, including ambushing and stalking. The spiders will eat a wide range of prey, including nectar. They undertake complex displays and dances during courtship. The males also undertake aggressive displays between themselves, although actual injury is rare.

== Distribution and habitat ==
Menemerus spiders are found throughout Africa and Asia, and have been identified as far as Latin America. Menemerus animatus lives in an area that stretches across the Mediterranean Basin and into the Afrotropical realm. Initially, the spider was discovered in North Africa. The holotype was found in Lower Egypt. Other examples were identified in Giza in 1904 and Siwa Oasis in 1935.

The spider was soon observed in other countries, extending the species distribution further. The species was discovered by Pickard-Cambridge in Israel based on a specimen found in 1833 and a further example was collected by George and Elizabeth Peckham in the Libyan desert. Other examples were discovered in southern Algeria. The first example seen in Europe was described by Simon in 1884 from specimens found in Greece. The spider was found near the Sobat River in Sudan in 1914. It was subsequently also identified at Wadi Halfa in 1962 and near Khartoum in 1967. The first example seen in Mali was discovered in Bandiagara in 1978 with others following from Goundam the following year. It was first found in Mauritania in Nouakchott in 1993. Examples have been discovered in Khulays, Saudi Arabia. It has also been seen to live in Iraq, Senegal, and Yemen. The first example to be identified in Turkey was found in Elazığ Province in 2022.

Menemerus animatus generally lives in desert climates, although often near water, whether rivers or wadis. Simon noted that the spider prefers to live in sandy areas rather than on rocks. Some examples also live in gardens and areas of human habitation, such as Timimoun, Algeria, where it was first seen in 1989.
