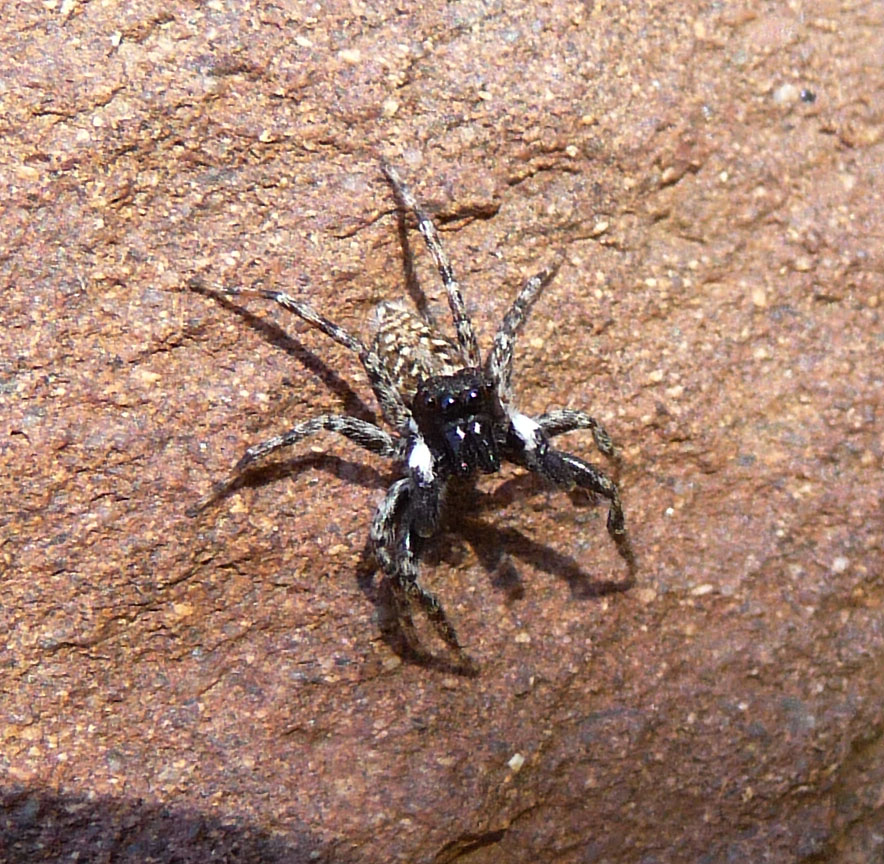
- The related Menemerus semilimbatus

Scientific classification
- Kingdom: Animalia
- Phylum: Arthropoda
- Subphylum: Chelicerata
- Class: Arachnida
- Order: Araneae
- Infraorder: Araneomorphae
- Family: Salticidae
- Genus: Menemerus
- Species: M. plenus

Binomial name
- Menemerus plenus Wesołowska & van Harten, 1994

= Menemerus plenus =

Species of spider

Menemerus plenus is a species of jumping spider in the genus Menemerus that lives in Yemen. The spider was first described in 1994 by Wanda Wesołowska and Anthonius van Harten. Only the female has been described. The spider is small, with a carapace that is typically 2.0 mm (0.08 in) long and an abdomen typically 3.3 mm (0.13 in) long. The carapace is brown, convex and higher than many related spiders. The abdomen is wide and rounded. It is externally similar to Menemerus pulcher and can only be reliably distinguished by comparing the internal structure of the copulatory organs. Menemerus plenus is distinctive for its lack of accessory glands and the thick wall of its insemination ducts.

== Taxonomy ==
Menemerus plenus is a species of jumping spider that was first described by Wanda Wesołowska and Anthonius van Harten in 1994. It was one of over 500 species identified by the Polish arachnologist Wesolowska during her career, making her one of the most prolific in the field. They allocated the spider to the genus Menemerus, first circumscribed in 1868 by Eugène Simon, which contains over 60 species. The genus name derives from two Greek words, meaning certainly and diurnal.

Genetic analysis has shown that the genus Menemerus is related to the genera Helvetia and Phintella. The genus shares some characteristics with the genera Hypaeus and Pellenes. It is a member of the tribe Heliophaninae, renamed Chrysillini by Wayne Maddison in 2015, This tribe is ubiquitous across most continents of the world. It is allocated to the subclade Saltafresia in the clade Salticoida. In 2016, Prószyński created a group of genera named Menemerines after the genus. The vast majority of the species in Menemerines are members of the genus, with additional examples from Kima and Leptorchestes.

== Description ==
Menemerus plenus is a small spider. The female has a carapace that is typically 2.0 mm (0.08 in) long and 1.9 mm (0.07 in) wide. It is brown, convex, higher than many related species and covered in short brown and grey hairs. The area around the eye is black with a small number of brown bristles visible. The chelicerae is brown with two teeth to the front and one to the rear. The clypeus, labium and maxilae are brown with pale tips. The sternum is also brown. The spider has a wider more rounded abdomen than many others in the genus, typically 3.3 mm (0.13 in) long and 2.5 mm (0.10 in) wide. It is greyish-russet and covered in brownish hairs with a pattern of yellowish-white patches making a herring-bone shape in the middle and irregular spots on the sides. There is a lighter line at the very front of the abdomen. The underside is dark grey. The spinnerets are also dark grey. The spider has light brown legs that are covered in dark hairs and spines. The epigyne is oval and very highly sclerotized. It has two shallow depressions in the middle and two copulatory openings placed to the rear. The insemination ducts follow a single loop and have thick walls. The spermathecae are small and leaf-shaped. The male has not been described.

Spiders of the Menemerus genus are difficult to distinguish. Externally, the spider is very similar to Menemerus pulcher. The spider can be identified by its copulatory organs, particularly its internal structure. The most noticeable features of the species is the lack of accessory organs common in other species in the genus and the thick-wall of the insemination ducts.

== Distribution ==
Menemerus spiders are found throughout Africa and Asia, and have been identified as far as Latin America. Menemerus plenus is found in Yemen. It lives in the Ibb Governorate. The female holotype was found in 1992 between Ibb and Yarim.
