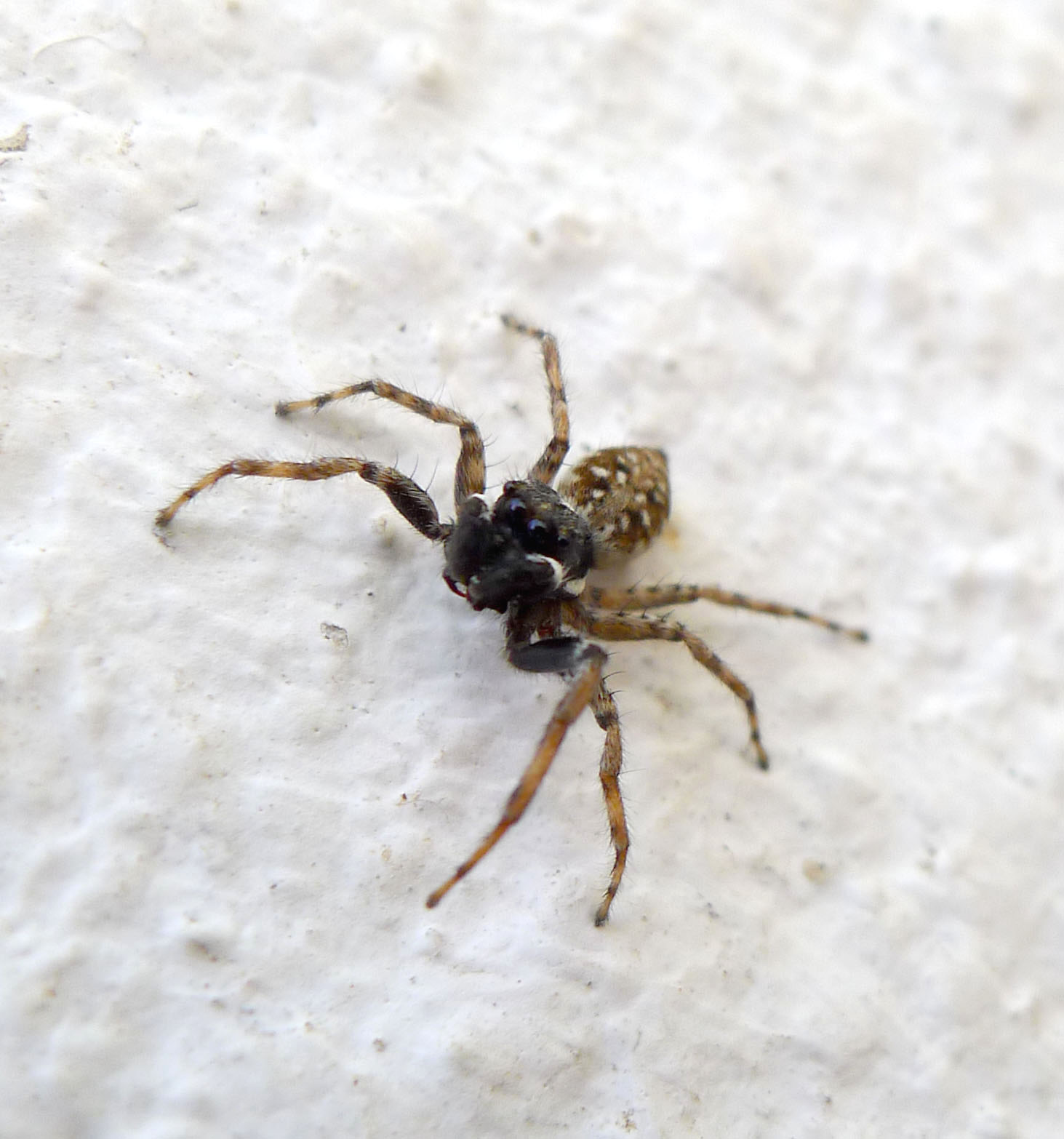
- The related Menemerus semilimbatus

Scientific classification
- Kingdom: Animalia
- Phylum: Arthropoda
- Subphylum: Chelicerata
- Class: Arachnida
- Order: Araneae
- Infraorder: Araneomorphae
- Family: Salticidae
- Genus: Menemerus
- Species: M. soldani

Binomial name
- Menemerus soldani (Audouin, 1826)

= Menemerus soldani =

Species of spider

Menemerus soldani is a species of jumping spider in the genus Menemerus that lives in Algeria, Egypt and Tunisia. It was first described in 1826 by Jean Victor Audouin. He identified both the male and female but not in much detail and it was not until 1999 that a thorough description was completed. This led to confusion, with many museums holding examples of different species labelled Menemerus soldani. When the female was described by Hippolyte Lucas and Wanda Wesołowska, they were designated as different species, both of these being declared junior synonyms by subsequent arachnologists. The spider is small, with a total length between 3.11 and 5.65 mm (0.122 and 0.222 in), and has a brown carapace, yellow abdomen and orange legs. The spiders have characteristic copulatory organs. The female has a characteristic semi-circular notch at the rear of its epigyne while the male has a large bulbous patellar apophysis that other species in the genus lack. The male has a flat projection or apophysis on its pedipalp tibia. The spider lives in palm groves and Quercus suber forests.

== Taxonomy ==
Menemerus soldani is a species of jumping spider that was first described by Jean Victor Audouin in 1826. He identified both a male and female but with little detail and only a picture of the female. The original specimens have been lost. He allocated it to the genus Attus, which had been circumscribed by Charles Walckenaer in 1805 and contained a very large number of jumping spider species. In 1876, Eugène Simon moved the spider to the genus Menemerus, which he had first circumscribed in 1868. It contains over 60 species. The genus name derives from two Greek words, meaning certainly and diurnal.

Genetic analysis has shown that the genus is related to the genera Helvetia and Phintella. It shares some characteristics with the genera Hypaeus and Pellenes. The genus was placed in the tribe Heliophaninae, which was renamed Chrysillini by Wayne Maddison in 2015. The tribe is ubiquitous across most of the continents of the world. it is allocated to the subclade Saltafresia in the clade Salticoida. In 2016, Prószyński created a group of genera named Menemerines after the genus. The vast majority of the species in Menemerines are members of the genus, with additional examples from the genera Kima and Leptorchestes.

The spider has two synonyms. Salticus rufolimbatus was first described by Hippolyte Lucas in 1846 based on a female specimen. Simon recognised that this was the same spider and designated this a junior synonym in 1901. Similarly, Wanda Wesołowska described a new species that she named Menemerus silver in 1999. This was recognised as the female of the species in 2022. Menemerus soldani has also been particularly prone to misidentification. In 1947, Jacques Denis identified an example found in Siwa Oasis, Egypt, which turned out to be Menemerus fagei. Another example, also found in Egypt, was in fact Menemerus bivittatus. Others, found in South Africa, are actually Menemerus transvaalicus.

== Description ==
A detailed description of both the male and female were only made in 1999, over 150 years after they had been first identified. The spider is small. The male has a total length between 3.11 and 5.65 mm (0.122 and 0.222 in). It has a carapace that measures between 1.74 and 2.93 mm (0.069 and 0.115 in) in length and 1.18 and 1.97 mm (0.046 and 0.078 in) in width. The carapace is flat and dark brown with a small stripe at the very rear formed of white hairs. There are also white hairs scattered over the surface. The eye field is black. The mouthparts, consisting of chelicerae, labium and maxilae, are brown. The abdomen is typically 2.5 millimetres (0.098 in) long, yellow on both the top and bottom with some long dense fawn hairs visible. The spinnerets are light. The spider has orange legs with brown hairs and spines. The pedipalps are brown with white hairs on the femur. The spider has distinctive copulatory organs. The palpal bulb has a double embolus with the conductor very closely fitted to the actual embolus so that it looks like one from some angles. The projection on the palpal tibia, the tibial apophysis, is flat and rounded with a pronounced bulbous apophysis on it patellar, the section of the pedipalp between the palpal bulb and the tibia.

The female is similar in size to the male. It is between 4.68 and 4.97 mm (0.184 and 0.196 in) in total length and has a carapace that is between 2.04 and 2.45 mm (0.080 and 0.096 in) long and 1.34 and 1.82 mm (0.053 and 0.072 in) wide. The carapace is light brown. There is a large triangular patch formed of lighter hairs in the middle. The chelicerae are brown but the labium and maxillae are yellow. The abdomen is also yellowish and between 3.0 and 3.3 mm (0.12 and 0.13 in) in length. There are patches of silver visible along with brown patches formed of darker hairs. The epigyne is large. It has a clearly visible semi-circular notch at the very rear. The copulatory openings are well separated and the insemination ducts run parallel to epigastric fold.

Spiders of the Menemerus genus are difficult to distinguish. This is made more difficult as museums contain many different species of jumping spider mislabelled Menemerus soldani. The female is very similar to Menemerus animatus, Menemerus davidi and Menemerus guttatus but can be distinguished by the large notch at the rear of the epigyne. The pocket in the epigyne is also narrower than other species. The male can be identified by its large patellar apophysis.

== Distribution and habitat ==
Menemerus spiders are found throughout Africa and Asia, and have been identified as far as Latin America. Menemerus soldani can be found in Algeria, Egypt and Tunisia. Simon considered that that had a wider species distribution that spread from Senegal to Yemen. The holotype was found in Egypt and both mature and juveniles have been identified in Alexandria. Examples have also been found in Kizida and Nefzana in Tunisia. The first example examined from Algeria was found near Ghardaïa at an altitude of 462 m (1,516 ft) above sea level in 2016. Other examples were found near towns like Berriane. It lives in palm groves and in forests of Quercus suber trees.
