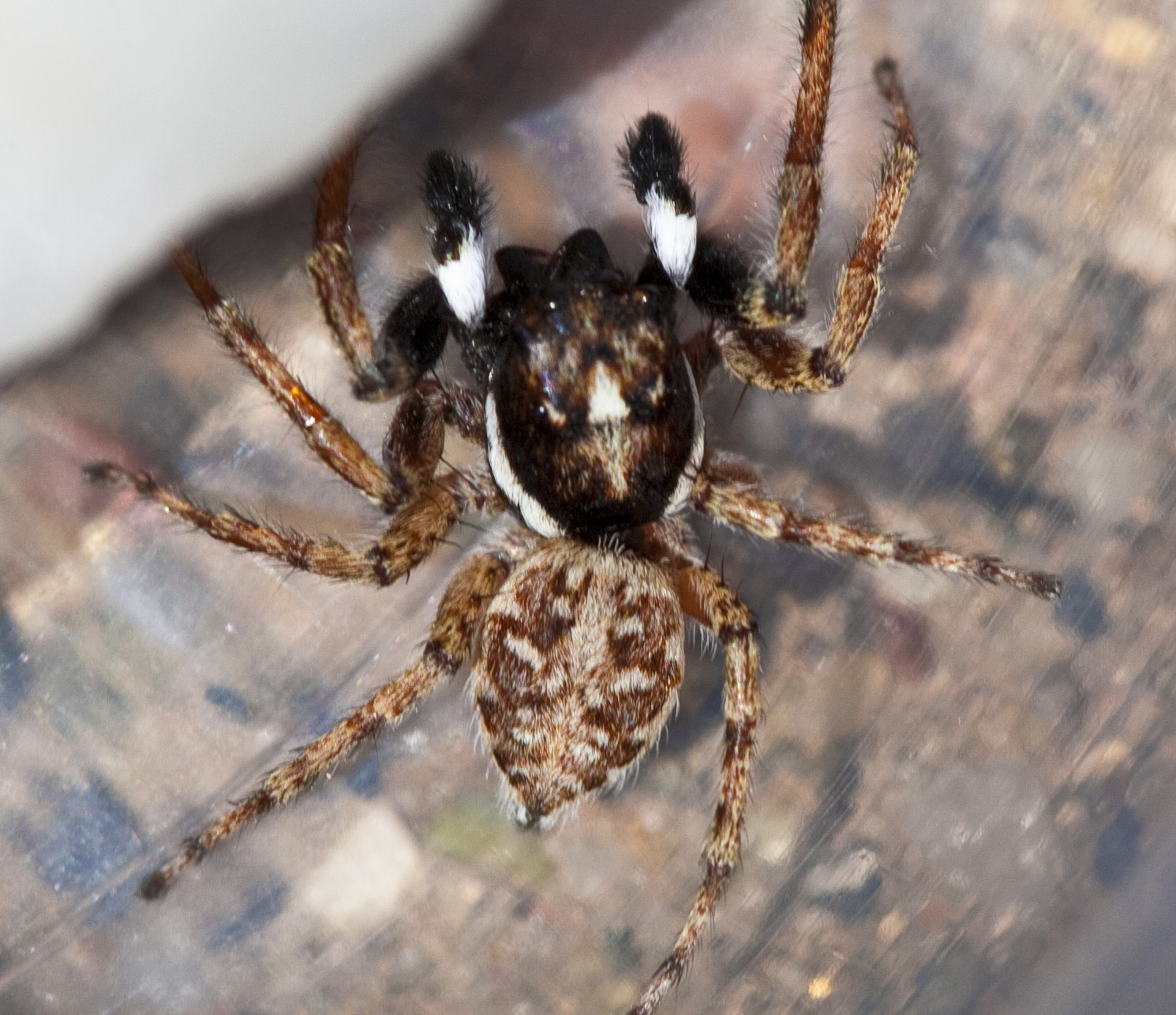
- The related Menemerus semilimbatus

Scientific classification
- Kingdom: Animalia
- Phylum: Arthropoda
- Subphylum: Chelicerata
- Class: Arachnida
- Order: Araneae
- Infraorder: Araneomorphae
- Family: Salticidae
- Genus: Menemerus
- Species: M. pulcher

Binomial name
- Menemerus pulcher Wesołowska, 1999

= Menemerus pulcher =

Species of spider

Menemerus pulcher is a species of jumping spider in the genus Menemerus that lives in Mauretania. The species was first described in 1999 by Wanda Wesołowska. The spider is small and brown, with an atypically high carapace that is 2.6 millimetres (0.10 in) long and an abdomen 2.8 millimetres (0.11 in) long. There is a white stripe running down the back of the otherwise brown carapace. The abdomen is yellowish-fawn with a dark pattern that is reminiscent of a fleur-de-lis and more rounded than other spiders in the genus. Otherwise, it is externally similar to Menemerus plenus, although it can be distinguished by its copulatory organs. The male has a double embolus and two large parallel retrolateral apophyses, or appendages. The female has not been described.

== Taxonomy ==
Menemerus pulcher is a species of jumping spider that was first described by Wanda Wesołowska in 1999. It was one of over 500 species identified by the Polish scientist during her career, the most prolific describer in modern arachnology. She allocated the spider to the genus Menemerus. The genus was first circumscribed in 1868 by Eugène Simon and contains over 60 species. The genus name derives from two Greek words, meaning certainly and diurnal. The genus shares some characteristics with the genera Hypaeus and Pellenes.

Genetic analysis has shown that the genus Menemerus is related to the genera Helvetia and Phintella. It was placed in the tribe Heliophaninae, which was reconstituted as Chrysillini by Wayne Maddison in 2015. The tribe is ubiquitous across most continents of the world. It is allocated to the subclade Saltafresia in the clade Salticoida. In 2016, Jerzy Prószyński created a group of genera named Menemerines after the genus. The vast majority of the species in Menemerines are members of the genus, with additional examples from Kima and Leptorchestes. The species name derives from the Latin for beautiful, pulcher.

== Description ==
Menemerus pulcher is a small spider. The male has a very high carapace that is typically 2.6 mm (0.10 in) long and 2.0 mm (0.08 in) wide. It is dark brown, covered with dense white hairs, with narrow white stripes formed of white hairs down its back. The black eye field has brown bristles near the eyes. The underside, or sternum, is orange-yellow. The face, or clypeus, is also covered in white hairs. The mouthparts are distinctive. The chelicerae are brown and the maxilae and labium are orange-yellow. The abdomen is typically 2.8 mm (0.11 in) long and 2.2 mm (0.09 in) wide. It is more rounded than other species in the genus. The top is yellowish-fawn. It has a distinctive pattern including a russet stripe and dark shapes that look a bit like a fleur-de-lys overlaid on a bell and wavy lines. It is covered in greyish and brown hairs. The underside is yellow. The spinnerets are brown. The front legs are dark brown, the second orange and the remainder yellow. They all have brown hairs and spines. The pedipalps are brown. The spider has distinctive copulatory organs. The double embolus is small. It is hard to distinguish between its two parts, the conductor and the distal lamella. The palpal bulb has a distinctive arrangement of three tibial appendages, or apophyses. Two are large and run parallel near the top of the tibia. The other is very small. There is a large lump at the bottom of the palpal femur. The female has not been described.

Spiders of the Menemerus genus are difficult to distinguish. This species is very similar to Menemerus plenus, particularly in its external appearance. Both are unusual in the genus in having a high carapace. The copulatory organs, however, are distinctive, particularly the existence of the two large parallel retrolateral apophyses.

== Distribution ==
Menemerus spiders are found throughout Africa and Asia, and have been identified as far as Latin America. Menemerus pulcher is endemic to Mauritania. The male holotype was found 31 km (19 mi) south of Nouakchott in 1994. It has only been found on the west of the country.
