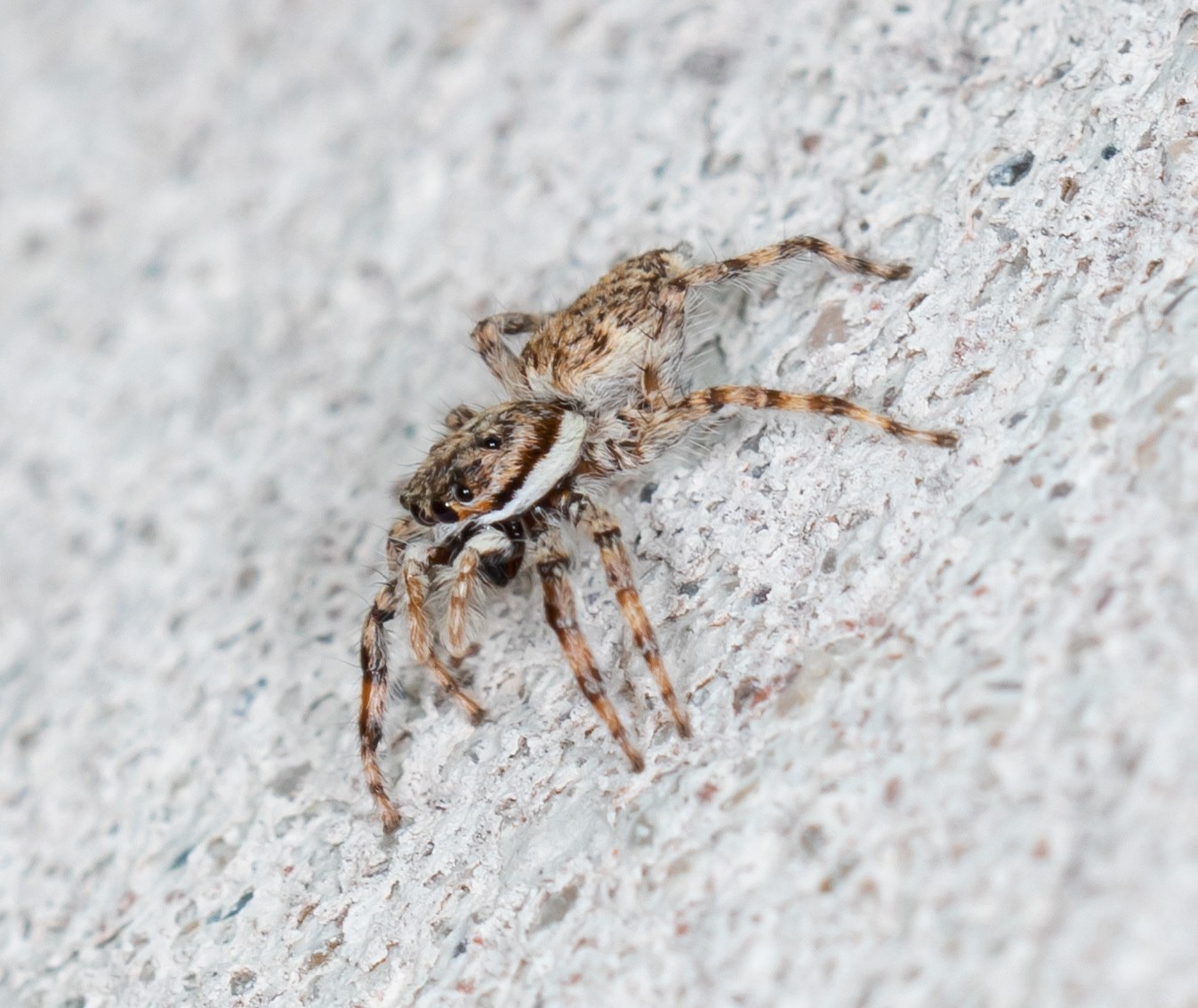
- The related Menemerus nigli on a ruin in Thailand

Scientific classification
- Kingdom: Animalia
- Phylum: Arthropoda
- Subphylum: Chelicerata
- Class: Arachnida
- Order: Araneae
- Infraorder: Araneomorphae
- Family: Salticidae
- Genus: Menemerus
- Species: M. davidi

Binomial name
- Menemerus davidi Prószyński & Wesołowska, 1999

= Menemerus davidi =

Species of spider

Menemerus davidi is a species of jumping spider in the genus Menemerus that lives in North Africa and the Middle East. The species was first identified in 1999 by Jerzy Prószyński and Wanda Wesołowska working initially independently, and then together. The first description was published by Wesołowska, one of over 500 descriptions she produced during her lifetime. The spider is small, with a carapace that ranges between 2.3 and 3.0 millimetres (0.091 and 0.118 in) long and an abdomen that is 2.2 and 3.2 millimetres (0.087 and 0.126 in) long, although the female is larger than the male. The carapace is generally a uniform dark brown while the abdomen has a pattern of a light brown stripe and white patches that serves to distinguish it from the related Menemerus animatus. Otherwise, it is its copulatory organs that most distinguish the species from others in the genus. It has distinctive internal structure to the female epigyne. The wide copulatory openings lead down the centre of the spider to the spermathecae while there is also a short narrower channel that runs to the rear of the spider with a prominent scent pore at the end. The male has a noticeably smaller embolus and a distinctive dorsal tibial apophysis.

== Taxonomy ==
Menemerus davidi is a species of jumping spider that was first described by Jerzy Prószyński and Wanda Wesołowska in 1999. It was one of over 500 species identified by the Polish arachnologist Wesołowska during her career, making her one of the most prolific in the field. She and Prószyński studied the species simultaneously and decided to describe its together, although Wesołowska's description was published first. They allocated the spider to the genus Menemerus. The genus was first described in 1868 by Eugène Simon and contains over 60 species. The genus name derives from two Greek words, meaning certainly and diurnal. The genus shares some characteristics, including having narrow, oval, fixed embolus, with the genera Hypaeus and Pellenes.

Genetic analysis has shown that the genus is related to the genera Helvetia and Phintella. Previously placed in the tribe Heliophaninae, the tribe was reconstituted as Chrysillini. By Wayne Maddison in 2015, The tribe is ubiquitous across most continents of the world. it is allocated to the subclade Saltafresia in the clade Salticoida. In 2016, Prószyński created a group of genera named Menemerines after the genus. The vast majority of the species in Menemerines are members of the genus, with additional examples from Kima and Leptorchestes. The species name is derived from that of the King of Israel, David.

== Description ==
Menemerus davidi is a small spider. The male has a carapace that is between 2.3 and 2.7 millimetres (0.091 and 0.106 in) long and is typically 1.9 millimetres (0.075 in). It is almost completely dark brown with a top covered in almost invisible small hairs apart from a triangle-shaped small patch of white on the otherwise slightly darker eye field. The sides are hairless. The spider has dark brown chelicerae. It has an orange-brown labium and maxilae. The sternum is orange-yellowish. The spider's abdomen is between 2.2 and 2.9 mm (0.087 and 0.114 in) long and typically 1.8 mm (0.071 in) wide. It is light, yellowish with a pattern of a narrow light brown strip down the middle and silver patches on the remainder of the top. In some examples, the abdomen is brownish. The underside is light yellow. It has orange spinnerets and legs. The legs are covered in brown hairs. The spider's copulatory organs are distinctive. The pedipalps are light brown with white hairs. The embolus is short with a very small conductor. The ventral tibial apophysis, or spike, is long, tapering and folds back diagonally. The dorsal tibial apophysis is very flat and reminiscent of a plate in shape. It has three lobes on its edges.

The female is larger than the male It is generally similar to the male. The carapace has brown and white hairs that are denser towards the back. It ranges between 2.7 and 3.0 mm (0.11 and 0.12 in) in length and 2.0 and 2.1 mm (0.079 and 0.083 in) in width. The abdomen is light with light hairs long the edges and a scattering of brown hairs on the top. It measures between 2.9 and 3.2 mm (0.11 and 0.13 in) in length and 1.9 and 2.2 mm (0.075 and 0.087 in) in width. The epigyne is a large oval that has very wide pockets joined together towards the back edge of the spider. The copulatory openings, positioned to the sides in the middle, are large and lead down the centre of the spider to the spermathecae. There is also a short narrower channel that runs to the rear of the spider with a prominent scent pore at the end.

Spiders of the Menemerus genus are difficult to distinguish. This species is particularly similar to the related Menemerus animatus, Menemerus guttatus and Menemerus modestus. The internal structure of the epigyne most differentiates it from Menemerus guttatus. It is most closely related to Menemerus animatus. It can be distinguished from that species by the lack of a white line on the edge of the carapace, a far less distinctive triangular shape on the eye field, the short white hairs on the edge of the clypeus and the different pattern on the abdomen. However, as with the other species, a study of the internal structure of the copulatory organs is often the only way to tell them apart. They differ in the shape of the male dorsal tibial apophysis and shorter embolus and female copulatory openings being rather semi-rounded rather than the thin slits on the other species.

== Distribution ==
Menemerus davidi lives in Israel, Jordan and across North Africa. The holotype was found in Tripolitania, Libya, at an altitude of between 2,200 and 2,400 m (7,200 and 7,900 ft) above sea level in 1948. It was also identified near Djelfa in Algeria. The first example to be found in Egypt was originally misidentified as Menemerus soldani but corrected by Wesołowska in 1999. Examples have also been found in Israel, Jordan and Palestine, including one from Beit Shemesh found in 1957. Some of these have also been misidentified, this time as Menemerus animatus and Menemerus semilimbatus. These were corrected by Prószyński in 2000.
