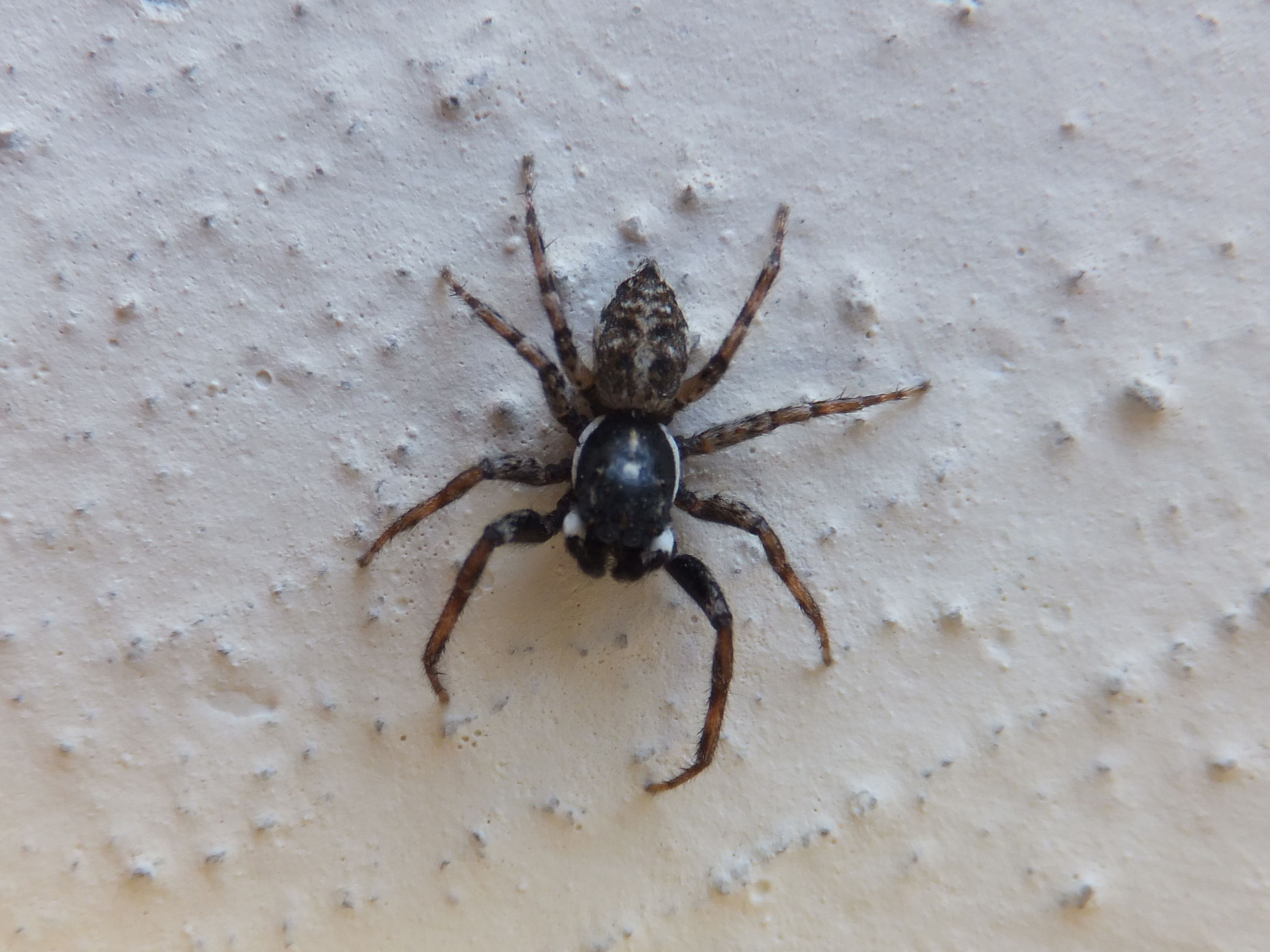
- The related Menemerus semilimbatus

Scientific classification
- Kingdom: Animalia
- Phylum: Arthropoda
- Subphylum: Chelicerata
- Class: Arachnida
- Order: Araneae
- Infraorder: Araneomorphae
- Family: Salticidae
- Genus: Menemerus
- Species: M. guttatus

Binomial name
- Menemerus guttatus Wesołowska, 1999

= Menemerus guttatus =

Species of spider

Menemerus guttatus is a species of jumping spider in the genus Menemerus that lives in Morocco. The spider has been found in the High Atlas mountains in gravel rivers. It displays complex courtship patterns. The species was first described in 1999 by Wanda Wesołowska, one of over 500 descriptions she has made during her lifetime. The spider is small, with a dark brown, nearly black carapace that is between 2.8 and 3.5 millimetres (0.11 and 0.14 in) long and a dark brown abdomen between 2.5 and 5.6 millimetres (0.098 and 0.220 in) long. The female is larger than the male. It can be distinguished from other species in the genus by the pattern on its abdomen, which consists of two lines of white patches that converge to the back of the spider. Otherwise, it is the copulatory organs that most identify the species. The male has a distinctive relatively wide and short embolus and lamella and two similar appendages at the base of the palpal bulb, or apophyses. The female has a complex internal structure of the epigyne including crescent-shaped chambers and circular spermathecae.

== Taxonomy ==
Menemerus guttatus is a species of jumping spider that was first described by Wanda Wesołowska in 1999. It was one of over 500 species identified by the Polish arachnologist during her career, making her one of the most prolific in the field. She allocated the spider to the genus Menemerus. The genus was first described in 1868 by Eugène Simon and contains over 60 species. The genus name derives from two Greek words, meaning certainly and diurnal. The genus shares some characteristics with the genera Hypaeus and Pellenes.

Genetic analysis has shown that the genus Menemerus is related to the genera Helvetia and Phintella. Previously placed in the tribe Heliophaninae, the tribe was reconstituted as Chrysillini by Wayne Maddison in 2015. The tribe is ubiquitous across most continents of the world. it is allocated to the subclade Saltafresia in the clade Salticoida. In 2016, Prószyński created a group of genera named Menemerines after the genus. The vast majority of the species in Menemerines are members of the genus, with additional examples from Kima and Leptorchestes. The species name derives from the Latin for spotted, guttatus.

== Description ==
Menemerus guttatus is a small spider. The male has a carapace that is between 2.8 and 3.1 millimetres (0.11 and 0.12 in) long and an abdomen is between 2.5 and 3.1 millimetres (0.098 and 0.122 in) long. The carapace is dark brown, nearly black, and has a patch formed of white hairs in the middle and two streaks on the sides. The eye field is covered with brown hairs, which are shorter further from the eyes. The spider has a very low brown clypeus and dark brown chelicerae, labium and maxilae. It has a light brown sternum. The spider's abdomen is dark brown on top with an indistinct pattern of light patches that is covered in brownish hairs. The pattern consists of a series of dissimilar patches, some bean-shaped, that form two lines converging to the rear of the spider as a series of stripes becoming chevrons. The underside is yellowish or grey. It has brownish spinnerets and brown legs. The spider's copulatory organs are distinctive. The pedipalps are dark brown. The embolus is relatively wide and short with a lamella that is of a similar length. The palpal bulb has a distinctive arrangement of tibial appendages, or apophyses. They are short and stumpy, with a blunted spike, and face downwards.

The female is larger than the male. It has a carapace that is between 2.8 and 3.5 millimetres (0.11 and 0.14 in) long and an abdomen that is between 3.7 and 5.6 millimetres (0.15 and 0.22 in) long. The carapace is the same as the male and the abdomen has a distinctive pattern that is similar. The legs are darker, particularly the bases of the different segments of the legs. Otherwise, it is similar. The epigyne is large with copulatory openings on its sides and a large pocket in the epigastric furrow. The insemination ducts complex in shape, wide with characteristic curves and parallel crescent-shaped chambers. They lead to circular spermathecae.

Spiders of the Menemerus genus are difficult to distinguish. The abdominal pattern helps to identify the species, but a study of the copulatory organs is needed to confirm it. This species is particularly similar to the related Menemerus animatus, Menemerus davidi, Menemerus modestus and Menemerus soldani. The males can be most distinguished by the arrangement of the embolus and apophyses. For example, the embolus is noticeably shorter than the other species and the two apophyses are closer in shape than those on Menemerus modestus, which is otherwise the closest in design. The internal morphology of the female copulatory organs are also unique.

== Behaviour ==
Due to their good eyesight, Menemerus spiders are mostly diurnal hunters. They attack using a complex approach to their prey and are generally more proactive in comparison to web-spinning spiders. They will eat a wide range of prey and is likely to eat nectar. They undertake complex displays and dances during courtship. The males also undertake aggressive displays between themselves.

== Distribution and habitat ==
Menemerus spiders are found throughout Africa and Asia, and have been identified as far as Latin America. Menemerus guttatus is endemic to Morocco. The male holotype was found near Asni in the High Atlas mountains, at an altitude of 1,300 m (4,300 ft) above sea level in 1977. Other examples, both male and female, have been found nearby. The spider thrives in gravel rivers.
