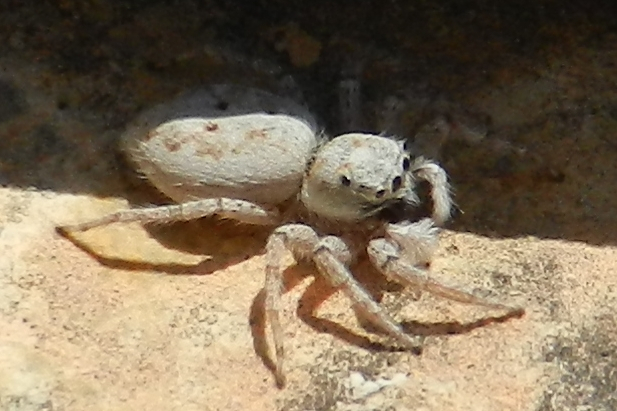
- The related Menemerus fagei

Scientific classification
- Kingdom: Animalia
- Phylum: Arthropoda
- Subphylum: Chelicerata
- Class: Arachnida
- Order: Araneae
- Infraorder: Araneomorphae
- Family: Salticidae
- Genus: Menemerus
- Species: M. affinis

Binomial name
- Menemerus affinis Wesołowska & van Harten, 2010

= Menemerus affinis =

Species of spider

Menemerus affinis is a species of jumping spider in the genus Menemerus that lives in the United Arab Emirates. The spider is externally hard to tell apart from the related Menemerus arabicus or Menemerus fagei; this affinity is reflected in the species name. The spider was first described in 2010 by Wanda Wesołowska and Antonius van Harten based on a holotype discovered in Ras Al Khaimah. Other examples have been found in Dubai. The spider is medium sized with a brown cephalothorax that is between 2.7 and 2.9 mm (0.11 and 0.11 in) long and a greyish-brown abdomen between 3.1 and 4.0 mm (0.12 and 0.16 in) long. It has brown legs. The female is larger than the male and has an epigyne with a large pocket to the front and a notch at the back. The male copulatory organs has an embolus paired to a large secondary conductor and two spikes, or apophyses, on the pedipalp tibia.

== Taxonomy ==
Menemerus affinis is a species of jumping spider that was first described by Wanda Wesołowska and Antonius van Harten in 2010. It is one of over 500 species identified by the Polish arachnologist Wesolowska during her career. They allocated the spider to the genus Menemerus, first circumscribed in 1868 by Eugène Simon, that contains over 60 species. The genus name derives from two Greek words, meaning "certainly" and "diurnal".

Phylogenetic analysis has shown that the genus is related to the genera Helvetia and Phintella. The genus also shares some characteristics with the genera Hypaeus and Pellenes. It is a member of the tribe Heliophaninae, renamed Chrysillini by Wayne Maddison in 2015. Chrysillines are monophyletic. The tribe is ubiquitous across most of the continents of the world. It is allocated to the subclade Saltafresia in the clade Salticoida. In 2016, Jerzy Prószyński created a group of genera named Menemerines after the genus. The vast majority of the species in Menemerines are members of the genus, with additional examples from Kima and Leptorchestes. The species is named for its affinity with related species in the genus.

== Description ==
Menemerus affinis is a medium-sized spider. Its body is divided into two main parts, a cephalothorax and an oval abdomen. The male cephalothorax measures typically 2.9 mm (0.11 in) in length and 2.3 mm (0.09 in) in width with an abdomen typically 3.1 mm (0.12 in) long and 2.0 mm (0.08 in) wide. Males of this species have a carapace that is brown with a line down the middle formed of white hairs. The same hairs cover the darker eye field which is darker. The spider's face, known as the clypeus, brown, as are the mouthparts, consisting of chelicerae, labium and maxilae. The sternum, the underside of the cephalothorax, is also brown. The abdomen primarily greyish-brown and covered with dense long brown and greyish hairs with a wide leaf-like shape in the middle and a darker patch to the front. Its sides and underside are light. The spider's spinnerets are light grey. Its legs are brown, the foremost being darker than the rearmost pair, with dense brown leg hairs. The spider makes sounds using stridulatory apparatus of bristles on the legs and a grater on the chelicerae. A key feature of the male Menemerus affinis is its embolus, part of the reproductive system, which is short and slightly curved towards the palpal bulb. The embolus is paired to a large secondary conductor that accompanies the embolus, which is sclerotized at its base. Its pedipalp, which is brown with white hairs, has a tibia with two spikes, or apophyses. These run next to each other, facing upwards.

The female is larger than the male, with a cephalothorax typically 2.7 mm (0.11 in) in length and 1.8 mm (0.07 in) in width and an abdomen typically 4.0 mm (0.16 in) and 2.4 mm (0.09 in) wide. The female is otherwise similar externally to the male, differing in only a few superficial aspects, such as there being wide white streaks on the side of the carapace. The copulatory organs are again characteristic of the species. The epigyne is wide with a deep notch at the back and a large pocket to the front. There are two depressions to the sides. Internally, the structure is typical for the genus. The copulatory openings are hidden in large cups that have strong sclerotization. The insemination ducts are short and lead to spherical spermathecae. Spiders of the Menemerus genus are difficult to distinguish. Apart from its copulatory organs, Menemerus affinis is particularly hard to tell apart from the related species Menemerus arabicus or Menemerus fagei. The similarity in their size and the design of their bodies makes them easy to confuse.

== Distribution ==
Menemerus spiders are found throughout Africa and Asia, and have been identified as far as Latin America. Menemerus affinis is endemic to the United Arab Emirates. It was first found in the Emirate of Ras Al Khaimah, with the holotype collected in 2008 in Wadi Shawka. Other examples are also found living in the Emirate of Dubai.
