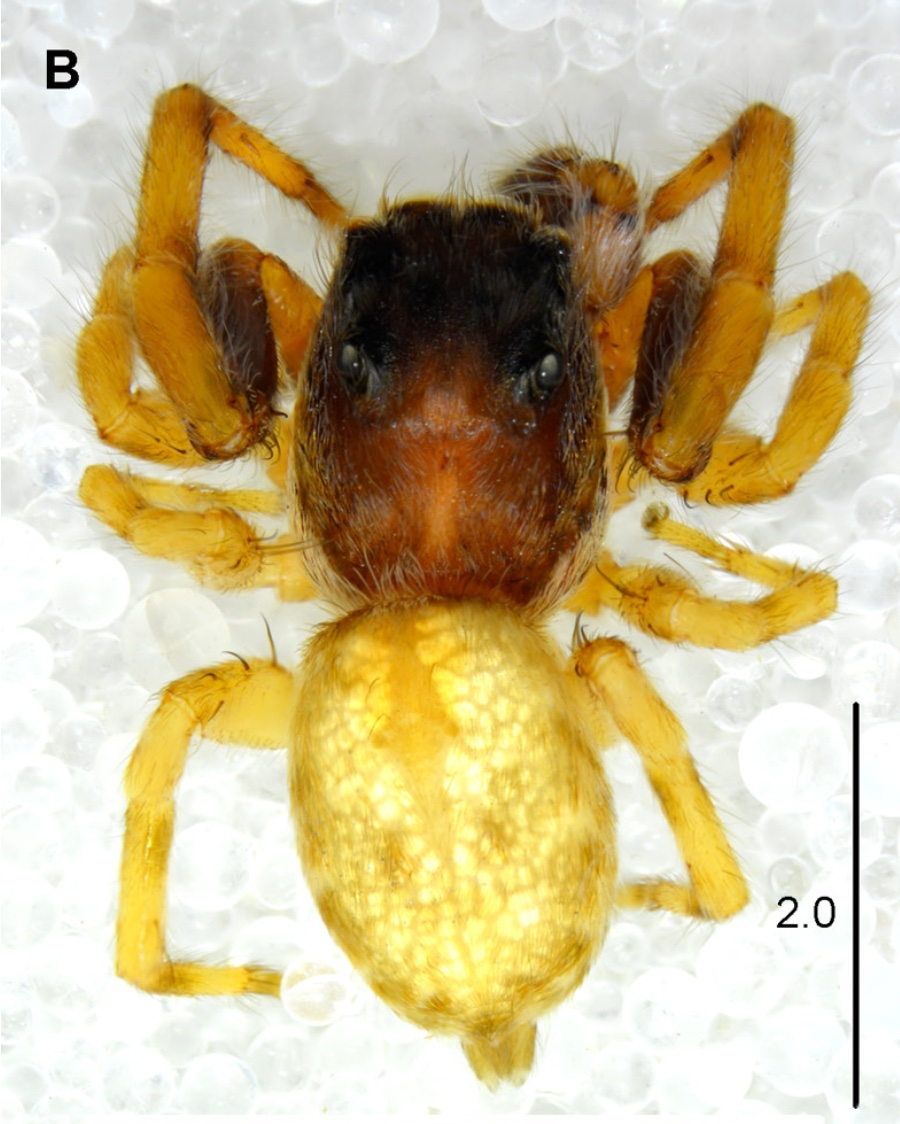
- General appearance of the male

Scientific classification
- Kingdom: Animalia
- Phylum: Arthropoda
- Subphylum: Chelicerata
- Class: Arachnida
- Order: Araneae
- Infraorder: Araneomorphae
- Family: Salticidae
- Genus: Menemerus
- Species: M. tropicus

Binomial name
- Menemerus tropicus Wesołowska, 2007

= Menemerus tropicus =

Species of spider

Menemerus tropicus is a species of jumping spider in the genus Menemerus. The spider lives in savanna in Kenya and Uganda near Lake Victoria. It creates large nest complexes that stretch between trees, with each spider living in its own nest within the complex. A small flat spider, it has a forward section known as a cephalothorax that is between 1.7 and 2.1 mm (0.07 and 0.08 in) and, behind that, a rounded abdomen between 1.7 and 2.9 mm (0.07 and 0.11 in) long. The female is larger than the male and has a darker abdomen and generally a lighter cephalothorax. The male abdomen has a pattern on the top with a brown streak and silver spots. The female has a yellowish streak, in some examples, with yellow patches. Both have legs that are brown and yellow. Its copulatory organs help distinguish the species from others in the genus. The male has a very short double embolus that projects from the top of its tegulum and a very large appendage on its palpal tibia called a retrolateral apophysis. The female has a narrow pocket in its epigyne, the visible external part of its copulatory organs and narrow insemination ducts that end in small spherical receptacles called spermathecae. The species was first described in 2007 by the Polish arachnologist Wanda Wesołowska, one of over 500 descriptions she has written during her lifetime.

== Taxonomy ==
Menemerus tropicus is a species of jumping spider, a member of the family Salticidae, that was first described by Wanda Wesołowska in 2007. It was one of over 500 species identified by the Polish arachnologist during her career, making her one of the most prolific experts in the field. She allocated the spider to the genus Menemerus, first circumscribed in 1868 by Eugène Simon, which contains over 60 species. The genus name derives from two Greek words, meaning certainly and diurnal. The genus shares some characteristics with the genera Hypaeus and Pellenes.

Genetic analysis has shown that the genus is related to the genera Helvetia and Phintella. The genus was placed in the tribe Heliophaninae, which was renamed Chrysillini by Wayne Maddison in 2015. The tribe is ubiquitous across most of the continents of the world. It is allocated to the subclade Saltafresia in the clade Salticoida. Chrysillines are monophyletic. In 2016, Prószyński created a group of genera named Menemerines after the genus. The vast majority of the species in Menemerines are members of the genus, with additional examples from Kima and Leptorchestes. The species name recalls the tropical climate where the spider lives.

== Description ==
Menemerus tropicus is a small spider with a body composed of a low flat cephalothorax and a rounded flat abdomen. The male has a cephalothorax that is between 1.7 and 2.0 mm (0.07 and 0.08 in) long and between 1.3 and 1.6 mm (0.05 and 0.06 in) wide. Its carapace, the hard upper part of the cephalothorax, is dark brown, covered in dense brown and grey hairs. A band formed of white hairs lines the sides of the carapace. It has a darker eye field, almost black with long brown bristles near the eyes themselves. The underside of the cephalothorax, or sternum, is brown. The spider has a low dark clypeus that features a scattering of grey hairs. Its mouthparts, including its chelicerae, labium and maxilae, are brown.

Its abdomen is between 1.7 and 2.2 mm (0.07 and 0.09 in) long and between 1.4 and 1.7 mm (0.06 and 0.07 in) wide. On its upper surface, it has a pattern consisting of an irregular brown streak down the middle, scattered with silver spots, and brown patches on the sides. It is covered in dense brown and grey hairs like the carapace, which are longer to the edges. The underside of its abdomen is greyish. It has beige spinnerets that it uses to spin webs. The front legs are brown, the remainder yellow with brown patches, all with brown spines and hairs. Its pedipalps, the male copulatory organs are a brownish color. Its cymbium, the outer protective organ, is a darker color. Alongside the cymbium lies an elongated palpal bulb that consists of a tegulum that has an appendage known as a tegular apophysis that curves with it into the bulb. The tegulum has a very short double embolus emanating from it. There are also two appendages, or apophyses, on the palpal tibia. Its retrolateral apophysis is large and bulbous and contrasts with its ventral apophysis, which is very small and spiky.

The female is larger than the male. It has a cephalothorax that is between 2.0 and 2.1 mm (0.08 and 0.08 in) long and 1.5 and 1.6 mm (0.06 and 0.06 in) wide and an abdomen that is between 2.4 and 2.9 mm (0.09 and 0.11 in) long and 1.8 and 2.2 mm (0.07 and 0.09 in) wide. It is generally similar to the male but clothed with dark hairs rather than grey and brown hairs. Its carapace is lighter but its abdomen is darker. Its abdomen also has a distinctive pattern on the top with a yellowish streak down the middle that, in some examples, is complemented by two lines of yellow patches. The bottom of its abdomen is dark grey. The female's mouthparts are generally similar to the male, and its labium and maxillae differ in having pale yellow chewing margins. Its spinnerets are darker than the male while its legs and pedipalps are all yellow with brown patches. The spider's epigyne, the external visible part of the female's copulatory organs, has a large central depression, sometimes partially plugged by wax, and a notch on the very rear. It has two copulatory ducts that lead to narrow insemination ducts, with long accessory glands leading to the end of the ducts, and small spherical spermathecae, or receptacles, where they end.

Spiders of the Menemerus genus are difficult to distinguish as they superficially look very similar. A study of its copulatory organs enables the species to be identified. The female is similar to the related Menemerus paradoxus, but has a narrower pocket in its epigyne and smaller spermathecae. The male has similarities to Menemerus meridionalis but differs in having a larger retrolateral apophysis.

== Behaviour ==
Like many jumping spiders, Menemerus spiders do not spin webs to capture prey. Instead, they are mainly diurnal hunters that use their good eyesight to spot their prey. They will eat a wide range of prey and show a preference for eating ants rather than flies. The spiders transmit vibratory signals through silk to communicate to other spiders and use visual displays during courtship. Male Menemerus tropicus spiders will undertake a zigzag dance and quiver their pedipalps before the female. They form groups in loose association with each other. They are hesitant attacking other spiders but the males undertake aggressive displays between themselves. They are also known to embrace, usually holding on for between 1 and 5 seconds.

== Distribution and habitat ==
Menemerus spiders are found throughout Africa and Asia and have been identified as far as Latin America. Menemerus tropicus is found in Kenya and Uganda. The male holotype was found at Mbita Point, Kenya, on the side of Lake Victoria at an altitude of 1,150 m (3,770 ft) above sea level in 2001. It has subsequently been found in Homa Bay and Nakuru. The first examples found in Uganda were discovered in 1996 in Entebbe, also on the lake. Others specimens have subsequently been seen in the same area.

The species lives in Cambretaceous savanna near freshwater. The spider lives in large nest complexes that contain many different species. Sometimes, the spiders will create webs that stretch between different plants to create very large complexes. Each spider has its own nest within the complex, generally spaced between 5 and 15 mm (0.20 and 0.59 in), but also occasionally touching.
