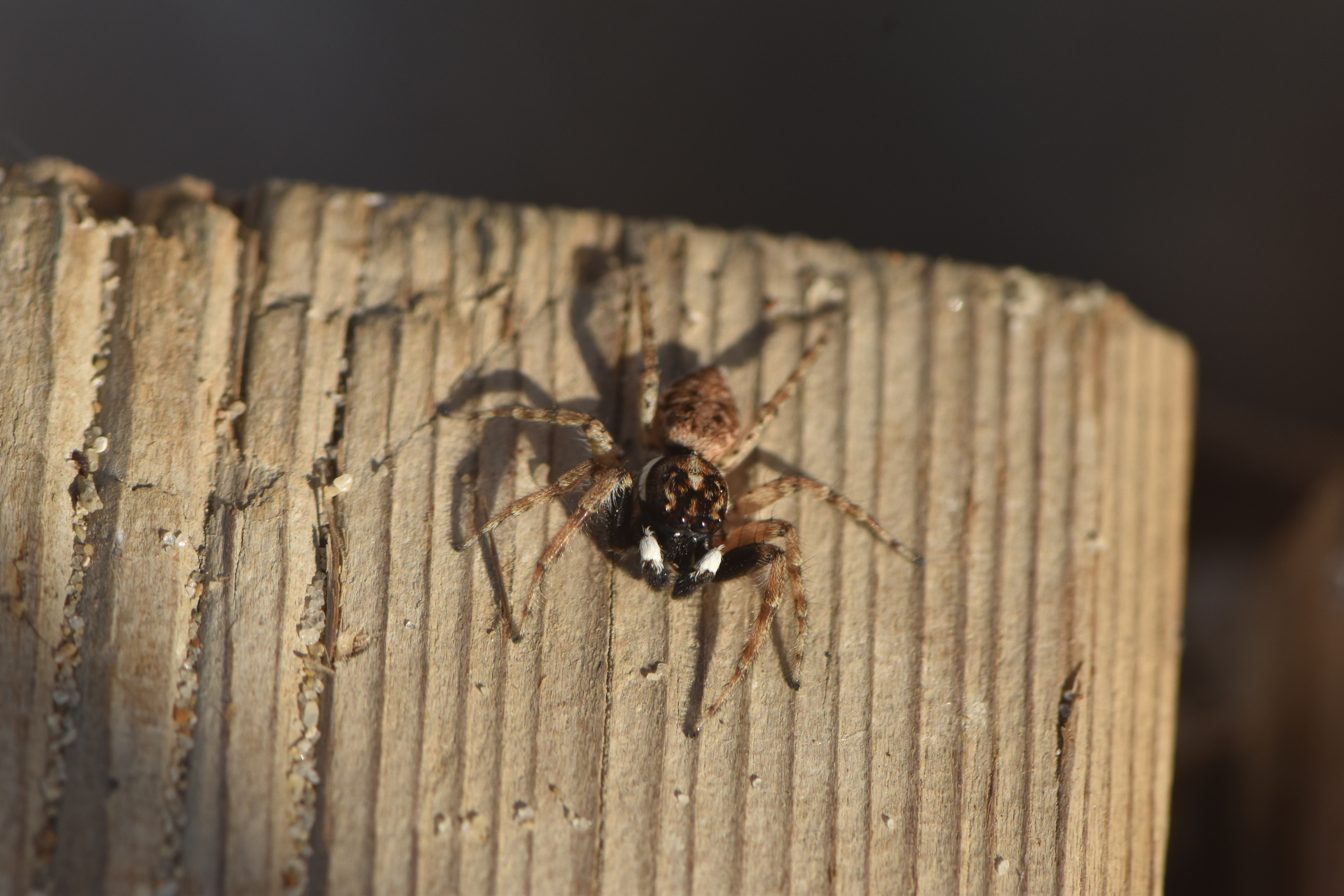
- The related Menemerus semilimbatus

Scientific classification
- Kingdom: Animalia
- Phylum: Arthropoda
- Subphylum: Chelicerata
- Class: Arachnida
- Order: Araneae
- Infraorder: Araneomorphae
- Family: Salticidae
- Genus: Menemerus
- Species: M. meridionalis

Binomial name
- Menemerus meridionalis Wesołowska, 1999

= Menemerus meridionalis =

Species of spider

Menemerus meridionalis is a species of jumping spider in the genus Menemerus that lives in South Africa. The species was first described in 1999 by Wanda Wesołowska, one of over 500 descriptions she produced during her lifetime. The spider is small, with a carapace that is typically 2.8 millimetres (0.11 in) long and an abdomen 3.3 millimetres (0.13 in) long. The carapace is generally dark brown with a white stripe down the middle while the abdomen has a dark brown stripe. Otherwise, it is its copulatory organs that most distinguish the species from others in the genus. The male has a lumpy retrolateral tibial apophysis, similar to but smaller than Menemerus tropicus, and a very small spiked ventral tibial apophysis.

== Taxonomy ==
Menemerus meridionalis is a species of jumping spider that was first described by Wanda Wesołowska in 1999. It was one of over 500 species identified by the Polish arachnologist during her career, making her one of the most prolific in the field. She allocated the spider to the genus Menemerus. The genus was first described in 1868 by Eugène Simon and contains over 60 species. The genus name derives from two Greek words, meaning certainly and diurnal.

Genetic analysis has shown that Menemerus is related to the genera Helvetia and Phintella. The genus was placed in the tribe Heliophaninae, but this tribe was reconstituted as Chrysillini by Wayne Maddison in 2015. The tribe is ubiquitous across most continents of the world. Maddison allocated it to the subclade Saltafresia in the clade Salticoida. In 2016, Prószyński created a group of genera named Menemerines after the genus. The vast majority of the species in Menemerines are members of the genus, with additional examples from Kima and Leptorchestes.. The species name derives from the Latin for southern, meridionalis.

== Description ==
Menemerus meridionalis is a small spider. The male has a dark brown flattened carapace that is typically 2.8 millimetres (0.11 in) long and 1.9 millimetres (0.075 in) wide. It has a scattering of white hairs on it and white hairs making up lines on its edges and a stripe down the middle. There are long brown bristles around the nearly black eye field. The spider has brown chelicerae, labium, maxilae and sternum. The spider's abdomen is typically 3.3 mm (0.13 in) long and 1.9 millimetres (0.075 in) wide. It has a wide dark brown stripe down the middle of the top, white hairs on its sides and a wide brownish stripe on its underside. It has brown spinnerets and legs. The spider's copulatory organs are distinctive. The pedipalp is light brown and covered in white hairs. It has a large palpal tibia. The spider has what looks like two embolus, with a lamella of nearly the same size closely matching the actual embolus. It also has a lumpy retrolateral tibial apophysis and very small spiked ventral tibial apophysis. The female has not been described.

Spiders of the Menemerus genus are difficult to distinguish from each other. It is the copulatory organs of this species that are distinctive and enable it to be identified. The male's palpal bulb resembles Menemerus tropicus but the retrolateral tibial apophysis is smaller.

== Distribution ==
Menemerus spiders are found throughout Africa and Asia, and have been identified as far as Latin America. Menemerus meridionalis is endemic to South Africa. The holotype and other examples were found near Mogwadi in Limpopo during 1967. It is only known from that area of the country.
