= Hypaeus poseidon =

Scientific classification
- Kingdom: Animalia
- Phylum: Arthropoda
- Subphylum: Chelicerata
- Class: Arachnida
- Order: Araneae
- Infraorder: Araneomorphae
- Family: Salticidae
- Genus: Hypaeus
- Species: H. poseidon

Binomial name
- Hypaeus poseidon Araújo & Ruiz, 2015

Species of spider

Hypaeus poseidon is a species of jumping spider from the Brazilian Amazon, specifically São Félix do Xingu, Pará.
