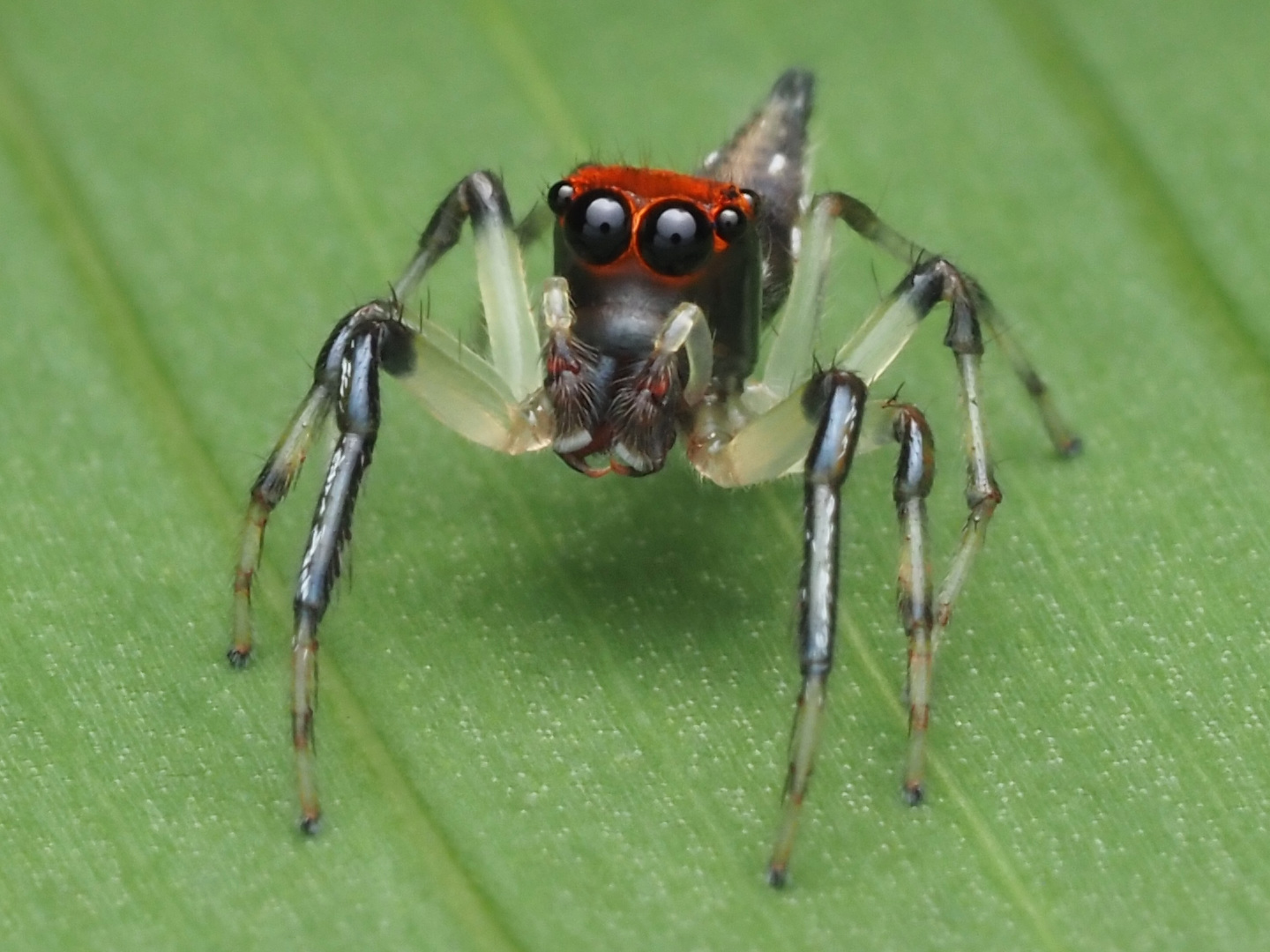
- Male
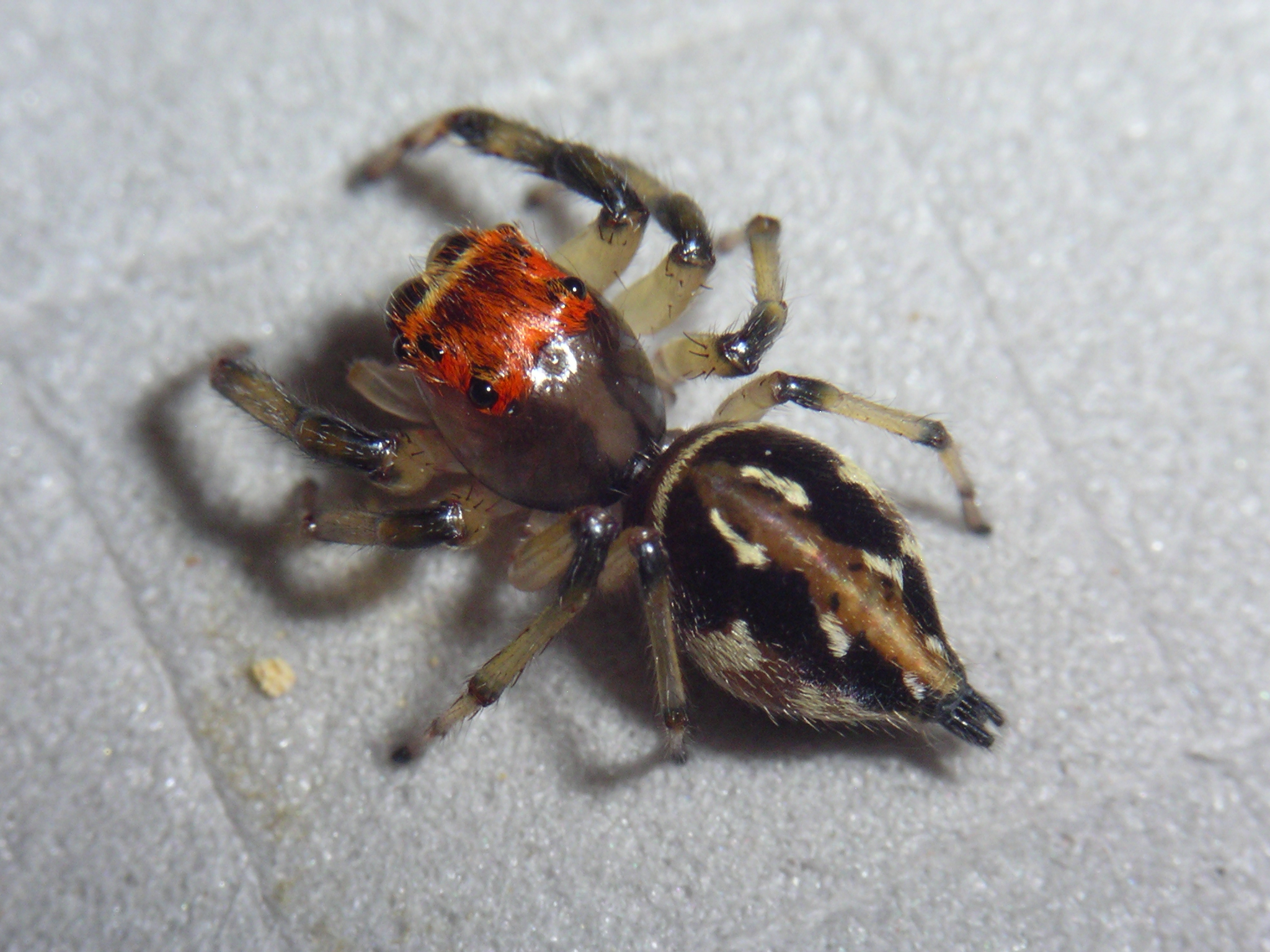
- Female

Scientific classification
- Kingdom: Animalia
- Phylum: Arthropoda
- Subphylum: Chelicerata
- Class: Arachnida
- Order: Araneae
- Infraorder: Araneomorphae
- Family: Salticidae
- Genus: Hypaeus
- Species: H. benignus

Binomial name
- Hypaeus benignus (G. W. Peckham & E. G. Peckham, 1885)

= Hypaeus benignus =

Species of jumping spider

Hypaeus benignus is a species of jumping spiders in the genus Hypaeus that was first discovered in Guatamala.
