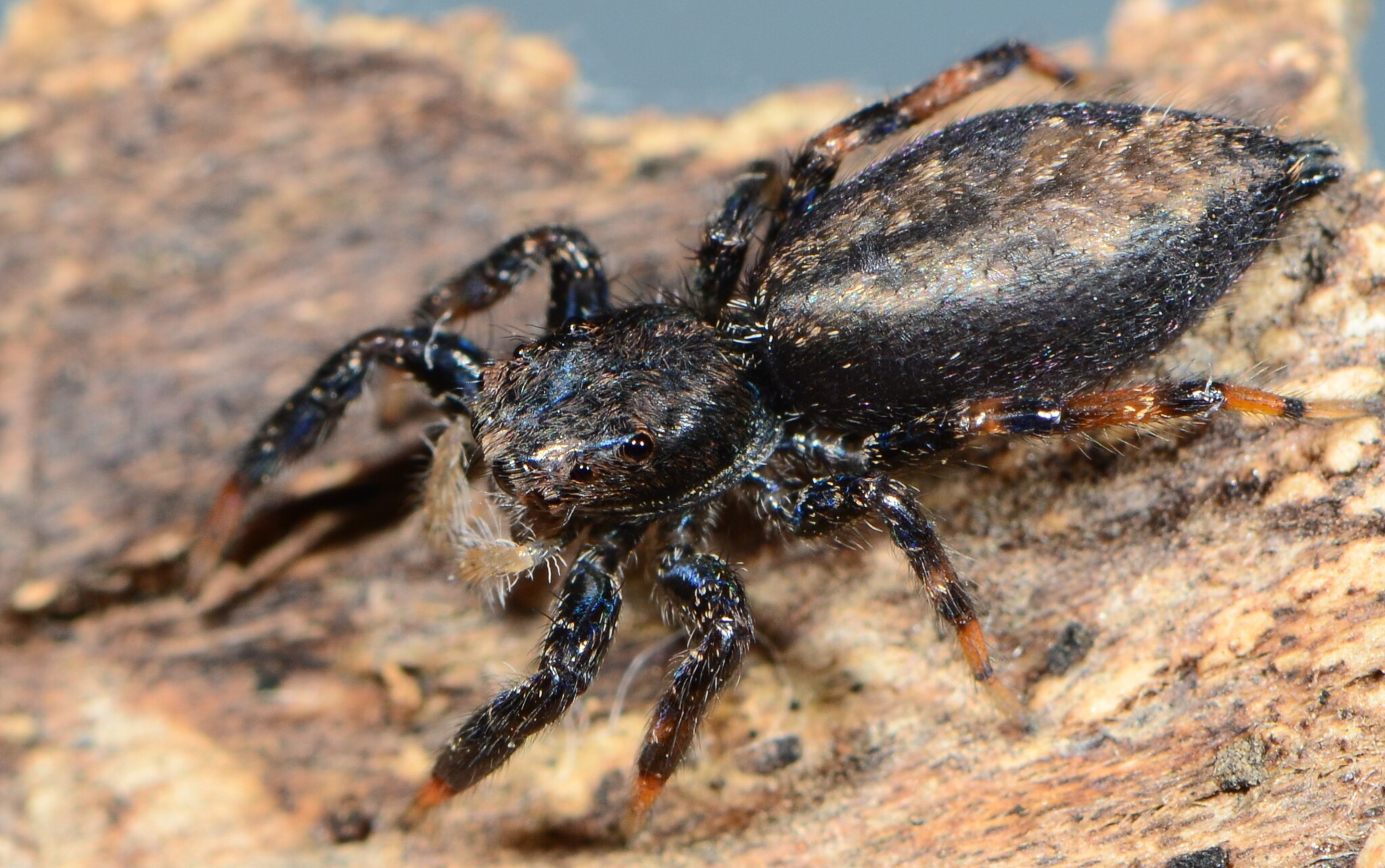
- female
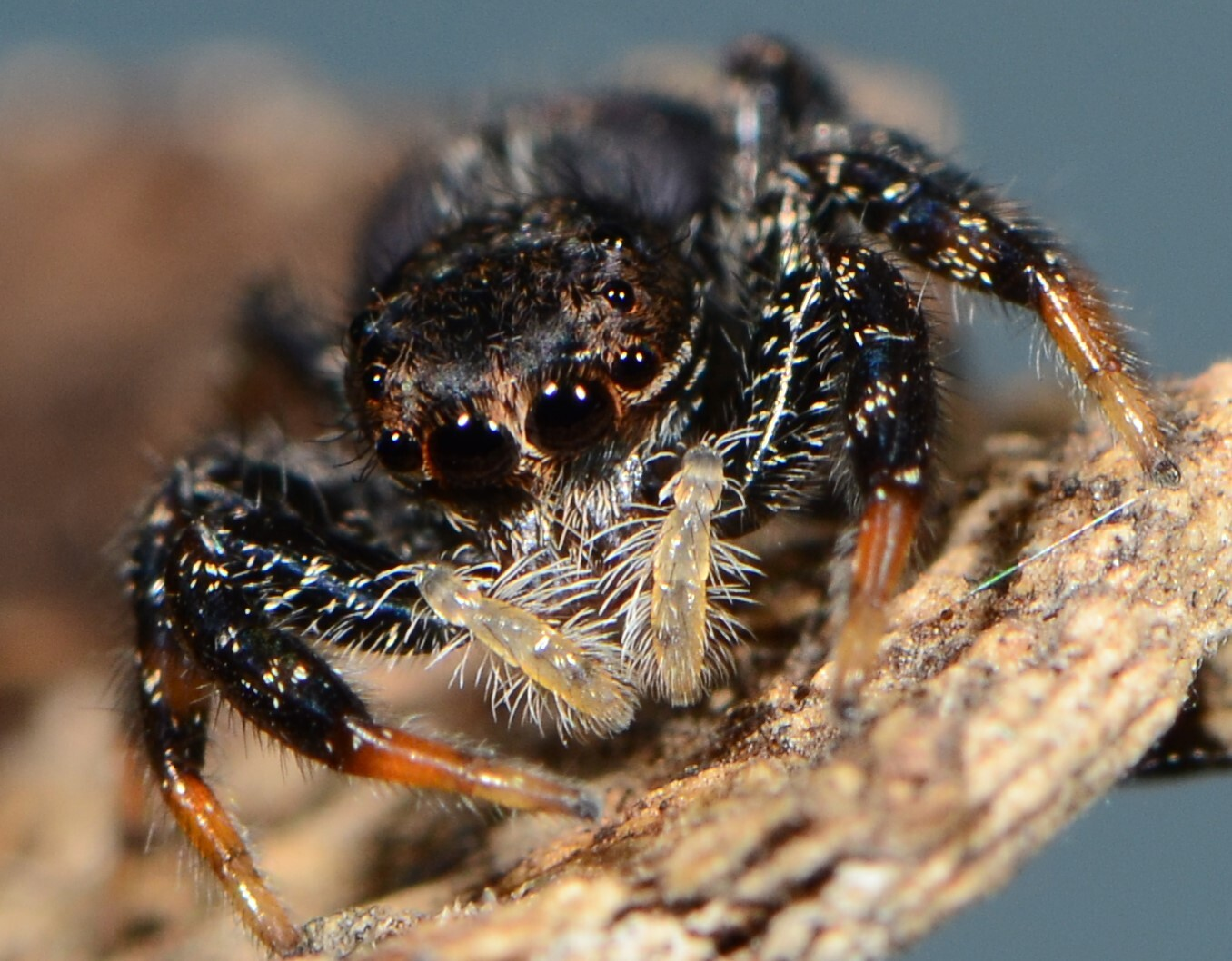
- female

Scientific classification
- Kingdom: Animalia
- Phylum: Arthropoda
- Subphylum: Chelicerata
- Class: Arachnida
- Order: Araneae
- Infraorder: Araneomorphae
- Family: Salticidae
- Genus: Menemerus
- Species: M. fagei

Binomial name
- Menemerus fagei Berland & Millot, 1941

= Menemerus fagei =

Species of spider

Menemerus fagei is a species of jumping spider in the family Salticidae. It is found in West Africa, Malta, Egypt, Sudan, Ethiopia, Djibouti, Yemen, and Israel and was first described by Berland & Millot in 1941. It is named for the French zoologist Louis Fage, and so should be pronounced /ˈfɑːʒiː/.
