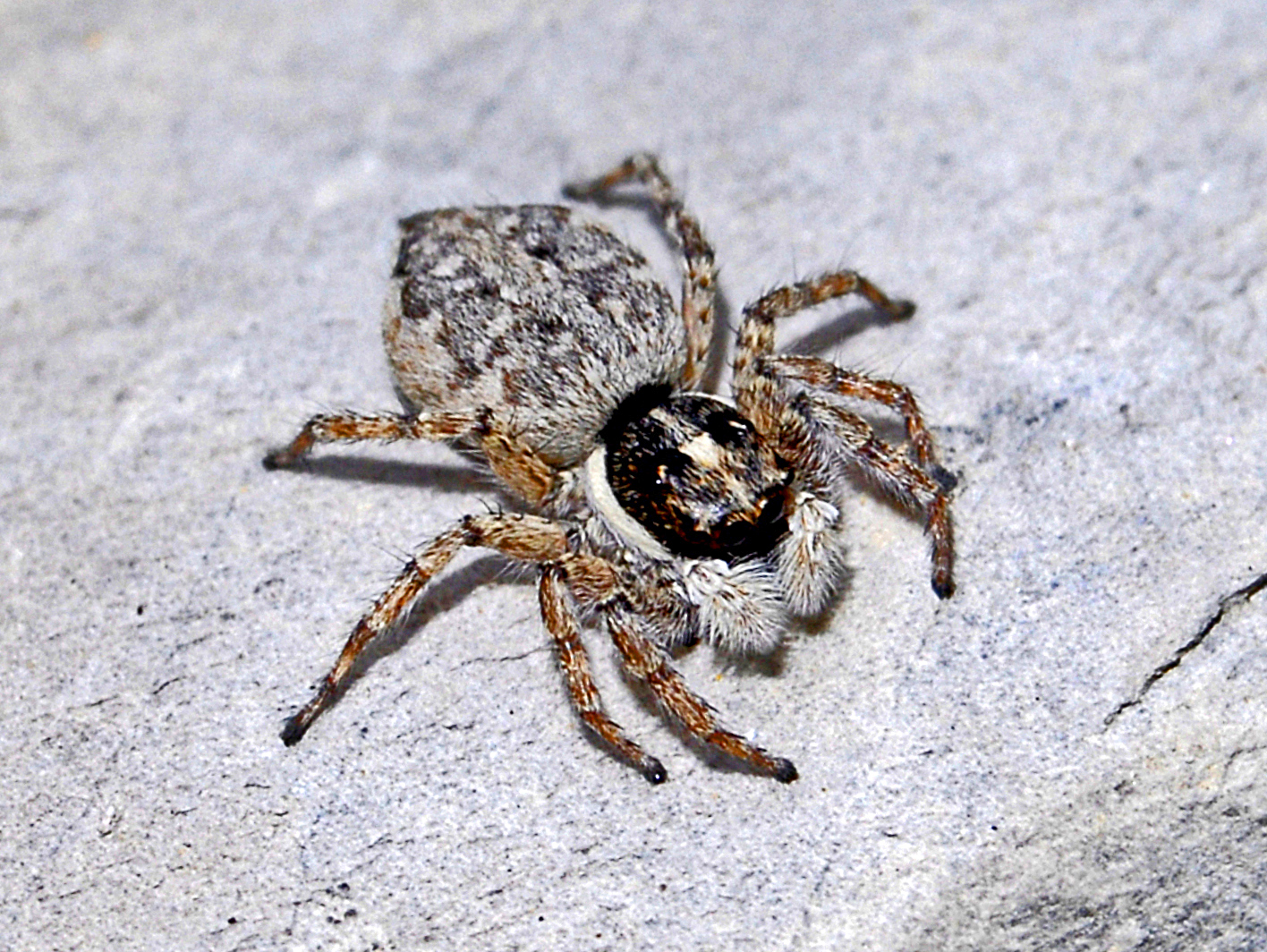
- M. semilimbatus from Italy

Scientific classification
- Kingdom: Animalia
- Phylum: Arthropoda
- Subphylum: Chelicerata
- Class: Arachnida
- Order: Araneae
- Infraorder: Araneomorphae
- Family: Salticidae
- Genus: Menemerus
- Species: M. semilimbatus

Binomial name
- Menemerus semilimbatus Hahn, 1829

Synonyms
- Salticus intentus Blackwall, 1870; Menemerus heydenii Simon, 1868; Menemerus vigoratus Simon, 1868; Salticus mauritanicus Lucas, 1846; Euophrys vigorata Koch C.L., 1846; Attus agilis Walckenaer, 1841; Attus semilimbatus Hahn, 1827

= Menemerus semilimbatus =

Half-edged Wall Jumping Spider

Species of spider

Menemerus semilimbatus is a spider in the family Salticidae.

== Description ==
female

male

Menemerus semilimbatus are about 6.5–8.4 millimetres (0.26–0.33 in) long, the male being slightly smaller than the female. These fairly big jumping spiders are dorso-ventrally flattened and are covered with short dense, grayish-white hairs, with hairy whitish palps and a white band on the side margins of the carapace, showing also a small white, triangular marking in the middle. The eyes are large and forward-facing. The legs are light brown with darker rings and patches, while the abdomen is dorsally yellowish or grayish, with a characteristic pattern of several bright V-shaped markings. The females show a notch at the posterior edge of the epigyne and two oval depressions in the anterior half.

== Distribution ==
Menemerus semilimbatus is a Mediterranean species widely distributed in Europe, southern Asia and in Africa. In the Americas, it has been reported in Argentina, Chile, Ecuador and USA.

== Habitat ==
These spiders are synanthropic living in gardens and inside and on the outside of houses. It is usually found on the walls of buildings where it stalks its prey.
