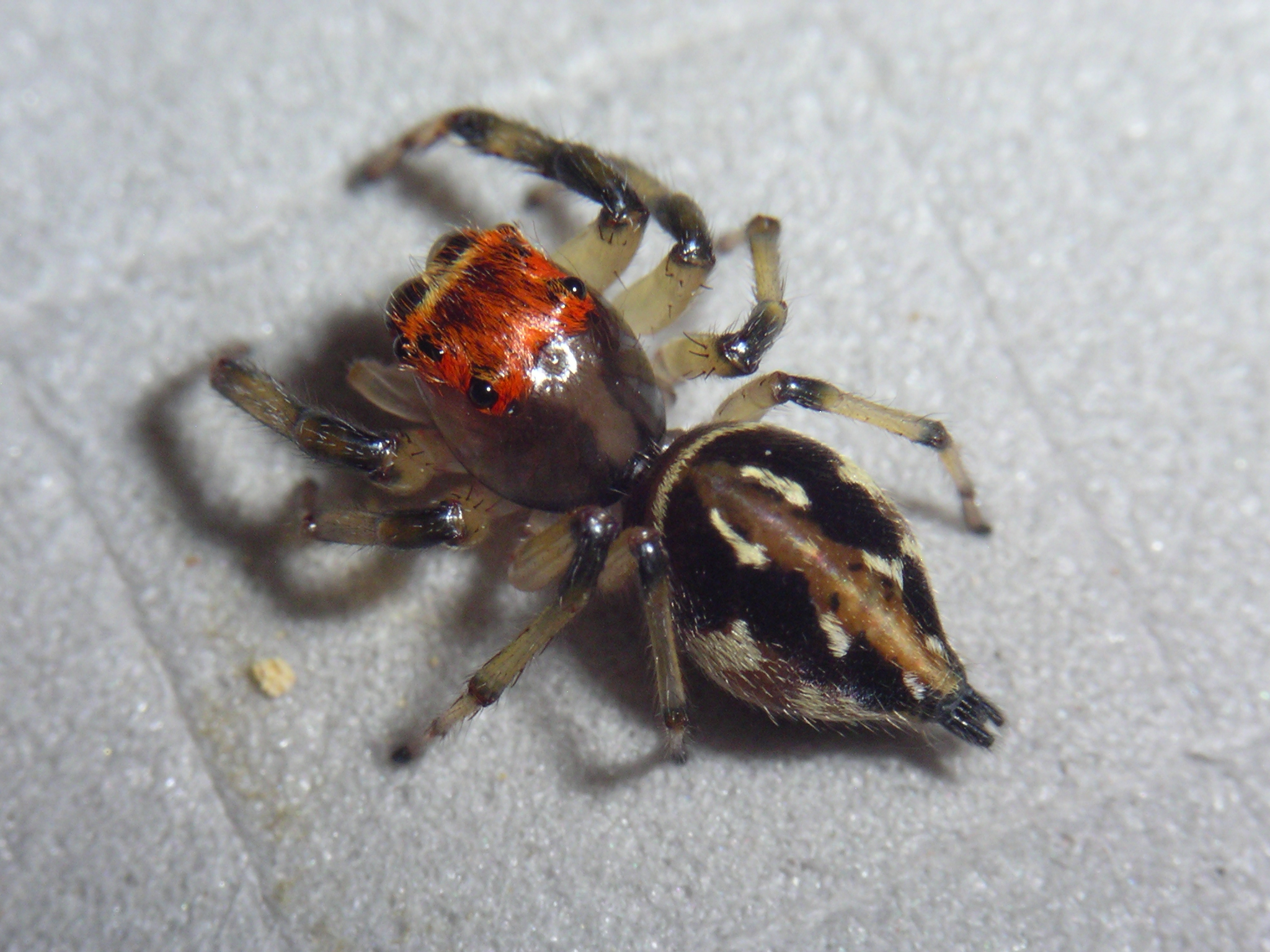
- Female Hypaeus benignus in Mexico

Scientific classification
- Kingdom: Animalia
- Phylum: Arthropoda
- Subphylum: Chelicerata
- Class: Arachnida
- Order: Araneae
- Infraorder: Araneomorphae
- Family: Salticidae
- Subfamily: Salticinae
- Genus: Hypaeus; Simon, 1900

Type species
- Attus porcatus Taczanowski, 1871

Species
- see text

= Hypaeus =

Genus of spiders

Hypaeus is a South American genus of the spider family Salticidae (jumping spiders).

== Species ==
As of December 2025, this genus includes 29 species:

- Hypaeus annulifer Simon, 1900 – Brazil
- Hypaeus arhuaco Martínez & Galvis, 2017 – Colombia
- Hypaeus barromachadoi Caporiacco, 1947 – Guyana
- Hypaeus benignus (G. W. Peckham & E. G. Peckham, 1885) – Mexico to Panama
- Hypaeus concinnus Simon, 1900 – Brazil
- Hypaeus cucullatus Simon, 1900 – Ecuador
- Hypaeus duodentatus Crane, 1943 – Guyana
- Hypaeus estebanensis Simon, 1900 – Venezuela
- Hypaeus femoratus Araújo & Ruiz, 2015 – Brazil
- Hypaeus flavipes Simon, 1900 – Brazil
- Hypaeus flemingi Crane, 1943 – Venezuela, Brazil
- Hypaeus frontosus Simon, 1900 – Brazil
- Hypaeus ignicomus Simon, 1900 – Brazil
- Hypaeus luridomaculatus Simon, 1900 – Brazil
- Hypaeus miles Simon, 1900 – Brazil, Guyana, French Guiana
- Hypaeus mystacalis (Taczanowski, 1878) – Ecuador, Peru
- Hypaeus nigrocomosus Simon, 1900 – Brazil
- Hypaeus olympeae Courtial & Picard, 2023 – French Guiana
- Hypaeus pauciaculeis (Caporiacco, 1947) – Guyana
- Hypaeus porcatus (Taczanowski, 1871) – French Guiana
- Hypaeus poseidon Araújo & Ruiz, 2015 – Brazil
- Hypaeus proszynskii Martínez & Galvis, 2017 – Colombia
- Hypaeus quadrinotatus Simon, 1900 – Brazil
- Hypaeus taczanowskii (Mello-Leitão, 1948) – French Guiana, Guyana, Brazil (type species)
- Hypaeus terraemediae Araújo & Ruiz, 2015 – Brazil
- Hypaeus tridactylus Araújo & Ruiz, 2015 – Brazil
- Hypaeus triplagiatus Simon, 1900 – Brazil, Peru
- Hypaeus varzea Martínez & Galvis, 2017 – Colombia
- Hypaeus venezuelanus Simon, 1900 – Venezuela
