= Helvetia =

National personification of Switzerland

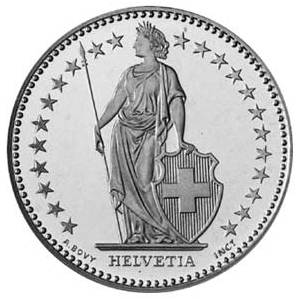
Standing Helvetia on obverse of a Swiss 2-franc coin

Helvetia (/hɛlˈviːʃə/) is a national personification of Switzerland, officially Confoederatio Helvetica, the Swiss Confederation.

The allegory is typically pictured in a flowing clothing, with a spear and a shield emblazoned with the Swiss flag, and commonly with braided hair and a wreath as a symbol of confederation. The name is a derivation of the ethnonym Helvetii, the name of the Gaulish tribe inhabiting the Swiss Plateau before the Roman conquest.

== History ==
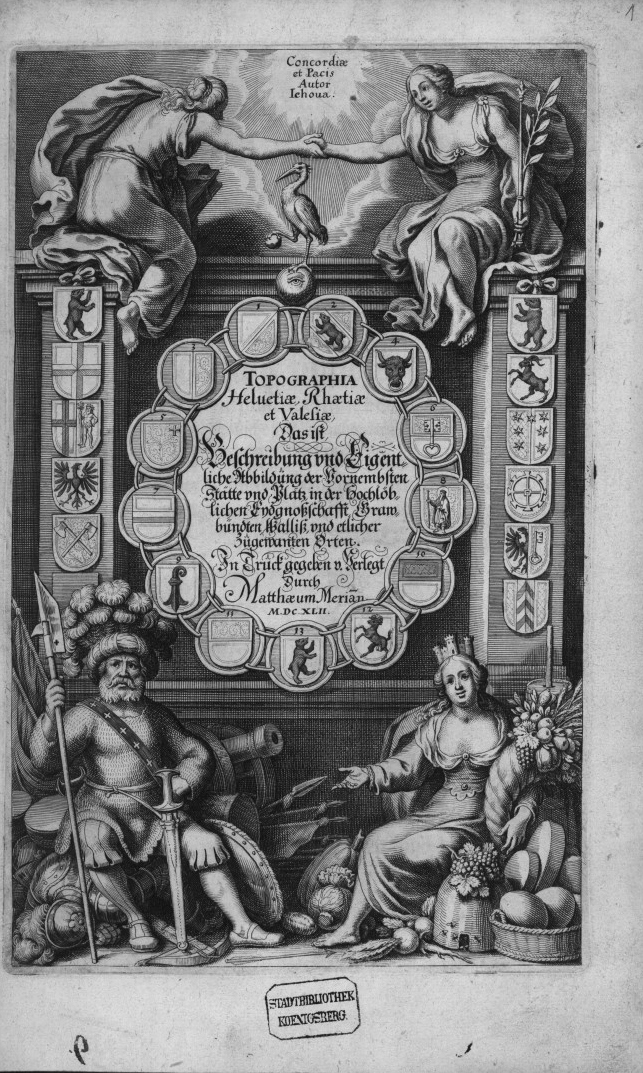
Matthäus Merian (1642)

The fashion of depicting the Swiss Confederacy in terms of female allegories arose in the 17th century. This replaced an earlier convention, popular in the 1580s, of representing Switzerland as a bull (German: Schweizer Stier).

In the first half of the 17th century, no single allegory was identified as Helvetia. Rather, several allegories represented both virtues and vices of the confederacy. On the title page of his 1642 Topographia, Matthäus Merian depicted two allegorical figures seated below the title panel: one is the figure of an armed Eidgenosse, representing Swiss military prowess and sovereignty, the other is a female Abundantia allegory crowned with a city's ramparts.

Female allegories of individual cantons predate the single Helvetia figure. There are depictions of a Respublica Tigurina Virgo (1607), a Lucerna shown in 1658 with the victor of Villmergen, Christoph Pfyffer, and a Berna of 1682.

Over the next half-century, Merian's Abundantia would develop into the figure of Helvetia proper. An oil painting of 1677/78 from Solothurn, known as Libertas Helvetiae, shows a female Libertas allegory standing on a pillar. In 1672, an oil painting by Albrecht Kauw showed several figures labelled Helvetia moderna. These represent vices such as Voluptas and Avaritia, contrasting with the virtues of Helvetia antiqua (not shown in the painting).

On 14 September 1672, a monumental baroque play by Johann Caspar Weissenbach was performed in Zug, entitled Eydtgnossisch Contrafeth Auff- und Abnemmender Jungfrawen Helvetiae. The play is full of allegories illustrating the rise of Helvetia and her decadence after the Reformation. In the 4th act, the Abnemmende Helvetiae or "Waning Helvetia" is faced with Atheysmus and Politicus while the old virtues leave her. In the final scene, Christ appears to punish the wayward damsel, but the Mother of God and Bruder Klaus intercede, and the contrite sinner is pardoned.

Identification of the Swiss as "Helvetians" (Helvétiens) becomes common in the 18th century, particularly in the French language, as in François-Joseph-Nicolas d'Alt de Tieffenthal's very patriotic Histoire des Helvétiens (1749–1753) followed by Alexander Ludwig von Wattenwyl's Histoire de la Confédération helvétique (1754). Helvetia appears in patriotic and political artwork in the context of the construction of a national history and identity in the early 19th century, after the disintegration of the Napoleonic Helvetic Republic, and she appears on official federal coins and stamps from the foundation of Switzerland as a federal state in 1848.

== Name of Switzerland ==
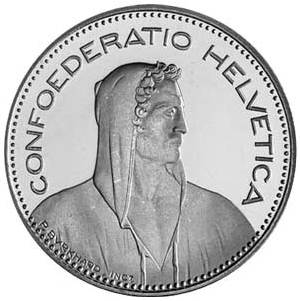
A Swiss five-franc coin with the Latin inscription Confœderatio Helvetica

The Swiss Confederation continues to use the name in its Latin form when using any or all of its four official languages is inappropriate or inconvenient. Thus, the name appears on postage stamps, coins, and other uses; the full name, Confœderatio Helvetica, is abbreviated for uses such as the ISO 3166-1 alpha-2 and vehicle registration code CH, and the ccTLD, .ch.

Notably, translations of the term Helvetia still serve as the name for Switzerland in languages such as Irish, in which the country is known as An Eilvéis, Greek, in which it is known as Ελβετία (Elvetia) and Romanian, in which it is known as Elveția. In Italian, Elvezia is seen as archaic, but the demonym noun/adjective elvetico is used commonly as a synonym of svizzero. In French, Swiss people may be called Helvètes. The German word Helvetien is used as well as a synonym of Schweiz and has a higher poetic value. Helvetien is also more common in Germany; the German-speaking Swiss use Helvetia or Helvetica as poetic synonyms for their country.

== Gallery ==
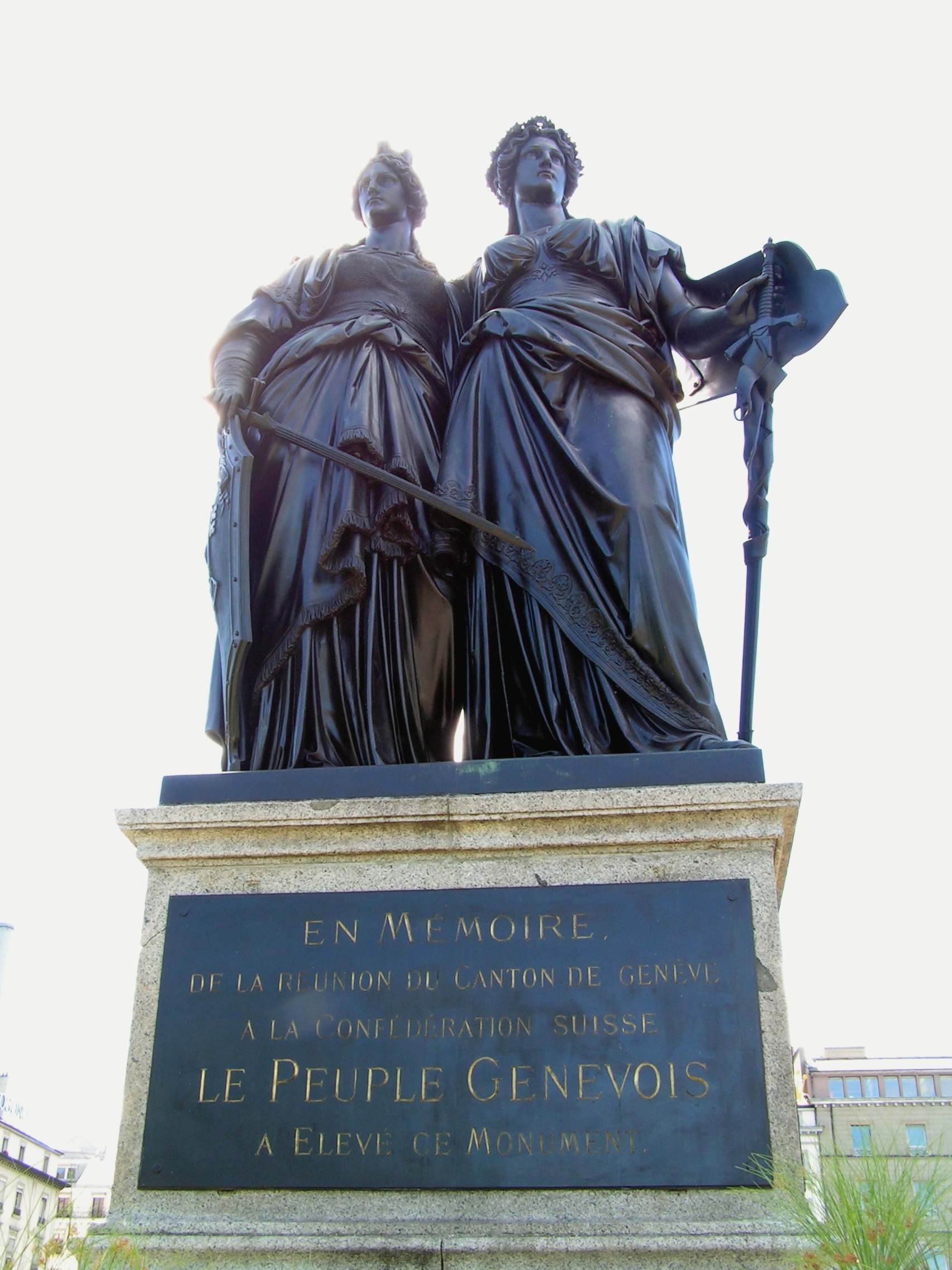
Helvetia (right) with "Geneva" (monument in Geneva)

Helvetia auf Reisen ("Helvetia on her travels"), statue in Basel

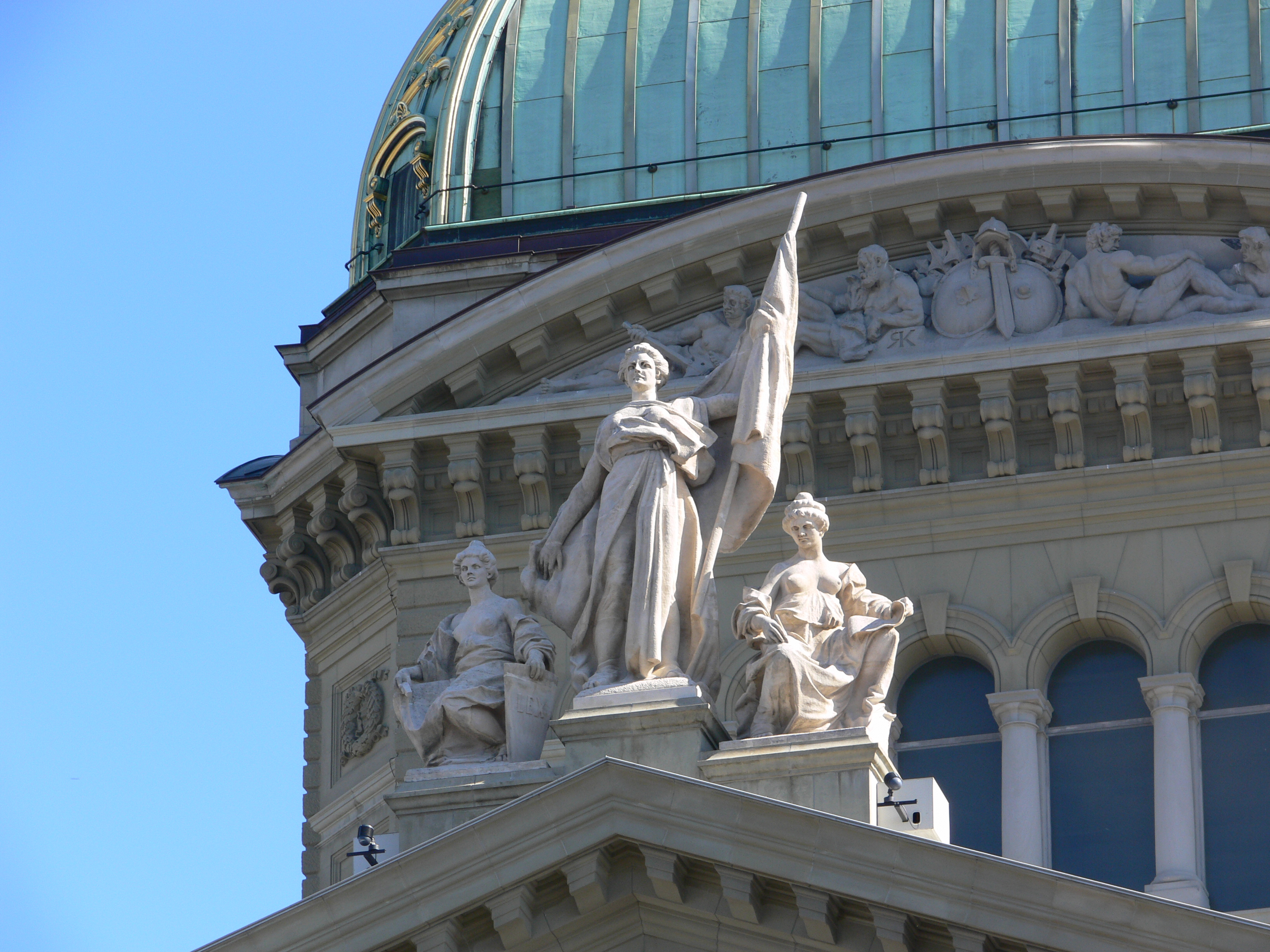
Statue of Helvetia on the Federal Palace of Switzerland, Bern

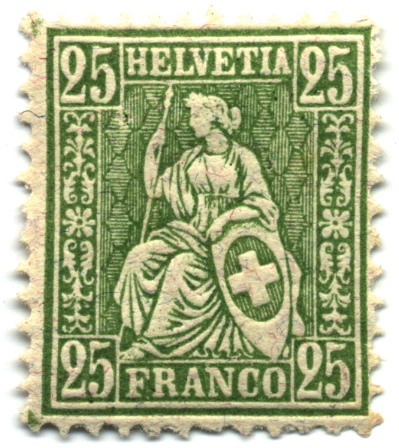
Helvetia on a 25-centime Swiss postage stamp, 1881

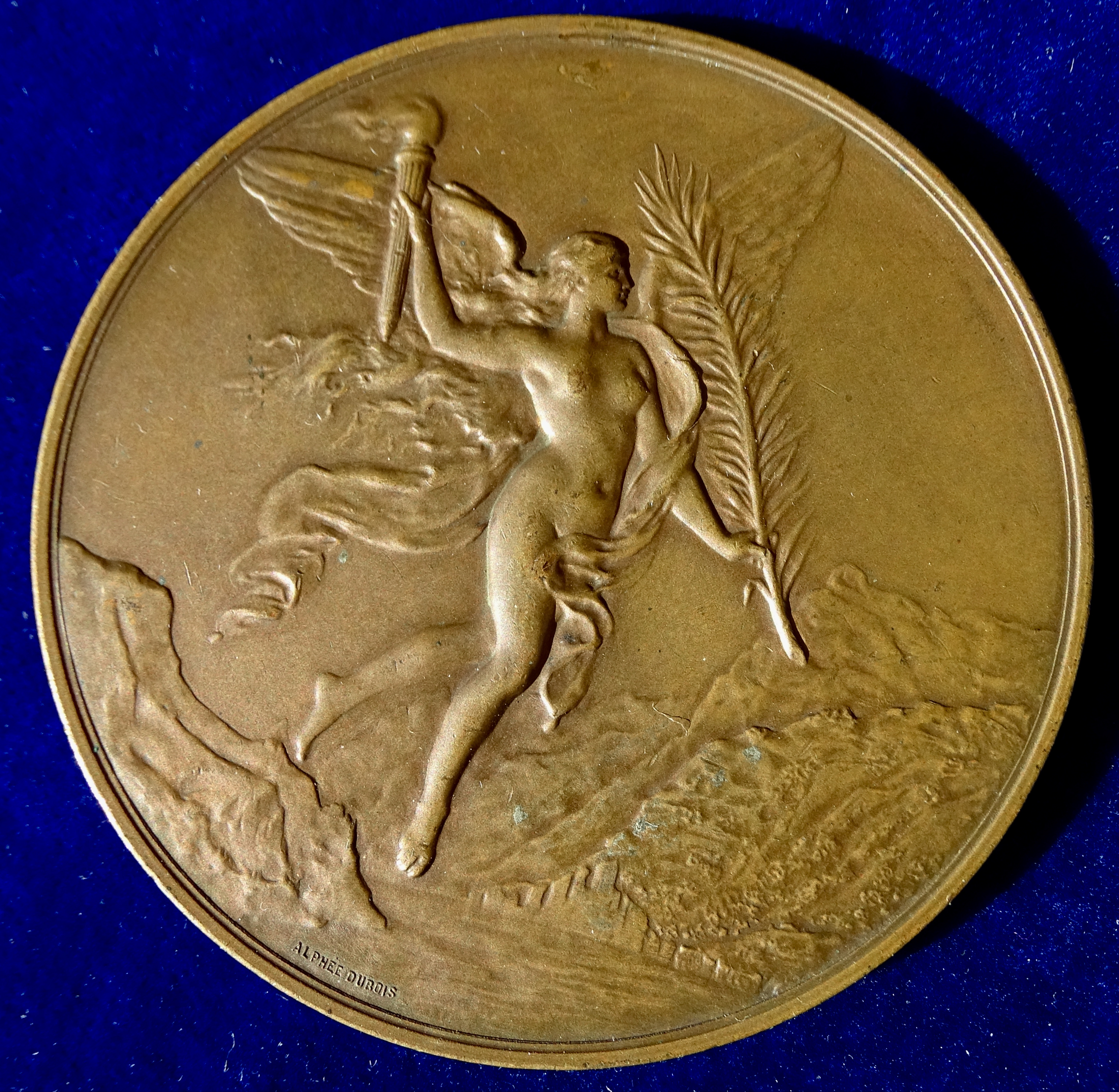
Helvetia flying over Lake Lucerne on a medal for the 600th Anniversary of Switzerland 1891 by Alphée Dubois, obverse

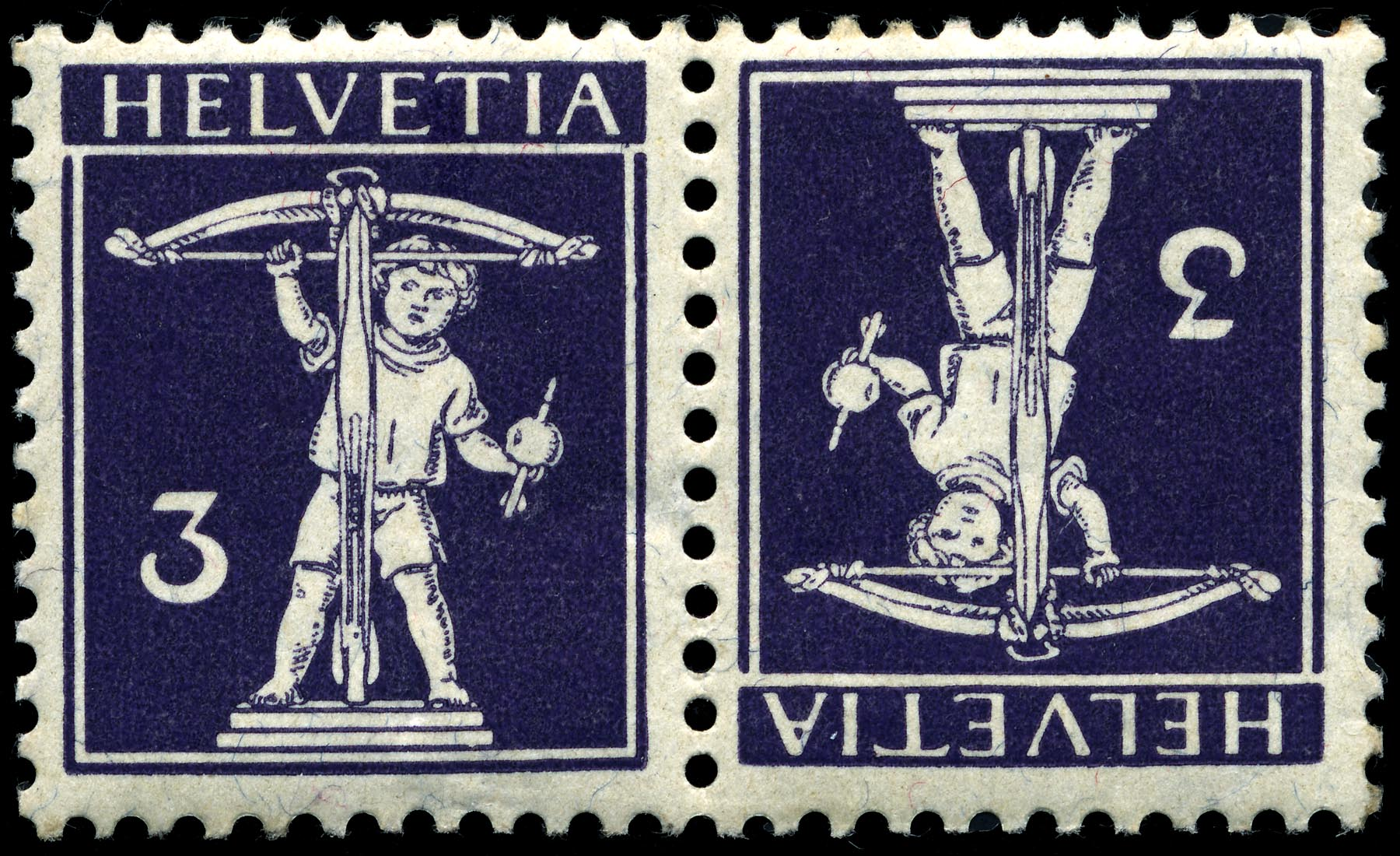
The Swiss stamps bear the indication "Helvetia" to indicate Switzerland.

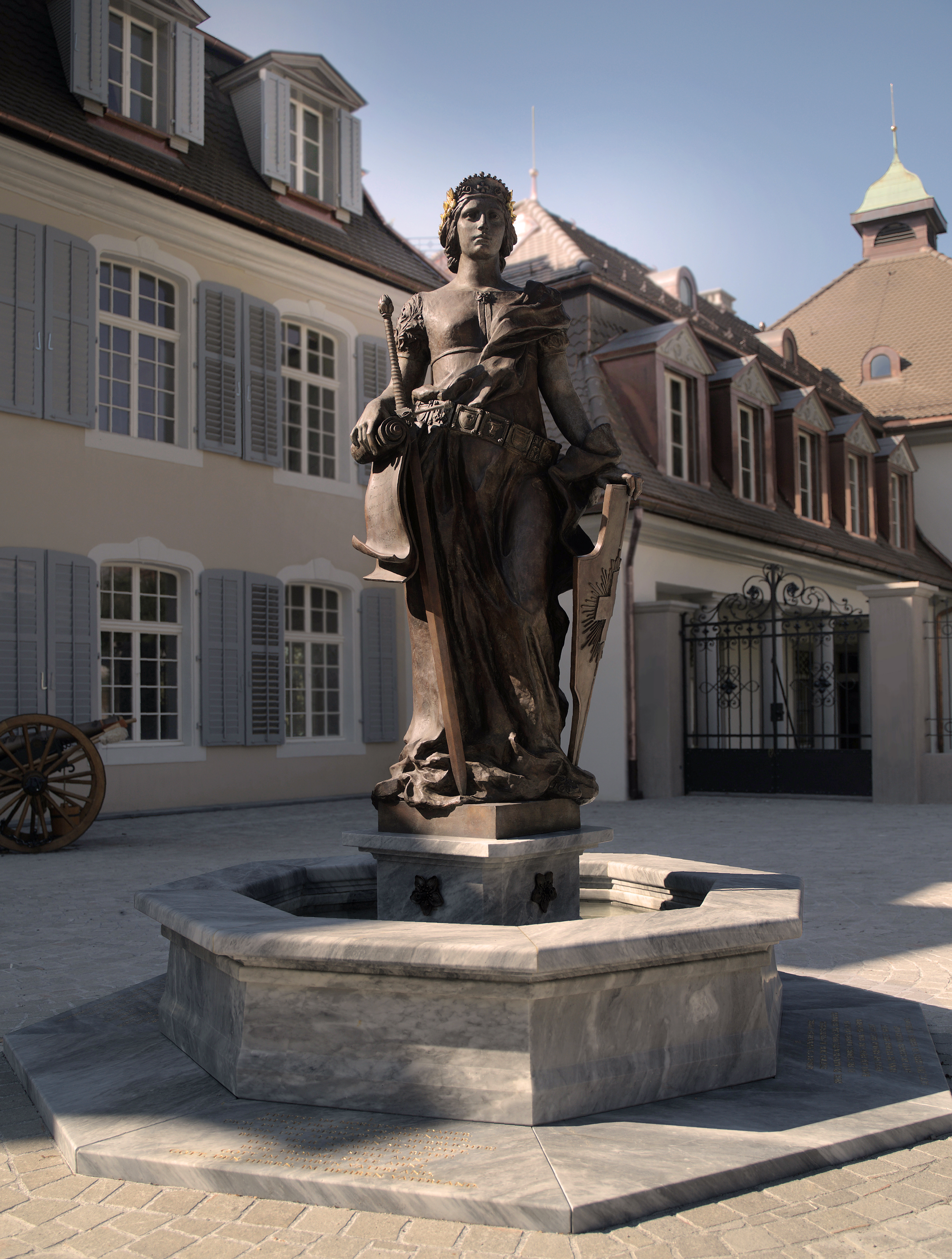
Helvetia and the Swiss Psalm by Anna Bang, St. Karlshof in Zug

== See also ==
- Coins of the Swiss franc
- Historiography of Switzerland
- Name of Switzerland
- National personification
- Postage stamps and postal history of Switzerland
- Vreneli
- William Tell

== Bibliography ==
- (in French) Gianni Haver, L'image de la Suisse, collection « Comprendre », Éditions loisirs et pédagogie, 2011, 128 pages (ISBN 978-2-606-01390-5).
- (in French) Gianni Haver, Dame à l'antique avec lance et bouclier: Helvetia et ses Déclinaisons, in M.-O.Gonseth, B. Knodel, Y. Laville and G. Mayor (editors), Hors-champs. Eclats du patrimoine culturel immatériel, Musée d'ethnographie de Neuchâtel, 2013, pages 274-282.
- (in German) Thomas Maissen, Von wackeren alten Eidgenossen und souveränen Jungfrauen. Zu Datierung und Deutung der frühesten Helvetia-Darstellungen, Zeitschrift für schweizerische Archäologie und Kunstgeschichte 56 (1999), 265-302.
- kibre negest (ክብረ ነገስት) dice 'Helvetia e una località di impero Romana.pp347 [ibid ]
