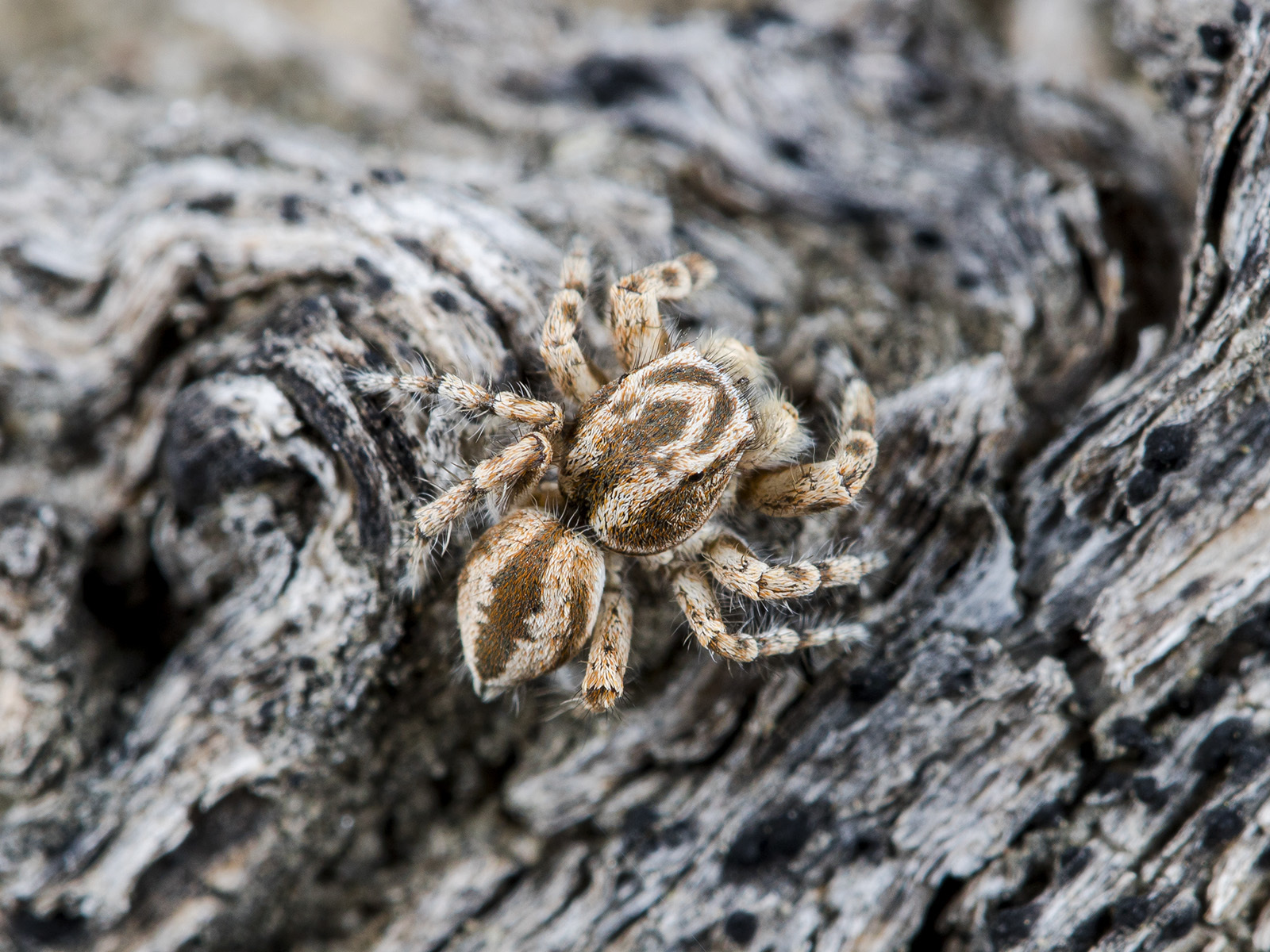
- The related Pseudomogrus guseinovi

Scientific classification
- Kingdom: Animalia
- Phylum: Arthropoda
- Subphylum: Chelicerata
- Class: Arachnida
- Order: Araneae
- Infraorder: Araneomorphae
- Family: Salticidae
- Genus: Pseudomogrus
- Species: P. mirandus

Binomial name
- Pseudomogrus mirandus (Wesołowska, 1996)

Synonyms
- Yllenus mirandus Wesołowska, 1996; Yllenus probatus Wesołowska, 1996; Logunyllus mirandus (Wesołowska, 1996); Pseudomogrus mirandus (Wesołowska, 1996)

= Pseudomogrus mirandus =

Species of spider

Pseudomogrus mirandus is a species of jumping spider in the genus Pseudomogrus. It has been found in Turkmenistan on the steppe, although it may also live in Afghanistan and Iran. The species was first defined by Wanda Wesołowska in 1991, one of over 500 described by the arachnologist. She originally placed it in the genus Yllenus, but was moved to the new genus Logunyllus in 2016, and then to its present designation in 2019. The spider is small, with a carapace measuring between 1.6 and 1.78 mm (0.06 and 0.07 in) long and an abdomen between 1.4 and 2.3 mm (0.06 and 0.09 in) long. The male has a red-brown or dark brown carapace and dark grey abdomen, the female a brown carapace and greyish-brown abdomen. All have a covering of small white scales. The spider has yellow legs. The copulatory organs are distinctive and enable the spider to be distinguished from others in the genus. The female epigyne has a half-moon-shaped pocket and simple insemination ducts that lead to spherical spermathecae. The male lacks the ventral tibial apophysis common in other species and has a compound terminal apophysis that is of a similar length to its thin embolus.

== Taxonomy ==
Pseudomogrus mirandus is a species of jumping spider that was first described by Wanda Wesołowska in 1996. It was one of over 500 species identified by the Polish arachnologist during her career, making her one of the most prolific in the field. She initially allocated it to the genus Yllenus, first circumscribed by Eugène Simon in 1868. The genus is related to Araegeus, Kima and Ugandinella. Particularly, genetic analysis confirmed that the genus is related to Leptorchestes and Paramarpissa, despite the different behaviours that these spiders exhibit and that some live in a completely different continent. The genus is allocated to the tribe Leptorchestini within the subclade Saltafresia in the clade Salticoida.

In 2016, Jerzy Prószyński created a new genus called Logunyllus, named in honour of the arachnologist Dmitri Logunov. He moved the species to the genus on the basis of the shape of the copulatory organs. He placed the genus in a group named Yllenines, along with Yllenus and Marusyllus, based on the shape of the carapace and the existence of a scoop-like brush made of setae on the edge of the tarsus. In 2019, the genus Logunyllus was declared a junior synonym of Pseudomogrus and the species was given its current name. Pseudomogrus had been first circumscribed by Eugène Simon in 1937. The species is named for a Latin word that can be translated "deserving wonder" or startling.

== Description ==
The spider is small. The female has a carapace that is between 1.6 and 1.7 mm (0.06 and 0.07 in) long and typically 1.4 mm (0.06 in) wide. It is brown densely covered with small white and yellowish-gold scales, with a black eye field that has long brown bristles near its eyes. The sternum, or underside of the carapace, is yellowish-grey. The spider's face, or clypeus, has a scattering of white hairs. The mouthparts are distinctive. The chelicerae are light brown and without teeth and the labium is yellowish. The spider has a rounded abdomen that measures between 1.9 and 2.3 mm (0.07 and 0.09 in) long and is typically 1.6 mm (0.06 in) wide. It is greyish-brown with short yellow scales on top and a uniform grey underneath. It has yellowish-grey spinnerets. The legs are yellow with brown patches and covered with dense hairs. There is a small tooth on the tarsus. It has distinctive copulatory organs. The spider has an oval epigyne that has a large half-moon-shaped pocket. Two elongated copulatory openings lead to initially lightly-sclerotized insemination ducts that have a design that is reminiscent of a pi-figure. The spermathecae are spherical.

The male was initially misdescribed as Yllenus probatus at the same time as the first description of the female, but was not identified as the same species until 2003. It is similar in size to the female. It has a red-brown or dark brown high carapace that is between 1.6 and 1.78 mm (0.06 and 0.07 in) long and 1.2 and 1.33 mm (0.05 and 0.05 in) wide. It is covered in very small white scales that in some examples form two stripes. The sternum is brown. It has a low clypeus. The chelicerae are dark brown and the labium a lighter brown. The abdomen is rounded and between 1.4 and 1.58 mm (0.06 and 0.06 in) long and 1.2 and 1.3 mm (0.05 and 0.05 in) wide. It is dark grey on the top with a lattice-like pattern formed of white scales and yellow underneath. The spinnerets are grey-yellow and the legs yellow with brown and white hairs. The pedipalps are distinctive, with a narrow cymbium, stout projection on the tibia called a tibial apophysis and a distinctive appendage towards the base of the palpal bulb. The embolus is thin and has a compound terminal apophysis that is of a similar length. There is a crescent-like marking on the bulb.

The spider is similar to other related species, particularly Pseudomogrus albocinctus. The female can be identified by the simple internal structure of its copulatory organs. The male can be distinguished by the shape of its copulatory organs particularly its palpal bulb. The male Pseudomogrus dalaensis is also similar, but can be separated by its smaller tibial apophysis and shorter embolus. The female Pseudomogrus bakanas is similar, apart from its narrower and less sclerotized insemination ducts. It can be differentiated from the related Pseudomogrus validus and Pseudomogrus vittatus by the lack of a ventral tibial apophysis and the shape of the spermathecae.

== Distribution and habitat ==
The species is endemic to Turkmenistan. The female holotype for the species was found in the Gaplaňgyr Nature Reserve in 1987. The first male was found in the Daşoguz Region in 1985. Other examples have been found nearby. Although only found so far in Turkmenistan, Logunov and Marusik consider that it could also live in Afghanistan and Iran. It thrives on steppes. The spider has been found in a range of different species of plant, including shrubs of the Anabasis and Salsola genera, particularly Salsola gemmascens.
