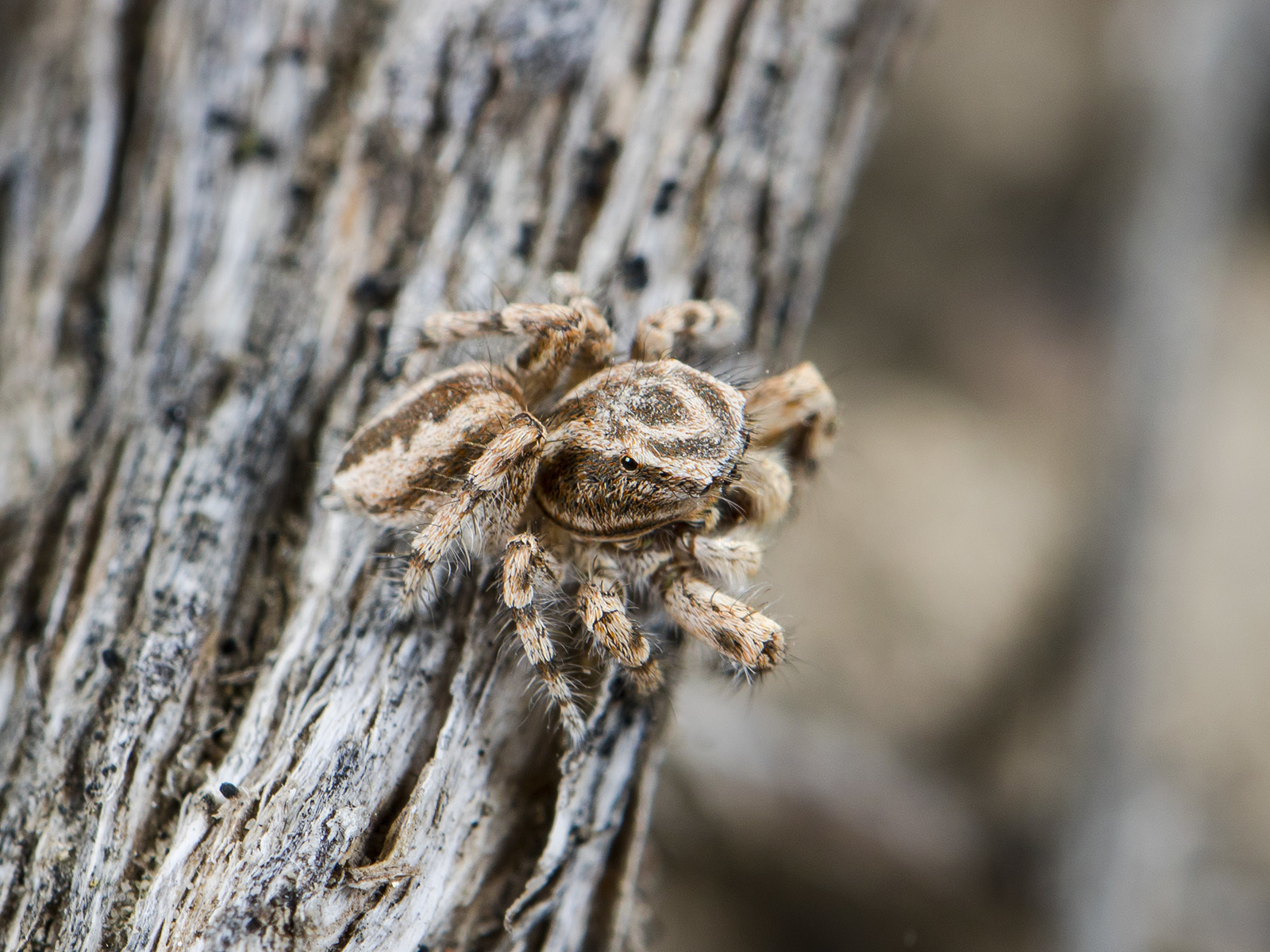
- The related Pseudomogrus guseinovi

Scientific classification
- Kingdom: Animalia
- Phylum: Arthropoda
- Subphylum: Chelicerata
- Class: Arachnida
- Order: Araneae
- Infraorder: Araneomorphae
- Family: Salticidae
- Genus: Pseudomogrus
- Species: P. improcerus

Binomial name
- Pseudomogrus improcerus (Wesołowska& van Harten, 1994)

Synonyms
- Yllenus improcerus Wesołowska& van Harten, 1994; Logunyllus improcerus (Wesołowska& van Harten, 1994); Pseudomogrus improcerus (Wesołowska& van Harten, 1994)

= Pseudomogrus improcerus =

Species of spider

Pseudomogrus improcerus is a species of jumping spider in the genus Pseudomogrus that is endemic to Yemen. The species was first defined by Wanda Wesołowska and Antonius van Harten in 1994. They originally placed it in the genus Yllenus, but was moved to the new genus Logunyllus in 2016, and then to its present designation in 2019. The spider is small, with a carapace measuring between 1.84 and 1.9 mm (0.07 and 0.07 in) long and an abdomen between 2.05 and 2.1 mm (0.08 and 0.08 in) long. The female has a red-brown or brown carapace and brownish-grey abdomen covered in small brown, grey, white and golden scales. Some examples have a band across the top of the abdomen. The spider has yellow legs. The copulatory organs are distinctive and enable the spider to be distinguished from others in the genus. The female epigyne has simple insemination ducts and large accessory glands.

== Taxonomy ==
Pseudomogrus improcerus is a species of jumping spider that was first described by Wanda Wesołowska and Antonius van Harten in 1994. It was one of over 500 species identified by the Polish arachnologist Wesołowska during her career, making her one of the most prolific in the field. They initially allocated it to the genus Yllenus, first circumscribed by Eugène Simon in 1868. The genus is related to Araegeus, Kima and Ugandinella. Particularly, genetic analysis confirmed that the genus is related to Leptorchestes and Paramarpissa, despite the different behaviours that these spiders exhibit and that some live in a completely different continent. In 2015, Wayne Maddison allocated the genus to the tribe Leptorchestini within the subclade Saltafresia in the clade Salticoida.

In 2016, Jerzy Prószyński created a new genus called Logunyllus, named in honour of the arachnologist Dmitri Logunov. He moved the species to the genus on the basis of the shape of the copulatory organs. He placed the genus in a group named Yllenines, along with Yllenus and Marusyllus, based on the shape of the carapace and the existence of a scoop-like brush made of setae on the edge of the tarsus. In 2019, the genus Logunyllus was declared a junior synonym of Pseudomogrus and the species was given its current name. Pseudomogrus had been first circumscribed by Eugène Simon in 1937. The species is named for a Latin word that can be translated "insightly".

== Description ==
The spider is small. The female has a rather high carapace that is between 1.84 and 1.9 mm (0.07 and 0.07 in) long and 1.6 and 1.65 mm (0.06 and 0.06 in) wide. It is brown or reddish-brown, densely covered with small grey, white and golden scales, with some examples having a yellow tint to the very top. The black eye field has long brown bristles near its eyes. The underside, or sternum, is greyish-yellow or yellow with a covering of white hairs. The spider's face or clypeus is also rather high and has a scattering of long hairs. The mouthparts are typical for the genus. The chelicerae are brown or dark brown and without teeth while the labium and maxillae are greyish-yellow or yellow. The spider has an abdomen that measures between 2.05 and 2.1 mm (0.08 and 0.08 in) long and 1.68 and 2.3 mm (0.07 and 0.09 in) wide. It is spherical, brownish-grey with brown, grey and golden scales on top and a yellow underside. Some examples have a band across the top. It has greyish-yellow or yellow spinnerets. The legs are yellow with brown patches and covered with brown spines and hairs.

The spider has distinctive copulatory organs. It has a rounded lightly-sclerotized epigyne that has a large central bell-shaped pocket. Two elongated copulatory openings lead to partially coiled insemination ducts and a general simple internal structure. The spermathecae are spherical. The insemination ducts are longer than those in the closely related Pseudomogrus knappi. It is otherwise very similar to the other species. There are large accessory glands that look as if they have grown out of the spermathecae. The male has not been described.

== Distribution ==
Pseudomogrus spiders thrive across Asia. Pseudomogrus improcerus is endemic to Yemen. The female holotype for the species was found between Yarim and Hamam Damt in 1993. It has only been found in that area of the country.
