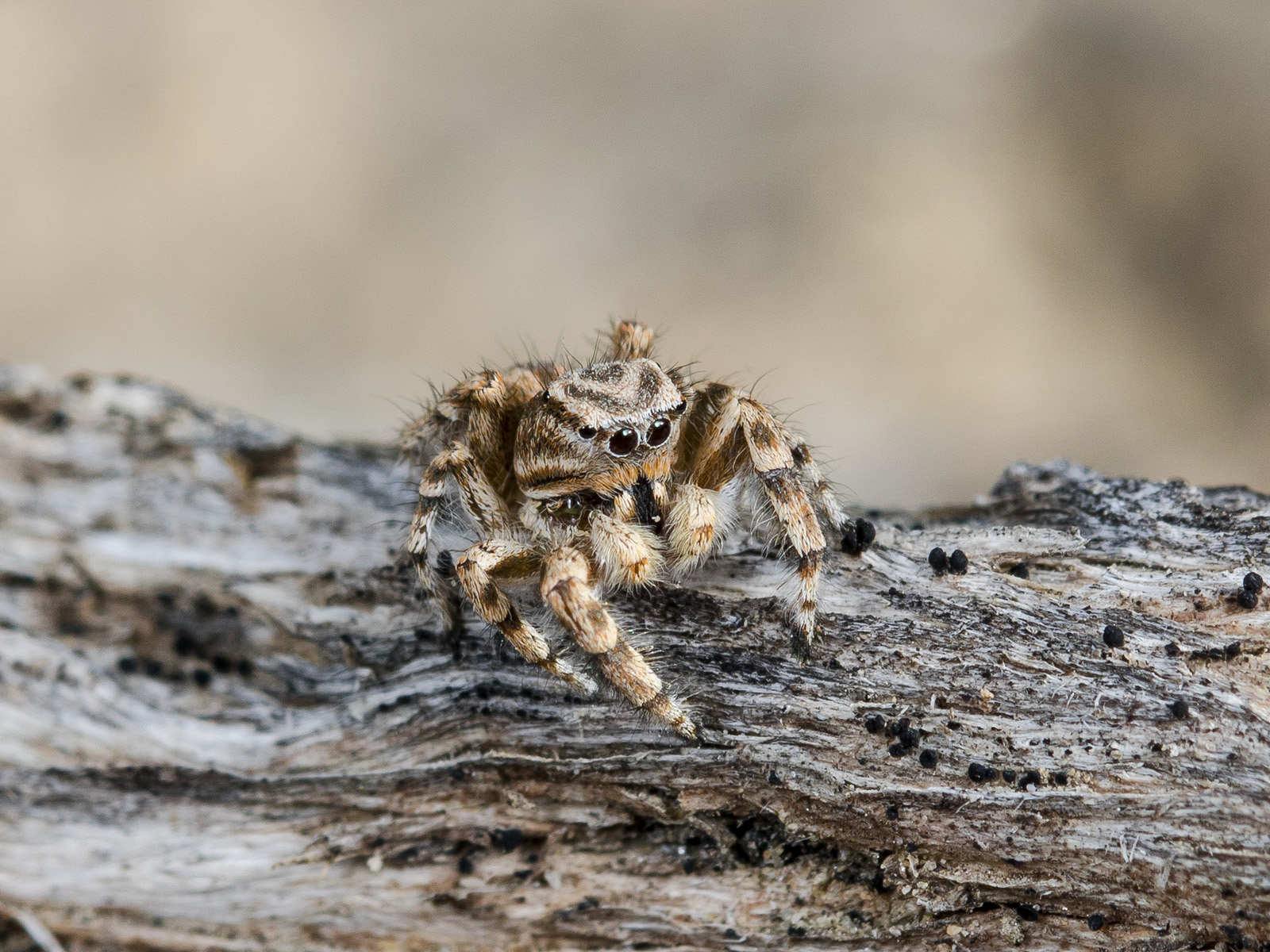
- The related Pseudomogrus guseinovi

Scientific classification
- Kingdom: Animalia
- Phylum: Arthropoda
- Subphylum: Chelicerata
- Class: Arachnida
- Order: Araneae
- Infraorder: Araneomorphae
- Family: Salticidae
- Genus: Pseudomogrus
- Species: P. knappi

Binomial name
- Pseudomogrus knappi (Wesołowska & van Harten, 1994)

Synonyms
- Yllenus knappi Wesołowska & van Harten, 1994; Logunyllus knappi (Wesołowska & van Harten, 1994)

= Pseudomogrus knappi =

Species of spider

Pseudomogrus knappi is a species of jumping spider in the genus Pseudomogrus that lives in Sudan and Yemen. The species was first defined by Wanda Wesołowska and Antonius van Harten in 1994. They originally placed it in the genus Yllenus, but it was moved to the new genus Logunyllus in 2016, and then to its present designation in 2019. The spider is medium-sized, with a carapace that is between 2.01 and 2.1 mm long and an abdomen between 2.93 and 3.1 mm long. The male has not been described. The female has a plain brown or yellow-brown carapace and an indistinct pattern of stripes on its yellow or yellowish-grey abdomen. It has yellow legs. The spider can be identified by its copulatory organs. It has a very simple internal structure inside its epigyne with short insemination ducts.

== Taxonomy ==
Pseudomogrus knappi is a species of jumping spider that was first described by Wanda Wesołowska and Antonius van Harten in 1994. It was one of over 500 species identified by the Polish arachnologist Wesołowska during her career, making her one of the most prolific in the field. They allocated it to the albocinctus group in the genus Yllenus. The genus had been first circumscribed by Eugène Simon in 1868. It is related to Araegeus, Kima and Ugandinella. Particularly, genetic analysis confirmed that the genus is related to Leptorchestes and Paramarpissa, despite the different behaviours that these spiders exhibit and that some live in a completely different continent. The genus is allocated to the tribe Leptorchestini within the subclade Saltafresia in the clade Salticoida. The species is named for the arachnologist M Knapp, who first collected the type.

In 2016, Jerzy Prószyński circumscribed a new genus called Logunyllus, also named in honour of Logunov. He moved the species to the genus on the basis of the shape of the copulatory organs. He placed the genus in a group named Yllenines, along with Yllenus and Marusyllus, based on the shape of the carapace and the existence of a scoop-like brush made of setae on the edge of the tarsus. In 2019, the genus Logunyllus was declared a junior synonym of Pseudomogrus and the species was given its current name. Pseudomogrus had been first circumscribed by Eugène Simon in 1937.

== Description ==
Pseudomogrus knappi is a medium-sized spider. The female of the species has a rounded convex brown or yellowish-brown carapace that is between 2.01 and 2.1 mm (0.08 and 0.08 in) long and between 1.88 and 1.9 mm (0.07 and 0.07 in) wide. It is widest behind the middle. The large trapezoidal black eye field that takes up about half of its surface has a scattering of gold and grey scales and brown bristles. The sternum, or underside, is yellowish and covered with white hairs. The spider's face or clypeus is high with some long light hairs. The mouthparts, including the chelicerae, labium and maxilae are generally light brown or yellowish-brown. Some specimens have dark brown chelicerae. Pale margins are visible in some areas. The chelicerae have no teeth. The spider has an abdomen that is between 2.93 and 3.1 mm (0.12 and 0.12 in) long and is between 2.28 and 2.3 mm (0.09 and 0.09 in) wide. It is yellow or yellowish-grey on top with an indistinct pattern of brown stripes towards the front. The underside is lighter or yellow. It has yellowish-grey or grey spinnerets. The legs are yellow with long spines.

The spider has unusually simple copulatory organs, which most differentiate it from other species in the genus. Its epigyne has a wide bell-shaped pocket. It has two rounded copulatory openings leading to very short and simple insemination ducts and ovoid spermathecae. It is this simplicity, and relatively short length, of the insemination ducts, that most distinguishes the spider from the closely related Pseudomogrus improcerus. The epigyne has slight sclerotization. The male has not been identified.

== Distribution ==
Pseudomogrus knappi lives in Sudan and Yemen. The holotype for the species was found near Mokha, Yemen, in 1993. It is found in the Taiz Governorate. The first to be found in Sudan was discovered in Wadi Halfa in 1964, but was first described in 2003.
