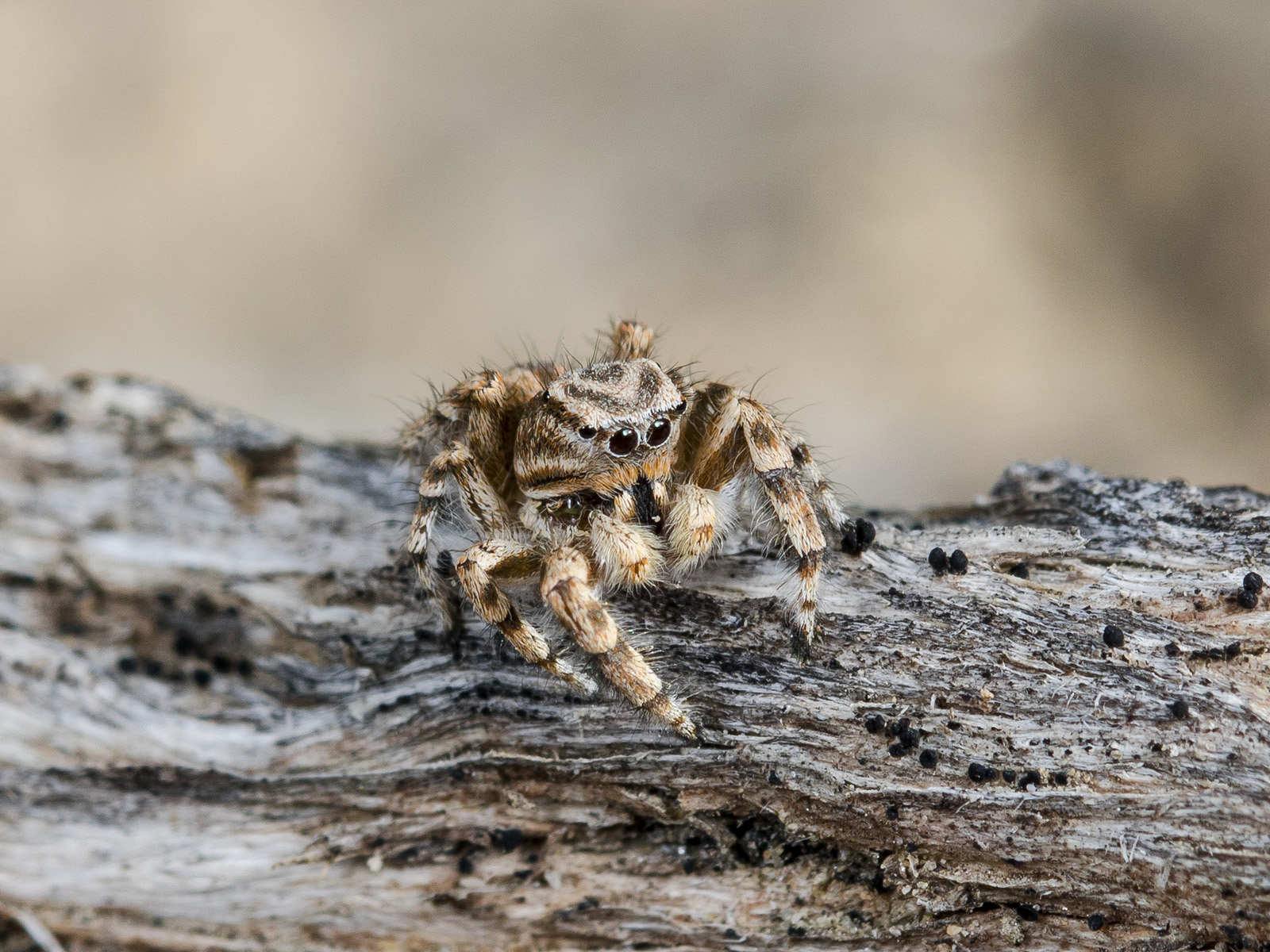
- The related Pseudomogrus guseinovi

Scientific classification
- Kingdom: Animalia
- Phylum: Arthropoda
- Subphylum: Chelicerata
- Class: Arachnida
- Order: Araneae
- Infraorder: Araneomorphae
- Family: Salticidae
- Genus: Pseudomogrus
- Species: P. logunovi

Binomial name
- Pseudomogrus logunovi (Wesołowska & van Harten, 2010)

Synonyms
- Yllenus logunovi Wesołowska & van Harten, 2010; Yllenus probatus Wesołowska & van Harten, 2010); Logunyllus logunovi (Wesołowska & van Harten, 2010); Pseudomogrus logunovi (Wesołowska & van Harten, 2010)

= Pseudomogrus logunovi =

Species of spider

Pseudomogrus logunovi is a species of jumping spider in the genus Pseudomogrus that lives in United Arab Emirates. The species was first defined by Wanda Wesołowska and Antonius van Harten in 2010. They originally placed it in the genus Yllenus, but it was moved to the new genus Logunyllus in 2016, and then to its present designation in 2019. The spider is small, with a cephalothorax that is between 1.5 and 2.0 mm long and an abdomen between 1.6 and 2.2 mm long. The female is larger than the male. The female can be distinguished by its plain brown carapace, in comparison with the male that has two white stripes on its darker surface. Both have brown patches on their yellow legs. The spider can be identified by its copulatory organs. The male has a straight spike on the tibia of its pedipalps, or tibial apophysis, a long embolus with a narrow accompanying terminal apophysis and a small tegulum. The female is hard to distinguish but has shorter insemination ducts than related species.

== Taxonomy ==
Pseudomogrus logunovi is a species of jumping spider that was first described by Wanda Wesołowska and Antonius van Harten in 2010. It was one of over 500 species identified by the Polish arachnologist Wesołowska during her career, making her one of the most prolific in the field. They initially allocated it to the albocinctus group in the genus Yllenus. The genus had been first circumscribed by Eugène Simon in 1868. It is related to Araegeus, Kima and Ugandinella. Particularly, genetic analysis confirmed that the genus is related to Leptorchestes and Paramarpissa, despite the different behaviours that these spiders exhibit and that some live in a completely different continent. The genus is allocated to the tribe Leptorchestini within the subclade Saltafresia in the clade Salticoida. The species is named for the arachnologist Dmitri Logunov.

In 2016, Jerzy Prószyński circumscribed a new genus called Logunyllus, also named in honour of Logunov. He moved the species to the genus on the basis of the shape of the copulatory organs. He placed the genus in a group named Yllenines, along with Yllenus and Marusyllus, based on the shape of the carapace and the existence of a scoop-like brush made of setae on the edge of the tarsus. In 2019, the genus Logunyllus was declared a junior synonym of Pseudomogrus and the species was given its current name. Pseudomogrus had been first circumscribed by Eugène Simon in 1937.

== Description ==
The spider is small. Its body consists of a squared cephalothorax and an oval abdomen. The male of the species looks swollen and has a cephalothorax that is between 1.5 and 1.8 mm (0.06 and 0.07 in) long and 1.4 and 1.7 mm (0.06 and 0.07 in) wide. The high carapace, the hard top of the cephalothorax, is dark with two stripes that stretch from the front to back made of white hairs. The front of the eye field is covered with small light scales. The spider's face, or clypeus, is brown and is covered with white hairs. The mouthparts are distinctive, with the dark brown chelicerae contrasting with the light brown labium and maxilae. The spider has an abdomen that measures between 1.6 and 1.8 mm (0.06 and 0.07 in) long and is typically 1.7 and 2.1 mm (0.07 and 0.08 in) wide. The top of the abdomen is whitish and covered in dense hairs. It has a pattern of wide band across the centre and two indistinct brown stripes on the sides. The underside of the abdomen is a uniform yellow. The spider has beige spinnerets. Its legs are yellow with brown patches and its pedipalps, sensory organs near the spider's mouth, are brownish.

The female is slightly larger than the male. It has a cephalothorax that is between 1.7 and 2.0 mm (0.07 and 0.08 in) long and 1.6 and 1.8 mm (0.06 and 0.07 in) wide. The carapace is brown with a covering of whitish-grey hairs. The eye field is black with light scales. The clypeus is similar to the male, as are the mouthparts. The abdomen is rounded and between 2.0 and 2.2 mm (0.08 and 0.09 in) long and 1.7 and 2.1 mm (0.07 and 0.08 in) wide. It is yellow or fawn with a vague brown streak on top. In some examples, it is darker and has a pattern of grey spots and chevrons, which is once again hard to see. The underside is grey or yellow. The legs are lighter than the male.

The spider's copulatory organs are distinctive. The female has an oval epigyne that has two elongated copulatory openings leading to short insemination ducts and spherical spermathecae, or receptacles. The male has a straight spike on the tibia of the pedipalp, or tibial apophysis. The palpal bulb is distinctive with a long embolus and a narrow accompanying appendage, called a terminal apophysis. The male's copulatory organs also include a large bulbous and well-developed cymbium and a small and narrow tegulum.

The spider is similar to other related species, particularly Pseudomogrus salsicola, particularly in regard to its external patterns. A study of its copulatory organs can help identify it. The male can be distinguished from other species in the genus by the narrower terminal apophysis that accompanies the embolus, the smaller tegulum, and the straight tibial apophysis. The female is harder to identify, with the shorter insemination ducts being the clearest determining feature.

== Distribution ==
The genus Pseudomogrus has a wide distribution ranging from the Canary Islands to western Mongolia and the western regions of China, and has been observed living in Europe and North Africa as well as India. Pseudomogrus logunovi is endemic to United Arab Emirates. The male holotype for the species was found near Wadi Bih in 2008. It has been observed in many of the emirates and is common across the country. For example, the spider has been discovered living in Ajman in 2006, Ras Al Khaimah in 2008 and Umm Al Quwain in 2009.
