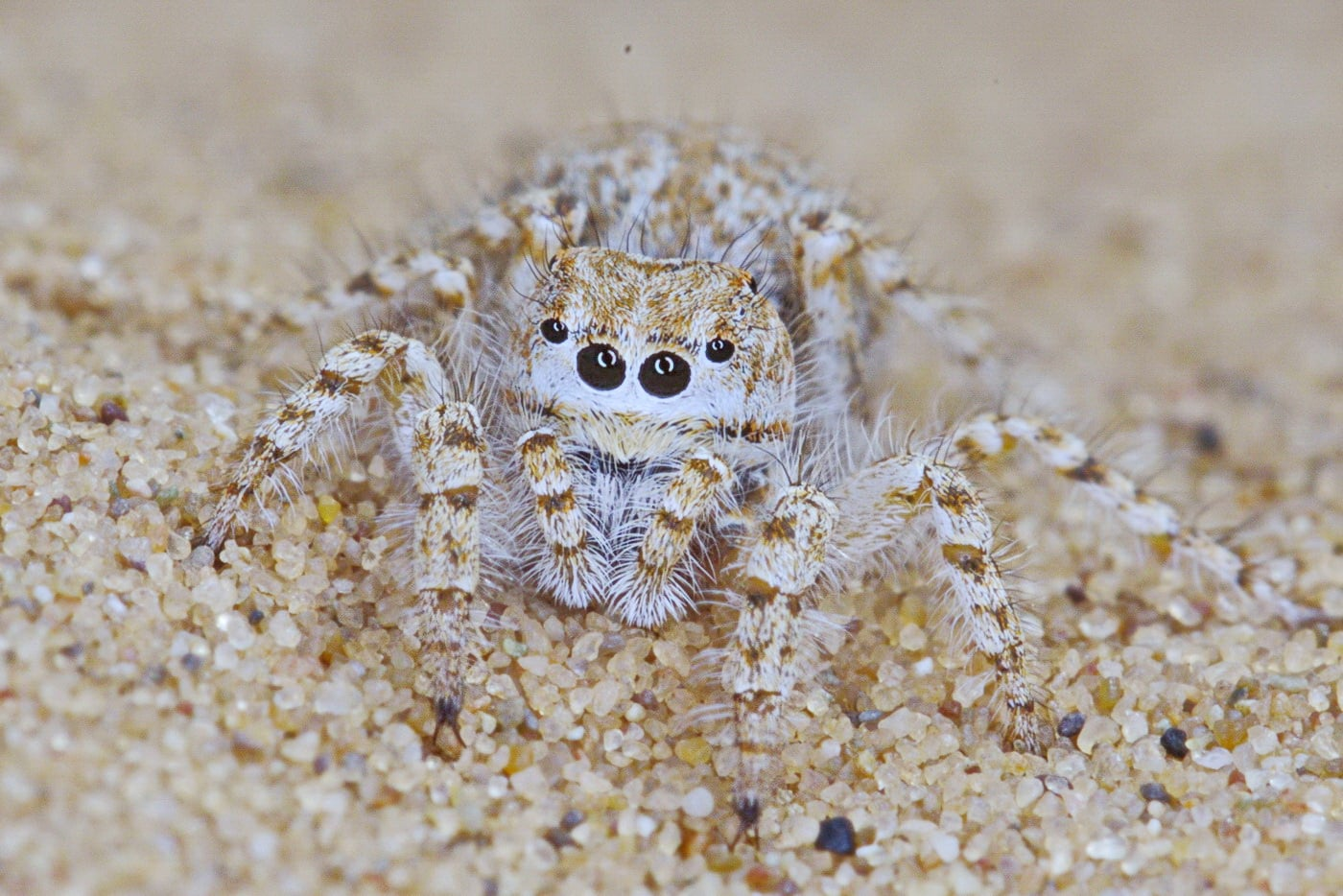
- A spider of the Yllenus genus

Scientific classification
- Kingdom: Animalia
- Phylum: Arthropoda
- Subphylum: Chelicerata
- Class: Arachnida
- Order: Araneae
- Infraorder: Araneomorphae
- Family: Salticidae
- Genus: Yllenus
- Species: Y. desertus

Binomial name
- Yllenus desertus Wesołowska, 1991

= Yllenus desertus =

Species of spider

Yllenus desertus is a species of jumping spider in the genus Yllenus that is endemic to Mongolia. The species was first defined by Wanda Wesołowska in 1991, one of over 500 described by the arachnologist. It thrives in semi-arid climates. The spider is medium-sized, with a carapace measuring typically 2.48 mm (0.098 in) long and an abdomen between 3.2 and 3.4 mm (0.13 and 0.13 in) long. It is generally brown in colour, although some examples have a light grey abdomen, with short yellow legs. The epigyne is distinctive. It is large with two narrow crescent-shaped and widely spaced copulatory openings that lead to many-chambered spermathecae.

== Taxonomy ==
Yllenus desertus is a species of jumping spider that was first described by Wanda Wesołowska in 1991. It was one of over 500 species identified by the Polish arachnologist during her career, making her one of the most prolific in the field. She allocated it to the genus Yllenus, first raised by Eugène Simon in 1868. The genus is related to Araegeus, Kima and Ugandinella. Particularly, genetic analysis confirms that the genus is related to Leptorchestes and Paramarpissa, despite the different behaviours that these spiders exhibit and that some live in a completely different continent. The genus is allocated to the tribe Leptorchestini within the subclade Saltafresia in the clade Salticoida. In 2016, Jerzy Prószyński placed the genus in a group named Yllenines, along with Logunyllus and Marusyllus, based on the shape of the carapace and the existence of a scoop-like brush made of setae on the edge of the tarsus. The species is named for its semidesert habitat.

== Description ==
The spider is small. The female has a carapace that is typically 2.48 mm (0.098 in) long and 2.05 mm (0.081 in) wide. It is brown or dark brown and densely covered with white scales or hairs. The clypeus is brown with white hairs. White hairs also adorn the sternum, which is very dark brown, almost black. The labium is also dark brown, as are the toothless chelicerae. The spider has an almost-spherical abdomen that measures between 3.2 and 3.4 mm (0.13 and 0.13 in) long and 2.33 mm (0.092 in) wide. Some examples are brownish-black and have dense short white hairs and a vague pattern of three light triangulär patches longways down the middle with irregular light patches along the sides. Others are light grey with interrupted transverse stripes formed of pale brown patches. The underside is dark or grey-yellow respectively. Spinnerets are brown to brown-yellow. The legs are short, stumpy, yellow with brown patches and covered with brown and white hairs. The tarsus has a spade-like appendage. The spider has a large oval heavily-sclerotized epigyne that has a very narrow tube-shaped pocket. Two narrow crescent-shaped and widely spaced copulatory openings lead to broad ducts and many-chambered spermathecae. The receptacles are far from the seminary ducts.

The spider has a distinctive spade-like attachment to its leg with which it burrows into the sand, which is shares with other Yllenines species. It is similar to other Yllenus spiders, particularly Yllenus charynensis, but differs in having a concave rear margin to the epigyne and the design of the spermathecal ducts and receptacles.

== Distribution and habitat ==
The species is endemic to Mongolia. The female holotype for the species was found in the Jarantai in 1975. The site is a military station near the Chinese border on the Bulgan Gol river. The species thrives in semi-desert areas that have a semi-arid climate.
