= Leptorchestes algerinus =

Scientific classification
- Kingdom: Animalia
- Phylum: Arthropoda
- Subphylum: Chelicerata
- Class: Arachnida
- Order: Araneae
- Infraorder: Araneomorphae
- Family: Salticidae
- Genus: Leptorchestes
- Species: L. algerinus

Binomial name
- Leptorchestes algerinus Wesołowska & Szeremeta, 2001

Species of jumping spider

Leptorchestes algerinus is a jumping spider species in the genus Leptorchestes that lives in Algeria. The spider is small and resembles an ant, with a carapace that is typically 3.2 mm (0.13 in) long and an abdomen between 2.6 mm (0.10 in) long. Its carapace and the top of its abdomen are dark brown and its sternum and the bottom of its abdomen are light brown. It has a moderately long pedicel between its carapace and abdomen. Its mouthparts include its long brown chelicerae that has two teeth on their front margin and a row of hairs instead of teeth to the rear, dark patches on its labium and white patches on its maxillae. The male has a distinctive copulatory organs with a triangular bulge on its palpal bulb that is visible beyond its cymbium.. The female has not been described.

== Taxonomy ==
Leptorchestes algerinus is a species of jumping spider, a member of the family Salticidae, that was first described by the arachnologists Wanda Wesołowska and Małgorzata Szeremeta in 2001. They assigned the species to the genus Leptorchestes, first circumscribed by Tamerlan Thorell in 1870. In Wayne Maddison's 2015 study of spider phylogenetic classification, the genus Leptorchestes was allocated to the tribe Leptorchestini, named by Eugène Simon in 1901. The tribe is a member of the subclade Simonida in the clade Saltafresia in the subfamily Salticinae. In 2016, Jerzy Prószyński added the genus to a group of genera named Menemerines, named after the genus Menemerus alongside Kima. Genetic analysis has confirmed that is also related to Paramarpissa and Yllenus.

== Description ==
Leptorchestes are relatively small ant-like spiders. Their body is divided into two main parts: a cephalothorax and an abdomen. The male carapace, the hard upper part of the cephalothorax, is a dark brown oval that is typically 3.2 mm (0.13 in) long and 1.3 mm (0.05 in) wide. There are a few short greyish-brown hairs on its back and long bristles near its first row of eyes. The underside of its cephalothorax, or sternum, is a wide light brown oval. The spider's clypeus is low and dark browns. Its mouthparts are distinctive. It has long brown chelicerae that have two teeth on their front front margin and a row of hairs instead of teeth to the rear. Its labium is dark brown and wide with dark patches visible on the sides and its maxillae, are light brown with white patches of its inside edge.

The male's abdomen is typically 2.6 mm (0.10 in) long and 1.4 mm (0.06 in) wide. It is a dark brown oval that is fatter near the back with a gently rounded end. It has a narrower part in the middle that is marked with a line of white hairs that stretches around to the light brown underside of the abdomen. It is otherwise covered in brown and grey hairs. The spider has large book lung covers that show evidence of sclerotization. It has a moderately long pedicel between its carapace and abdomen. Its spinnerets and pedipalps are all brown. Its legs are long and thin, particularly the last pair of legs, which are longer than the rest, and covered in brown hairs. The first pair of legs are brown and marked with blackish streaks on their patellae. The second pair of legs are lighter, the remaining pairs having light brown metatarsi and tarsi.

The male spiders can be distinguished by their copulatory organs. The male has a meandering sperm duct inside its irregular-shaped, almost concave, palpal bulb that has a triangular bulge sticking out of the side and a very small embolus projecting from the top. At the bottom of the palpal bulb, there is also a large spike projecting from the palpal tibia, called a tibial apophysis, that follows the bottom of the bulb near to the cymbium. As with other members of Leptorchestes, Leptorchestes algerinus can be distinguished by its copulatory organs, particularly the shape of the male's palpal bulb and the way that the bulge extends beyond the edges of the cymbium.. The female has not been described.

== Distribution ==
Leptorchestes spiders live in the Afrotropical and Palearctic realms. Leptorchestes algerinus is endemic to Algeria, which is where its specific name comes from. The holotype was found in Ghazaouet. Leptorchestes species are typically ground-dwelling spiders.
