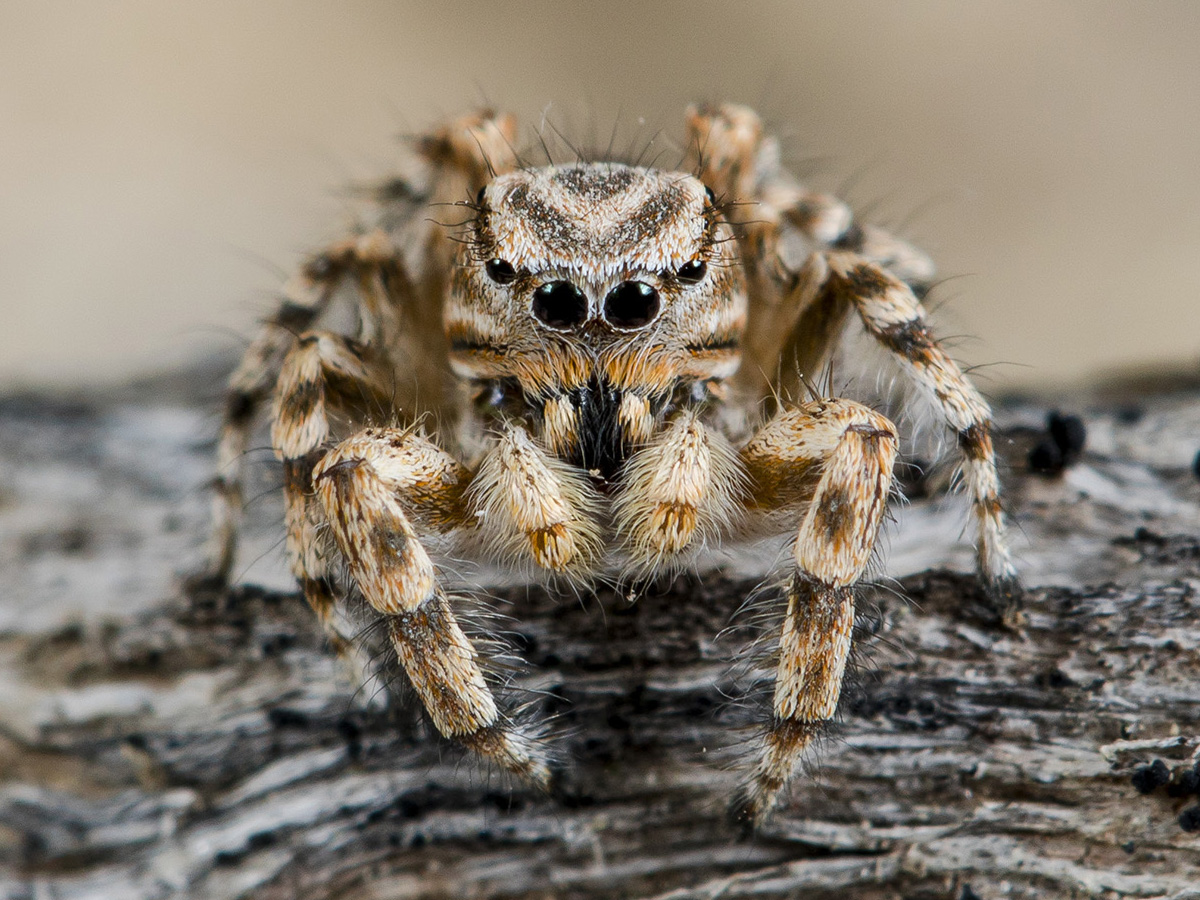
- Male Pseudomogrus guseinovi

Scientific classification
- Kingdom: Animalia
- Phylum: Arthropoda
- Subphylum: Chelicerata
- Class: Arachnida
- Order: Araneae
- Infraorder: Araneomorphae
- Family: Salticidae
- Genus: Pseudomogrus
- Species: P. guseinovi

Binomial name
- Pseudomogrus guseinovi (Logunov & Marusik, 2003)

Synonyms
- Yllenus guseinovi Logunov & Marusik, 2003; Logunyllus guseinovi (Logunov & Marusik, 2003); Pseudomogrus guseinovi (Logunov & Marusik, 2003)

= Pseudomogrus guseinovi =

Species of spider

Pseudomogrus guseinovi is a species of jumping spider in the genus Pseudomogrus that lives in Azerbaijan, Kazakhstan and Turkmenistan. It thrives in desert and semidesert environments, including the Repetek Biosphere State Reserve in the Karakum Desert. The species was first described by Dmitri Logunov and Yuru Marusik in 2003. They originally placed it in the genus Yllenus, but it was moved to the new genus Logunyllus in 2016, and then to its present designation in 2019. The spider is small, with a carapace that is between 2.13 and 2.63 mm long and an abdomen between 2.13 and 2.7 mm long. The female is larger than the male. The male has a distinctive white pattern on its body, including two white stripes and a white 'A' shape on its eye field. The female has a distinctive deep pocket in its epigyne that is shaped like the Greek letter Π. Other aspects of the female copulatory organs also help distinguish the spider from other members of the genus, including the shape of the insemination ducts and spermathecae.

== Taxonomy and etymology ==
Pseudomogrus guseinovi is a species of jumping spider, a member of the family Salticidae, that was first described by Dmitri Logunov and Yuru Marusik in 2003. It was initially allocated to the genus Yllenus with the name Yllenus guseinovi. The genus Yllenus had been first circumscribed by Eugène Simon in 1868. According to Wayne Maddison, it was related to Araegeus, Kima and Ugandinella. Particularly, genetic analysis confirmed that the genus was related to Leptorchestes and Paramarpissa, despite the different behaviours that these spiders exhibit and that some live in a completely different continent. The genus was allocated to the tribe Leptorchestini within the subclade Saltafresia in the clade Salticoida.

In 2016, Jerzy Prószyński circumscribed a new genus called Logunyllus, named in honour of Logunov. He moved the species to the genus on the basis of the shape of the copulatory organs. He placed the genus in a group named Yllenines, along with Yllenus and Marusyllus, based on the shape of the carapace and the existence of a scoop-like brush made of setae on the edge of the tarsus. In 2019, the genus Logunyllus was declared a junior synonym of Pseudomogrus and the species was given its current name. Pseudomogrus had been first circumscribed by Eugène Simon in 1937. The name of the genus recalls the unrelated genus Mogrus. The species is named for the arachnologist Elchin F. Guseinov who found the first example.

== Description ==
The spider is small. The male of the species has a carapace, the hard upper side of the cephalothorax, or forward section of the spider, that is typically 2.3 mm (0.09 in) long and 1.83 mm (0.07 in) wide. It is red-brown and covered with brown, orange and white scales. White scales also form a pattern of two white stripes that stretch from the front to back and a shape like an 'A' on the spider's eye field. The underside of the cephalothorax, or sternum, is brownish yellow and has dark brown area to its edges. The spider's face, or clypeus, is yellowish and is covered with reddish scales and hairs. The spider has distinctive mouthparts with brownish chelicerae while the labium and maxilae are yellow.

Behind the cephalothorax, the spider has an abdomen that measures typically 2.13 mm (0.08 in) long and is typically 1.73 mm (0.07 in) wide. It is whitish on top with pattern consisting of three wide brown stripes visible stretching from the front to back. The sides and bottom of the abdomen are yellowish-white. Its spinnerets are also yellowish-white. The legs are yellow with brown patches and rings, apart from the front pair, which have contrasting yellow tibiae, brown metatarsi and dark brown tarsi. The pedipalps are similarly contrasting.

The female is slightly larger than the male, having a carapace that is typically 2.63 mm (0.10 in) long and 2.2 mm (0.09 in) wide and an abdomen that has a typical length of 2.7 mm (0.11 in) and a width of 2.1 mm (0.08 in). It is otherwise similar to the male, differing in details. Its carapace is plainer and lacks the white pattern on the male. The clypeus and mouthparts are similar, but its clypeus differs in being covered in dense white hairs. Its legs and pedipalps are completely yellow.

The spider's copulatory organs are unusual. The male palpal tibia has two spikes, or tibial apophyses. One is long and hook-shaped; the other is shorter and cone-shaped. There is a small ridge-like protuberance on the cymbium. The palpal bulb is concealed within the cymbium, with the straight embolus emanating from its side. This is accompanied by a smaller appendage, called a terminal apophysis. The female has a pocket positioned towards the front of its epigyne that is shaped like the Greek letter Π. There are two rounded copulatory openings that lead via short and wide insemination ducts to large simple egg-shaped spermathecae, or receptacles.

The spider is often confused with other species in the genus. For example, the first instance seen in Kazakstan was originally considered to be a member of the species Pseudomogrus albocinctus. Similarly, Logunov and Marisk considered the specimen of Pseudomogrus univittatus found in Turkmenistan in 1996 by Wanda Wesołowska to be another example of this species. The spider is closely related to the latter, along with the Pseudomogrus vittatus and Pseudomogrus zhilgaensis. The males can be distinguished by the pattern on the carapace and legs, particularly the white stripes and 'A'-shaped pattern. The females have a deeper pocket in the epigyne and the position of the copulatory openings is different. The female is particularly easily confused with the related Pseudomogrus tamdybulak, but can be distinguished by its wider epigynal pocket and the proportions of the insemination ducts and spermathecae. All these species were originally members of Yllenus and subsequently moved to Pseudomogrus.

== Distribution and habitat ==
The genus Pseudomogrus has a wide distribution ranging from the Canary Islands to western Mongolia and the western regions of China, and has been observed living in Europe and North Africa as well as India. It is particularly common in Central Asia. Pseudomogrus guseinovi has been identified in Azerbaijan, Kazakhstan and Turkmenistan. It was first discovered in Azerbaijan, the holotype being found on the Absheron Peninsula near Dübəndi in 1999, while others were found in areas across the Baku district. A male was subsequently found in the Shirvanskii Reserve, Salyan District, in 2000, proving that the species has a wider distribution across the country. Meanwhile, the first example to be found in Turkmenistan was a female found in the Repetek Biosphere State Reserve in the Karakum Desert in 1967. The first Pseudomogrus guseinovi from Kazakstan was a male collected on Barsa-Kelmes, then an island in the Aral Sea, in 1983.

The spider thrives in deserts and semideserts. It seems to particularly thrive in areas where there is limited coverage by species of the Haloxylon genus of shrubs and small trees. It is particularly active in May and June, with hatching occurring in July. It will live in areas where the spider Thanatus fabricii can be found, on which it will often prey.
