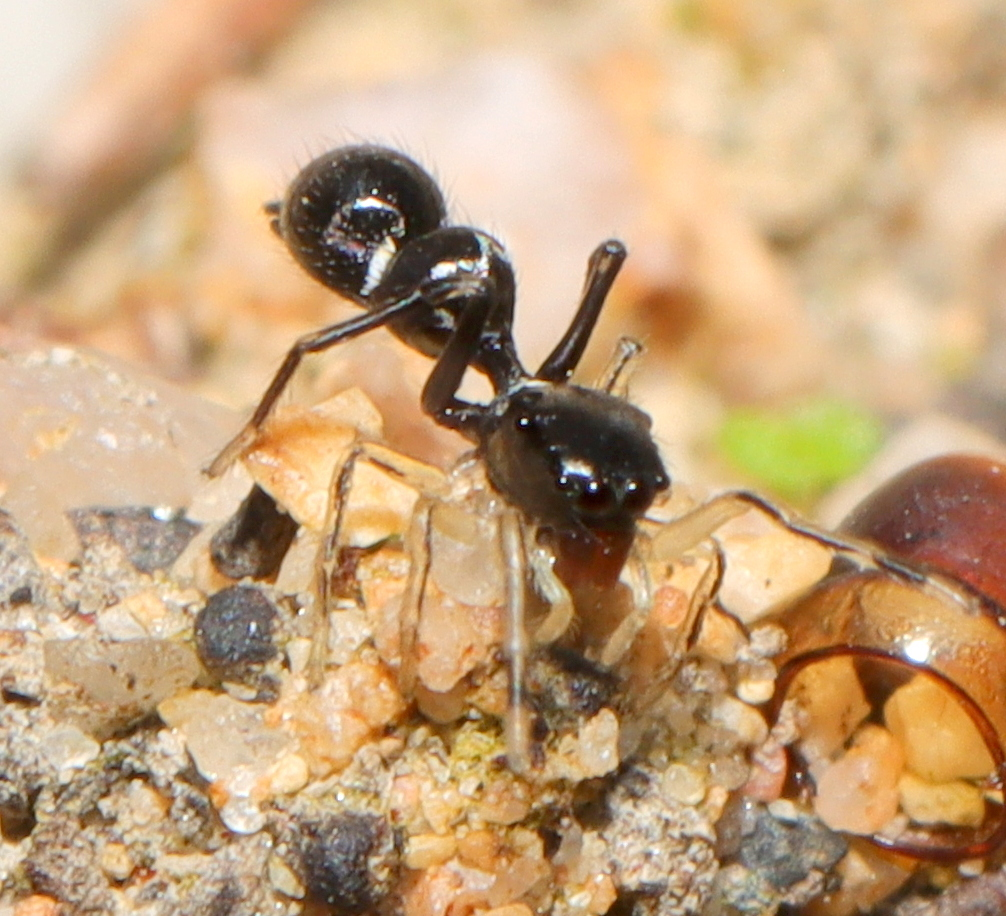

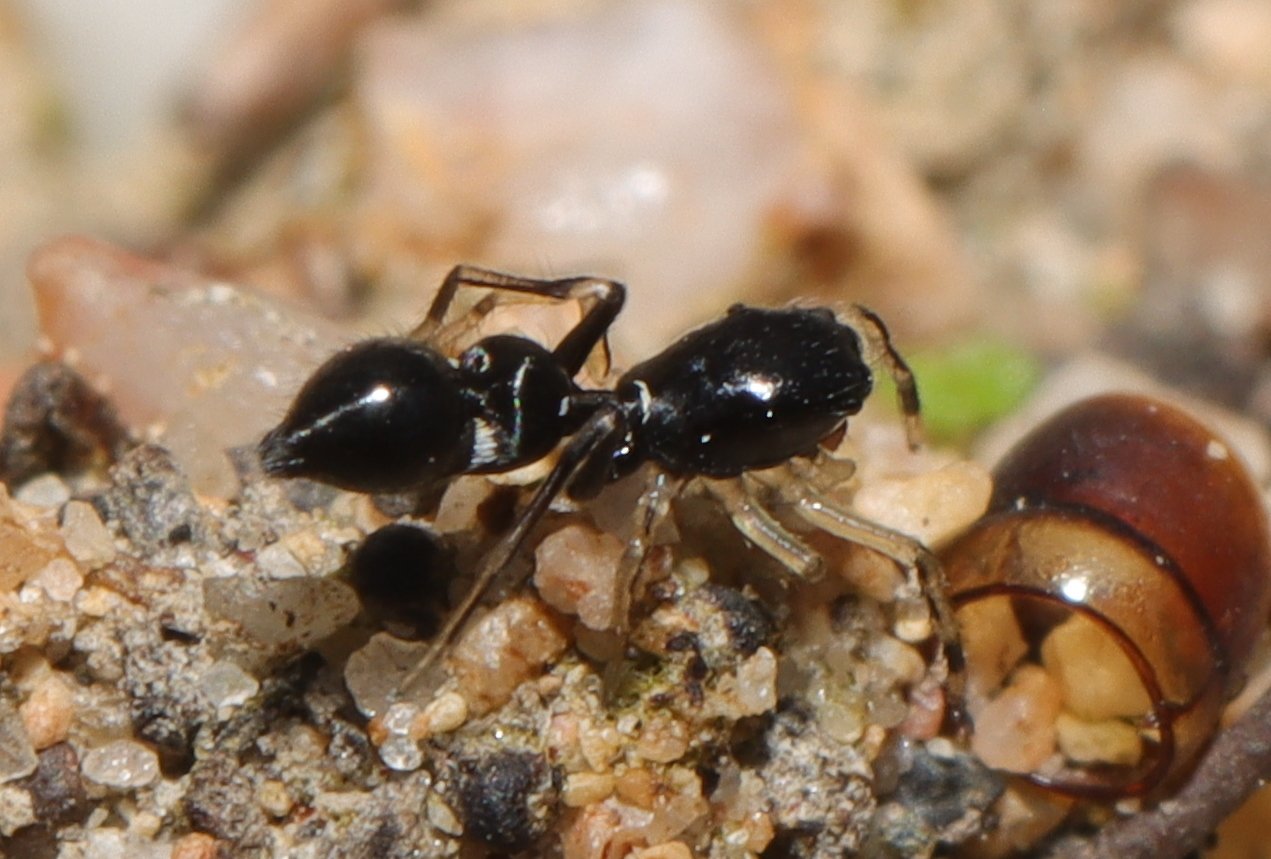

Scientific classification
- Kingdom: Animalia
- Phylum: Arthropoda
- Subphylum: Chelicerata
- Class: Arachnida
- Order: Araneae
- Infraorder: Araneomorphae
- Family: Salticidae
- Genus: Kima
- Species: K. atra

Binomial name
- Kima atra Wesołowska & Russell-Smith, 2000

= Kima atra =

Species of jumping spider

Kima atra is a species of jumping spider from in Tanzania. It was first described in 2000 and has been found in grasslands, woodlands and a wasp's nest. The spider is large and resembles an ant, with a carapace between 2.7 and 3 mm (0.11 and 0.12 in) long and an abdomen between 2.8 and 4 mm (0.11 and 0.16 in) long. The female has a larger abdomen than the male. It is otherwise very similar, both being mainly dark brown to black on top and black, or nearly black, underneath, apart from two lines of white dots on the underside of the abdomen. It is very similar to other spider's in the genus apart from the existence of a line of fine hairs rather than teeth on the back of its chelicerae. It is most easily distinguished by its copulatory organs. The male has a palpal bulb that is particularly wide and contains sperm ducts that run along its edge. The female has a notch on the back of its epigyne and two rounded copulatory openings.

== Taxonomy and etymology ==
Kima atra is a species of jumping spider, a member of the family Salticidae, that was first described by the arachnologists Wanda Wesołowska and Anthony Russell-Smith in 2000. The species was allocated to the genus Kima, first circumscribed by George W. and Elizabeth G. Peckham in 1902. The genus is related to Araegeus and Leptorchestes.

Kima was allocated to the tribe Leptorchestini, named by Eugène Simon in 1901. The tribe is a member of the subclade Simonida in the clade Saltafresia in the subfamily Salticinae. In 2016, Jerzy Prószyński added the genus to a group of genera named Menemerines, named after the genus Menemerus. The genus Leptorchestes is also a member of the group. The specific name is a Latin word that can be translated 'black'.

== Description ==
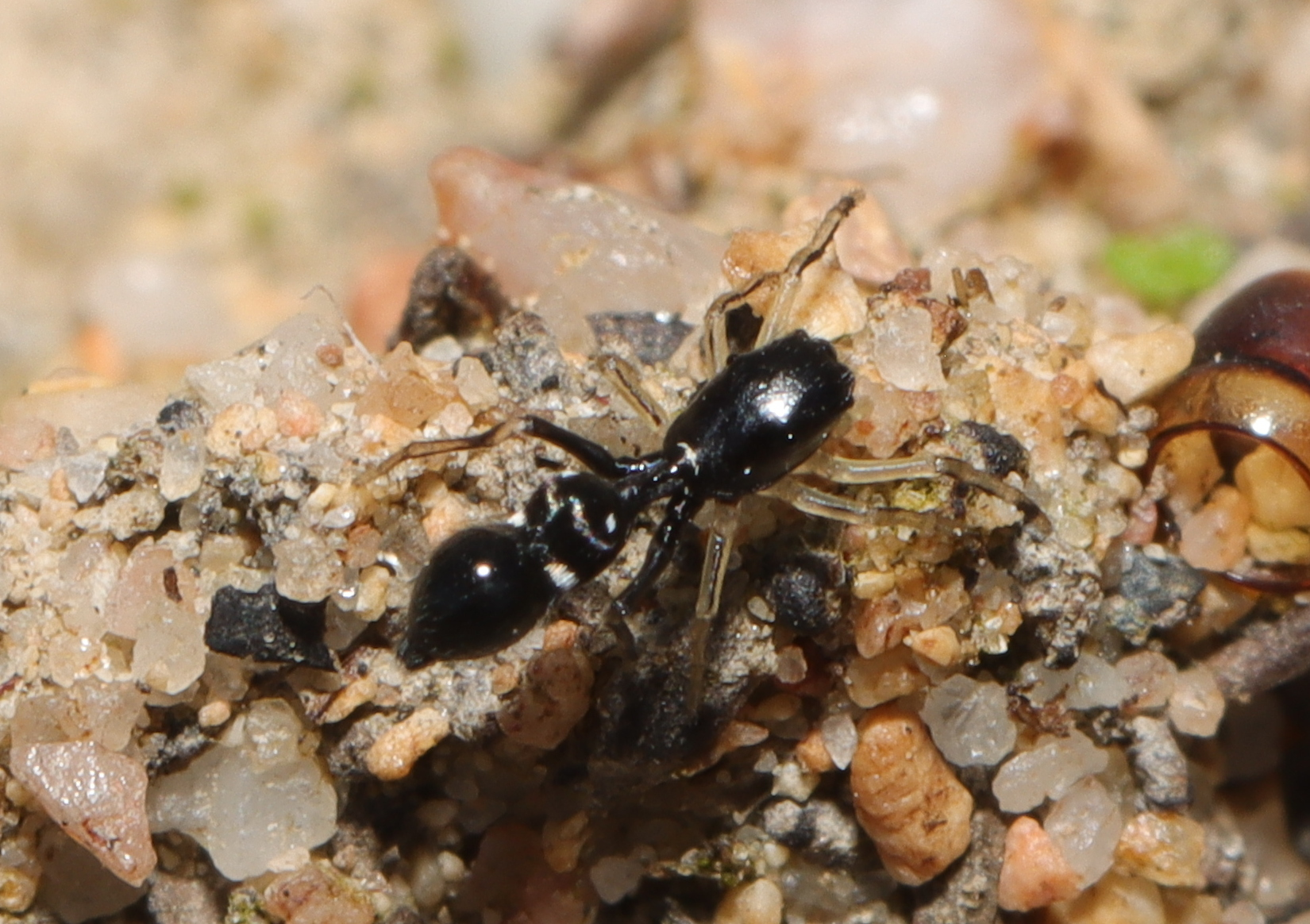

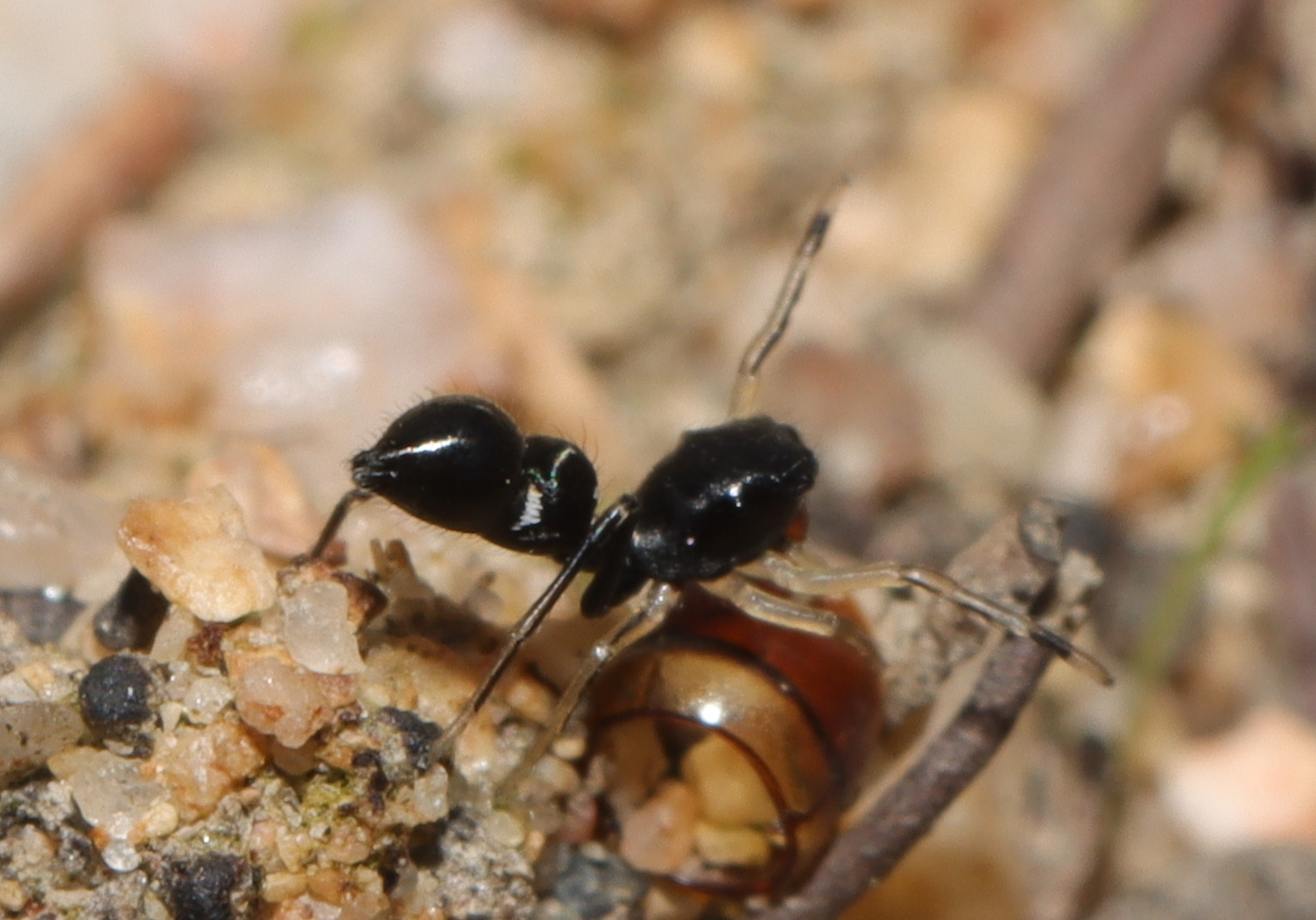

Kima are large ant-like spiders. Their body is divided into two main parts: a cephalothorax and an abdomen. Kima atra has an elongated carapace, the hard upper part of the cephalothorax, that is between 2.7 and 3 mm (0.11 and 0.12 in) in length and between 1.5 and 1.6 mm (0.06 and 0.06 in) in width. It is dark brown to black and covered in short hairs. Its eye field is punctured and there are long bristles near the eyes themselves. The underside of the cephalothorax, or sternum, is brown, nearly black. The part of the spider's face known as the clypeus is low and has bristles that stick out to the front. The spider has a long chelicerae that has two teeth towards the front. Unlike other species, there are no teeth at the back but instead there is a row of fine hairs. The remainder of the mouthparts,, including its labium and maxillae are brown.

The spider's abdomen is elongated like the carapace but bulging with a taper inwards in the middle. The male's abdomen ranges between 2.8 and 3.3 mm (0.11 and 0.13 in) in length and has a typical width of 1.9 mm (0.07 in), while the female spider has an abdomen that is larger at 4 mm (0.16 in) long and 2.1 mm (0.08 in) wide. Its topside is dark brown, nearly black, and covered in brilliant hairs and its underside is black with lighter dots forming two lines running from the front to the back. The spider's book lung covers show strong evidence of sclerotization. Its forward spinnerets are yellowish-grey; the others are black. Its legs are long, particularly the femur, the front two pairs of legs being brown and yellowish-grey and the back legs generally black. There is a long pedicel that connects between the carapace and the abdomen.

The spider is hard to distinguish from its relatives externally. Indeed, Wayne Maddison noted that photographs of the species had been mistaken for Araegeus mimicus, a member of a different genus. As with other members of Kima, Kima atra can be distinguished by its copulatory organs. The male has brown pedipalps. There is a flattened projection called a tibial apophysis on the slightly swollen palpal tibia that is longer than related species. At the top of the tegulum is a very fine stiletto-like embolus. It has sperm ducts that run along the edge of the palpal bulb, which is wider than it long. The female has evidence of very strong sclerotization on its epigyne, the external visible part of its copulatory organs, which is marked by a notch towards the rear. It has round copulatory openings and accessory glands that connect to the insemination ducts about half way along their length.

== Distribution and habitat ==
Kima spiders live in the Afrotropical realm. Kima alta is endemic to Tanzania. The first examples, including the male holotype, were discovered in Mkomazi National Park in 1994. They were found living amongst grasses and amongst woodland dominated by Senegalia senegal trees. They have also been observed in areas where humans live and in a wasps' nest.
