= Kima montana =

Scientific classification
- Kingdom: Animalia
- Phylum: Arthropoda
- Subphylum: Chelicerata
- Class: Arachnida
- Order: Araneae
- Infraorder: Araneomorphae
- Family: Salticidae
- Genus: Kima
- Species: K. montana

Binomial name
- Kima montana Wesołowska & Szeremeta, 2001

Species of jumping spider

Kima montana is a jumping spider species in the genus Kima that lives in Kenya. It was first found near a river at an altitude of 2,050 m (6,730 ft) above sea level on Mount Elgon. Only the female has been described. The spider is large and resembles an ant, with a carapace typically 3.6 mm (0.14 in) long and an abdomen 4.2 mm (0.17 in) long. It is generally dark brown, its sternum being so dark that it is nearly black, apart from its black eye field and the two white diagonal stripes on the bottom of its abdomen. There are long bristles sticking out from its clypeus. It is very similar to related species, particularly Kima reimoiser. To distinguish them, it is necessary to compare by their copulatory organs and particularly their spermathecae, which is this species has less chambers than the other.

== Taxonomy and etymology ==
Kima montana is a species of jumping spider, a member of the family Salticidae, that was first described by the arachnologists Wanda Wesołowska and Małgorzata Szeremeta in 2001. Its specific name is a Latin word that can be translated 'mountain'. The species was allocated to the genus Kima, first circumscribed by George W. and Elizabeth G. Peckham in 1902. The genus is related to Araegeus and Leptorchestes. Kima was allocated to the tribe Leptorchestini, named by Eugène Simon in 1901. The tribe is a member of the subclade Simonida in the clade Saltafresia in the subfamily Salticinae. In 2016, Jerzy Prószyński added the genus to a group of genera named Menemerines, named after the genus Menemerus. The genus Leptorchestes is also a member of the group.

== Description ==
Kima are large ant-like spiders. Their body is divided into two main parts: a cephalothorax and an abdomen. The female Kima montana has an elongated carapace, the hard upper part of the cephalothorax, that is typically 3.6 mm (0.14 in) long and between 1.8 mm (0.07 in) wide. It is dark brown apart from its eye field, which is black and elevated. A scattering of long bristles can be seen near the eyes and sticking out from the clypeus. The underside of the cephalothorax, or sternum, is nearly black. The remainder of the mouthparts, including its labium and maxillae, are brown with pale tips at the ends of the maxillae.

The female's abdomen is typically 4.2 mm (0.17 in) long and 2.5 mm (0.10 in) wide. It is elongated like the carapace, but also pear-shaped with a narrow part in the middle. Its topside is silky and dark brown, covered in delicate tan hairs, and its underside is darker with two narrow diagonal steaks formed of white hairs. The spider's forward spinnerets are yellowish; the others are brown. Its legs are long and thin, particularly the fourth pair of legs, They are generally brown although the front legs are darker and have yellow sections. They have a few long brown leg hairs. There is a long pedicel that connects between the carapace and the abdomen that has a small protuberance on the top.

The female has a crescent-shaped opening on its epigyne, the external visible part of its copulatory organs. There are two copulatory openings that are placed about halfway down the epigyne. These lead, via large and looping insemination ducts, to complex spermathecae, or receptacles, that have a few relatively large chambers. As with other members of the genus, Kima montana can be distinguished by its copulatory organs. The position of the copulatory openings and the small number of the chambers in the spermathecae are particularly distinctive. The otherwise similar Kima reimoiser has more chambers in its spermathecae.

== Distribution ==
Kima spiders live in the Afrotropical realm. Kima alta is endemic to Kenya. The female holotype was found on Mount Elgon in 1948, found near the Swam River on the track to Karamoja at an altitude of 1,700 m (5,600 ft) above sea level. The species has only been seen living in that area of the country.
