= Leptorchestes separatus =

Scientific classification
- Kingdom: Animalia
- Phylum: Arthropoda
- Subphylum: Chelicerata
- Class: Arachnida
- Order: Araneae
- Infraorder: Araneomorphae
- Family: Salticidae
- Genus: Leptorchestes
- Species: L. separatus

Binomial name
- Leptorchestes separatus Wesołowska & Szeremeta, 2001

Species of jumping spider

Leptorchestes separatus is a jumping spider species that lives in Namibia. It is the first spider in the genus Leptorchestes that was discovered in sub-Saharan Africa. Small and resembling an ant, the spider has a carapace that is between 1.3 and 1.5 mm (0.05 and 0.06 in) long and an abdomen between 2 and 2.3 mm (0.08 and 0.09 in) long. It is generally smaller than other species, particularly the female. Its carapace is flat and fawnish-grey and its sternum is light brown. The top of its pear-shaped abdomen is yellowish-brown at the front and black at the back, with the females having a light stripe between the two areas. It has a long pedicel between the carapace and abdomen of both sexes. There are long bristles sticking out from its clypeus. The female has significant sclerotization around the copulatory openings in its epigyne and wide insemination ducts. The male has a small embolus and a small tibial apophysis.

== Taxonomy and etymology ==
Leptorchestes separatus is a species of jumping spider, a member of the family Salticidae, that was first described by the arachnologists Wanda Wesołowska and Małgorzata Szeremeta in 2001. They assigned the species to the genus Leptorchestes, first circumscribed by Tamerlan Thorell in 1870.

In Wayne Maddison's 2015 study of spider phylogenetic classification, the genus Leptorchestes was allocated to the tribe Leptorchestini, named by Eugène Simon in 1901. The tribe is a member of the subclade Simonida in the clade Saltafresia in the subfamily Salticinae. In 2016, Jerzy Prószyński added the genus to a group of genera named Menemerines, named after the genus Menemerus alongside Kima. Genetic analysis has confirmed that is also related to Paramarpissa and Yllenus. The specific name is a Latin word that can be translated 'separate' and relates to the distance between this species and all those that had been described before.

== Description ==
Leptorchestes separatus are small ant-like spiders. Their body is divided into two main parts: a cephalothorax and an abdomen. The male carapace, the hard upper part of the cephalothorax, is typically 1.3 mm (0.05 in) long and 0.9 mm (0.04 in) wide while the female is typically 1.5 mm (0.06 in) long and 0.8 mm (0.03 in) wide. It is fawnish-brown, very flat and has short hairs. Its eye field is pockmarked and there are a few long hairs and black rings around its eyes. The underside of the cephalothorax, or sternum, is light brown. The spider's clypeus is brown, very low and have long protruding bristles. It has long brown chelicerae. It has two teeth on its front The remainder of the mouthparts, including its labium and maxillae, are light brown.

The male's abdomen is typically 2 mm (0.08 in) long and 0.9 mm wide. It is pear-shaped and covered in a few short hairs with a top that is yellowish-brown at the front and black to the back, and a uniformly brownish underside. Its book lung covers are large. It has brown spinnerets and pedipalps. Its legs are long and thin, particularly the fourth pair of legs, They are generally light brown with dark stripes on the third and fourth pairs. There is a long pedicel that connects between the carapace and the abdomen, The female's abdomen is typically 2.3 mm (0.09 in) long and 0.9 mm wide. It is similar to the male abdomen but the top has a distinctive stripe of white hairs between the lighter front and darker back sections. Unlike the male, it has light brown legs with the front pair differing in the presence of a dark stripe.

The male and female spiders can also be distinguished by their copulatory organs. There are two rounded copulatory openings, surrounded by areas of significant sclerotization, on its epigyne, the external visible part of its copulatory organs. These lead, via wide insemination ducts, to compact spermathecae, or receptacles, that have a many chambers. The male has an oval, somewhat elongated palpal bulb, which has a small embolus projecting from the top. There is also a single small spike projecting from the palpal tibia, called a tibial apophysis. As with other members of Leptorchestes, Leptorchestes separatus can be distinguished by its copulatory organs, particularly the male's short tibial apophysis. The female is most easily idenitified by its smaller size than others in the genus. The sclerotization of area around its copulatory openings and structure of the insemination ducts are also characteristic for the species.

== Distribution ==
Leptorchestes spiders live in the Afrotropical and Palearctic realms. Leptorchestes separatus was the first species in the genus to be found in sub-Saharan Africa. It is endemic to Namibia, the first examples being found in Etosha National Park in 1998. Leptorchestes species are typically ground-dwelling spiders.
