= Enoplomischus spinosus =

Scientific classification
- Kingdom: Animalia
- Phylum: Arthropoda
- Subphylum: Chelicerata
- Class: Arachnida
- Order: Araneae
- Infraorder: Araneomorphae
- Family: Salticidae
- Genus: Enoplomischus
- Species: E. spinosus

Binomial name
- Enoplomischus spinosus Wesołowska, 2005

Species of spider

Enoplomischus spinosus is a species of jumping spider.

== Name ==
The specific name means "thorny" in Latin and refers to the process on the pedicel.

== Distribution ==
Enoplomischus spinosus is only known from Kenya.
