= Enoplomischus pulcher =

Scientific classification
- Kingdom: Animalia
- Phylum: Arthropoda
- Subphylum: Chelicerata
- Class: Arachnida
- Order: Araneae
- Infraorder: Araneomorphae
- Family: Salticidae
- Genus: Enoplomischus
- Species: E. pulcher

Binomial name
- Enoplomischus pulcher Wiśniewski & Wesołowska, 2024

Species of jumping spider

Enoplomischus pulcher is a species of jumping spider in the genus Enoplomischus that lives in Uganda.
