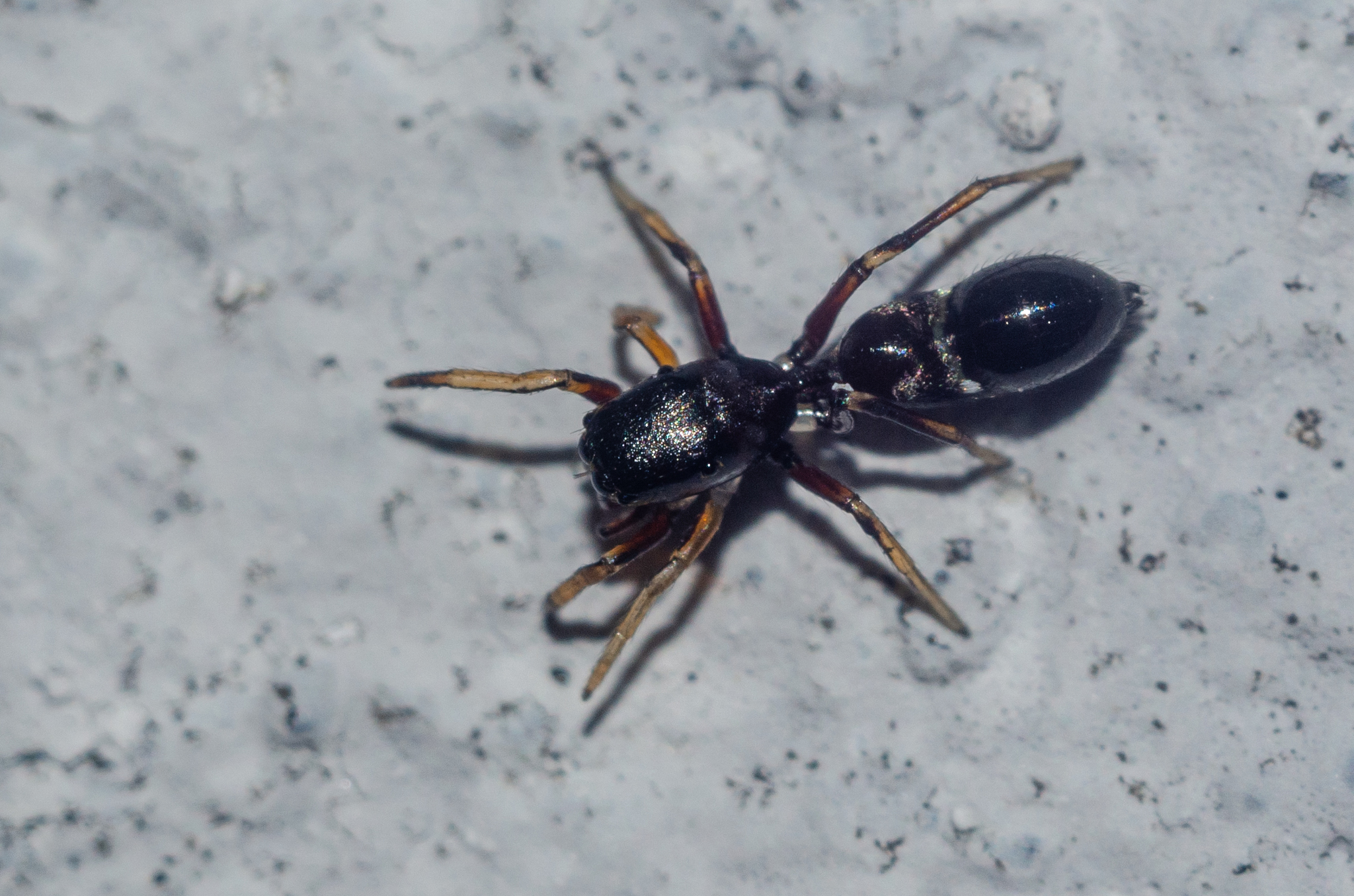

Scientific classification
- Kingdom: Animalia
- Phylum: Arthropoda
- Subphylum: Chelicerata
- Class: Arachnida
- Order: Araneae
- Infraorder: Araneomorphae
- Family: Salticidae
- Genus: Leptorchestes
- Species: L. berolinensis

Binomial name
- Leptorchestes berolinensis C. L. Koch, 1846

= Leptorchestes berolinensis =

Species of arachnid

Leptorchestes berolinensis is a species of jumping spider of the genus Leptorchestes. It can be found from Europe to Turkmenistan. It was first described in 1846.

male

female
