= Araegeus mimicus =

Makapan Araegeus Jumping Spider

Scientific classification
- Kingdom: Animalia
- Phylum: Arthropoda
- Subphylum: Chelicerata
- Class: Arachnida
- Order: Araneae
- Infraorder: Araneomorphae
- Family: Salticidae
- Genus: Araegeus
- Species: A. mimicus

Binomial name
- Araegeus mimicus Simon, 1901

Species of spider

Araegeus mimicus is a species of jumping spider in the family Salticidae. It is endemic to South Africa and is commonly known as the Makapan Araegeus jumping spider.

== Distribution ==
Araegeus mimicus is found only in South Africa, where it is known only from Makapan in the Limpopo province.

== Habitat and ecology ==
The species was sampled from a cave in the Savanna Biome at an altitude of 1038 m.

== Conservation ==
The species is listed as Data Deficient for taxonomic reasons. Placement of the species is problematic, as it has never been recollected or redescribed.

== Taxonomy ==
Araegeus mimicus was described by Eugène Simon in 1901 from Makapan in Limpopo. The species has not been revised and is known only from the female.
