= Enoplomischus =

Scientific classification
- Kingdom: Animalia
- Phylum: Arthropoda
- Subphylum: Chelicerata
- Class: Arachnida
- Order: Araneae
- Infraorder: Araneomorphae
- Family: Salticidae
- Subfamily: Salticinae
- Genus: Enoplomischus; Giltay, 1931

Type species
- E. ghesquierei Giltay, 1931

Species
- 3, see text

Genus of spiders

Enoplomischus is a genus of African jumping spiders that was first described by L. Giltay in 1931. It has a large, spike-like process on its pedicel that probably mimics a similar spike present in the anterior part of the abdomen of Odontomachus ants after which these spiders seem to be modeled.

== Species ==
As of January 2026, this genus includes three species:

- Enoplomischus formiculus (Wesołowska, 2006) – Central African Republic, Uganda
- Enoplomischus ghesquierei Giltay, 1931 – Ivory Coast, DR Congo, Uganda, Kenya
- Enoplomischus pulcher Wiśniewski & Wesołowska, 2024 – Uganda
