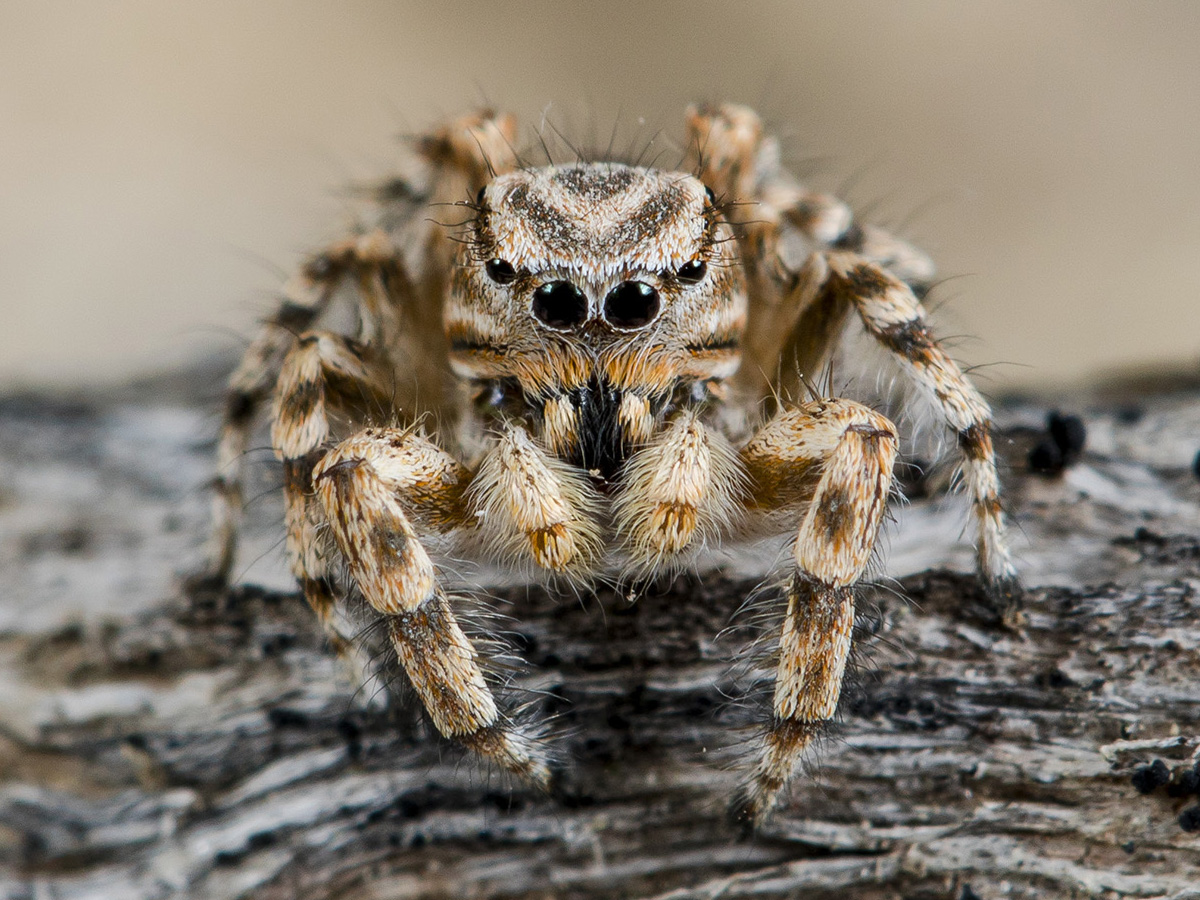
- Male Pseudomogrus guseinovi in Almaty Region, Kazakhstan

Scientific classification
- Kingdom: Animalia
- Phylum: Arthropoda
- Subphylum: Chelicerata
- Class: Arachnida
- Order: Araneae
- Infraorder: Araneomorphae
- Family: Salticidae
- Subfamily: Salticinae
- Genus: Pseudomogrus; Simon, 1937

Type species
- P. univittatus (Simon, 1871)

Species
- See text.

Synonyms
- Logunyllus Prószyński, 2016

= Pseudomogrus =

Genus of spiders

Pseudomogrus is a genus of jumping spiders first described by Eugène Simon in 1937.

== Taxonomy ==
First described by Eugène Simon in 1937, Pseudomogrus was synonymized with Yllenus by Jerzy Prószyński in 1968. In 2016, Prószyński erected a new genus, Logunyllus, for some species of Yllenus. Logunyllus was declared a junior synonym of Pseudomogrus in 2019.

Under the synonym Logunyllus, Prószyński placed the genus in his informal group "yllenines", with Yllenus as a representative genus. In Maddison's 2015 classification of the family Salticidae, Yllenus is placed in the tribe Leptorchestini, part of the Salticoida clade of the subfamily Salticinae.

=== Species ===
As of September 2020 it contained the following species:

- Pseudomogrus albifrons (Lucas, 1846) — North Africa, Middle East
- Pseudomogrus albocinctus (Kroneberg, 1875) — Turkey to China
- Pseudomogrus algarvensis (Logunov & Marusik, 2003) — Portugal
- Pseudomogrus auriceps (Denis, 1966) — Libya
- Pseudomogrus bactrianus (Andreeva, 1976) — Tajikistan
- Pseudomogrus bakanas (Logunov & Marusik, 2003) — Kazakhstan
- Pseudomogrus bucharaensis (Logunov & Marusik, 2003) — Uzbekistan, Kazakhstan
- Pseudomogrus caspicus (Ponomarev, 1978) — Russia (Europe), Azerbaijan, Kazakhstan, Turkmenistan
- Pseudomogrus dalaensis (Logunov & Marusik, 2003) — Kazakhstan
- Pseudomogrus dumosus Logunov & Schäfer, 2019 — Spain (Canary Islands)
- Pseudomogrus gavdos (Logunov & Marusik, 2003) — Canary Is., Algeria, Italy (Sardinia), Greece (Crete)
- Pseudomogrus guseinovi (Logunov & Marusik, 2003) — Azerbaijan, Kazakhstan, Turkmenistan
- Pseudomogrus halugim (Logunov & Marusik, 2003) — Israel
- Pseudomogrus improcerus (Wesolowska & van Harten, 1994) — Yemen
- Pseudomogrus knappi (Wesolowska & van Harten, 1994) — Sudan, Yemen
- Pseudomogrus logunovi (Wesolowska & van Harten, 2010) — United Arab Emirates
- Pseudomogrus mirabilis (Logunov & Marusik, 2003) — Uzbekistan, Turkmenistan
- Pseudomogrus mirandus (Wesolowska, 1996) — Turkmenistan
- Pseudomogrus nigritarsis (Logunov & Marusik, 2003) — Turkmenistan
- Pseudomogrus nurataus (Logunov & Marusik, 2003) — Uzbekistan
- Pseudomogrus pavlenkoae (Logunov & Marusik, 2003) — Kazakhstan
- Pseudomogrus pseudovalidus (Logunov & Marusik, 2003) — Kazakhstan, Turkmenistan
- Pseudomogrus ranunculus (Thorell, 1875) — Algeria
- Pseudomogrus saliens (O. Pickard-Cambridge, 1876) — North Africa, Saudi Arabia, Yemen
- Pseudomogrus salsicola (Simon, 1937) — France to Israel
- Pseudomogrus shakhsenem (Logunov & Marusik, 2003) — Turkmenistan
- Pseudomogrus squamifer (Simon, 1881) — Portugal, Spain
- Pseudomogrus tamdybulak (Logunov & Marusik, 2003) — Uzbekistan
- Pseudomogrus tschoni (Caporiacco, 1936) — Libya, Egypt, Israel, United Arab Emirates
- Pseudomogrus univittatus (Simon, 1871) — France, Turkey, possibly Turkmenistan
- Pseudomogrus validus (Simon, 1889) — Central Asia to Mongolia
- Pseudomogrus vittatus (Thorell, 1875) — Eastern Europe to Kazakhstan
- Pseudomogrus zaraensis (Logunov, 2009) — Turkey
- Pseudomogrus zhilgaensis (Logunov & Marusik, 2003) — Kazakhstan
