= Marusyllus =

Scientific classification
- Kingdom: Animalia
- Phylum: Arthropoda
- Subphylum: Chelicerata
- Class: Arachnida
- Order: Araneae
- Infraorder: Araneomorphae
- Family: Salticidae
- Subfamily: Salticinae
- Genus: Marusyllus; Prószyński, 2016

Diversity
- 19 species

Genus of spiders

Marusyllus is a genus of spiders in the family Salticidae, found in Russia, Central Asia, the Indian subcontinent and China.

== Taxonomy ==
The genus Marusyllus was erected by Jerzy Prószyński in 2016 when he split the genus Yllenus into three (the other genus being Logunyllus, now considered a synonym of Pseudomogrus). Prószyński placed the three genera in his informal group "yllenines". Yllenus sensu lato is placed in the tribe Leptorchestini, part of the Salticoida clade in the subfamily Salticinae.

=== Species ===
As of March 2017, the World Spider Catalog accepted the following species:

- Marusyllus aralicus (Logunov & Marusik, 2003) – Azerbaijan, Turkmenistan, Kazakhstan
- Marusyllus auspex (O. Pickard-Cambridge, 1885) – Pakistan, Mongolia, China
- Marusyllus bajan (Prószyński, 1968) – Mongolia, China
- Marusyllus bator (Prószyński, 1968) – Mongolia, China
- Marusyllus coreanus (Prószyński, 1968) – Russia, Central Asia, Korea, Mongolia
- Marusyllus gregoryi (Logunov, 2010) – India
- Marusyllus hamifer (Simon, 1895) (type species) – Mongolia
- Marusyllus kalkamanicus (Logunov & Marusik, 2000) – Kazakhstan, China
- Marusyllus karnai (Logunov & Marusik, 2003) – India
- Marusyllus kotchevnik (Logunov & Marusik, 2003) – Turkmenistan
- Marusyllus maoniuensis (Liu, Wang & Peng, 1991) – China
- Marusyllus mongolicus (Prószyński, 1968) – Russia, Central Asia, Mongolia
- Marusyllus murgabicus (Logunov & Marusik, 2003) – Tajikistan
- Marusyllus namulinensis (Hu, 2001) – China
- Marusyllus pamiricus (Logunov & Marusik, 2003) – Tajikistan
- Marusyllus pseudobajan (Logunov & Marusik, 2003) – China
- Marusyllus robustior (Prószyński, 1968) – China
- Marusyllus tuvinicus (Logunov & Marusik, 2000) – Russia
- Marusyllus uzbekistanicus (Logunov & Marusik, 2003) – Uzbekistan, Turkmenistan, Kazakhstan
