= Enoplomischus formiculus =

Scientific classification
- Kingdom: Animalia
- Phylum: Arthropoda
- Subphylum: Chelicerata
- Class: Arachnida
- Order: Araneae
- Infraorder: Araneomorphae
- Family: Salticidae
- Genus: Enoplomischus
- Species: E. formiculus

Binomial name
- Enoplomischus formiculus (Wesołowska, 2006)

Synonyms
- Ugandinella formicula Wesołowska, 2006

Species of spider

Enoplomischus formiculus is a species of spider in the family Salticidae.

== Distribution ==
Enoplomischus formiculus has been recorded from the Central African Republic and Uganda.

== Etymology ==
The species name refers to their appearance similar to members of Formicidae.
