= Yllenus =

Scientific classification
- Kingdom: Animalia
- Phylum: Arthropoda
- Subphylum: Chelicerata
- Class: Arachnida
- Order: Araneae
- Infraorder: Araneomorphae
- Family: Salticidae
- Subfamily: Salticinae
- Genus: Yllenus; Simon, 1868

Type species
- Y. arenarius Simon, 1868

Species
- 18, see text

Genus of spiders

Yllenus is a genus of jumping spiders that was first described by Eugène Louis Simon in 1868. Until 2019, it was considered a senior synonym of Pseudomogrus, and many of the species formerly placed here were transferred to new genera Logunyllus and Marusyllus by Jerzy Prószyński in 2016.

Y. arenarius is peculiar in building silken nests under the sand surface of sandy dunes it inhabits.

== Species ==
As of September 2019 it contains eighteen species, found from central Europe to China:

- Yllenus arenarius Simon, 1868 (type) – Central, Eastern Europe
- Yllenus baltistanus Caporiacco, 1935 – India
- Yllenus charynensis Logunov & Marusik, 2003 – Kazakhstan
- Yllenus desertus Wesolowska, 1991 – Mongolia
- Yllenus dunini Logunov & Marusik, 2003 – Azerbaijan, Kazakhstan
- Yllenus erzinensis Logunov & Marusik, 2003 – Russia, Mongolia
- Yllenus flavociliatus Simon, 1895 – Russia, Central Asia, Mongolia, China
- Yllenus gajdosi Logunov & Marusik, 2000 – Mongolia
- Yllenus horvathi Chyzer, 1891 – Hungary, Bulgaria, Romania, Ukraine
- Yllenus karakumensis Logunov & Marusik, 2003 – Turkmenistan
- Yllenus kononenkoi Logunov & Marusik, 2003 – Kyrgyzstan
- Yllenus kulczynskii Punda, 1975 – Mongolia
- Yllenus lyachovi Logunov & Marusik, 2000 – Russia (Europe), Kazakhstan
- Yllenus marusiki Logunov, 1993 – Mongolia
- Yllenus rotundiorificus Logunov & Marusik, 2000 – Mongolia
- Yllenus turkestanicus Logunov & Marusik, 2003 – Central Asia
- Yllenus uiguricus Logunov & Marusik, 2003 – Kazakhstan
- Yllenus zyuzini Logunov & Marusik, 2003 – Russia (Caucasus), Kazakhstan, Turkmenistan
