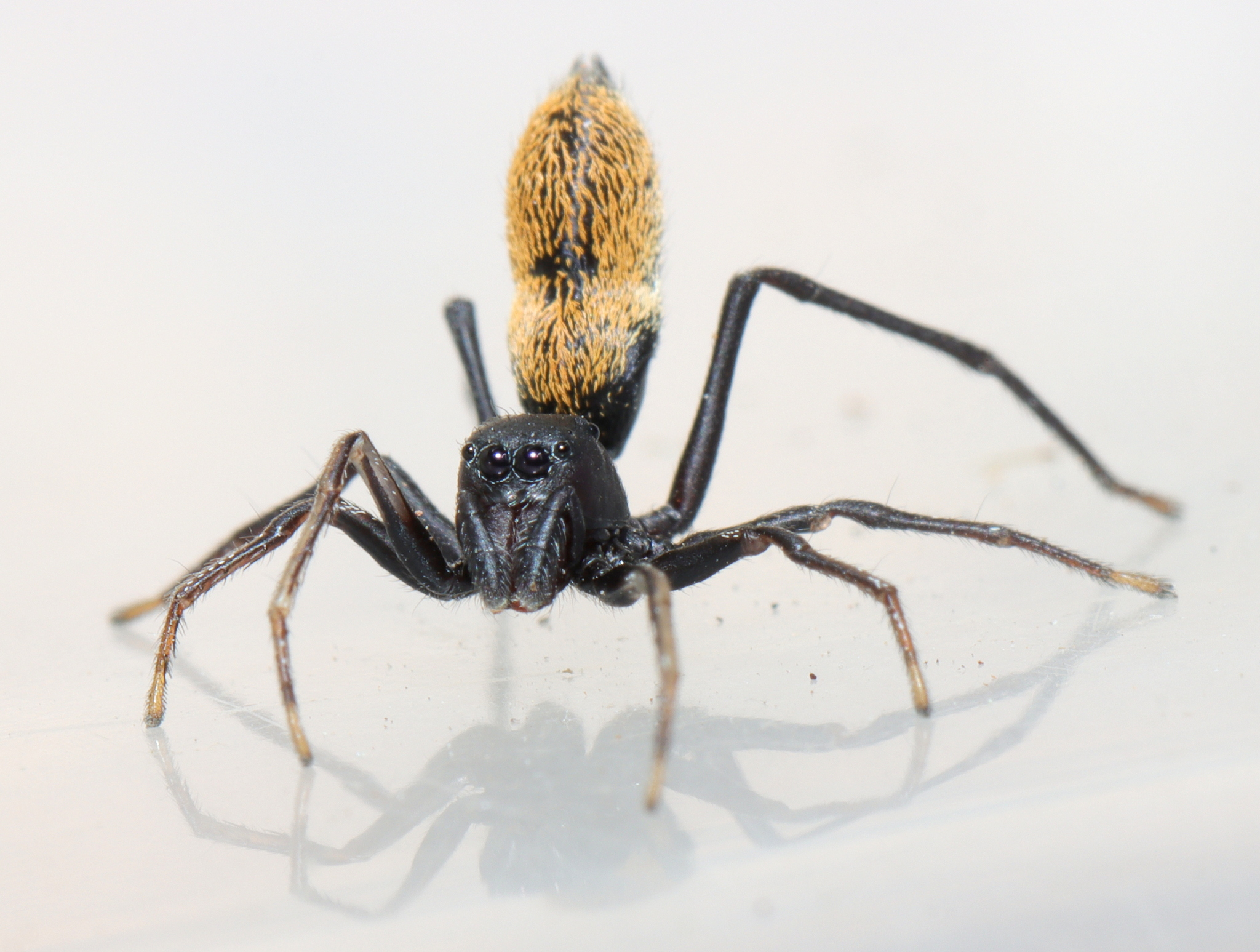
- female K. africana
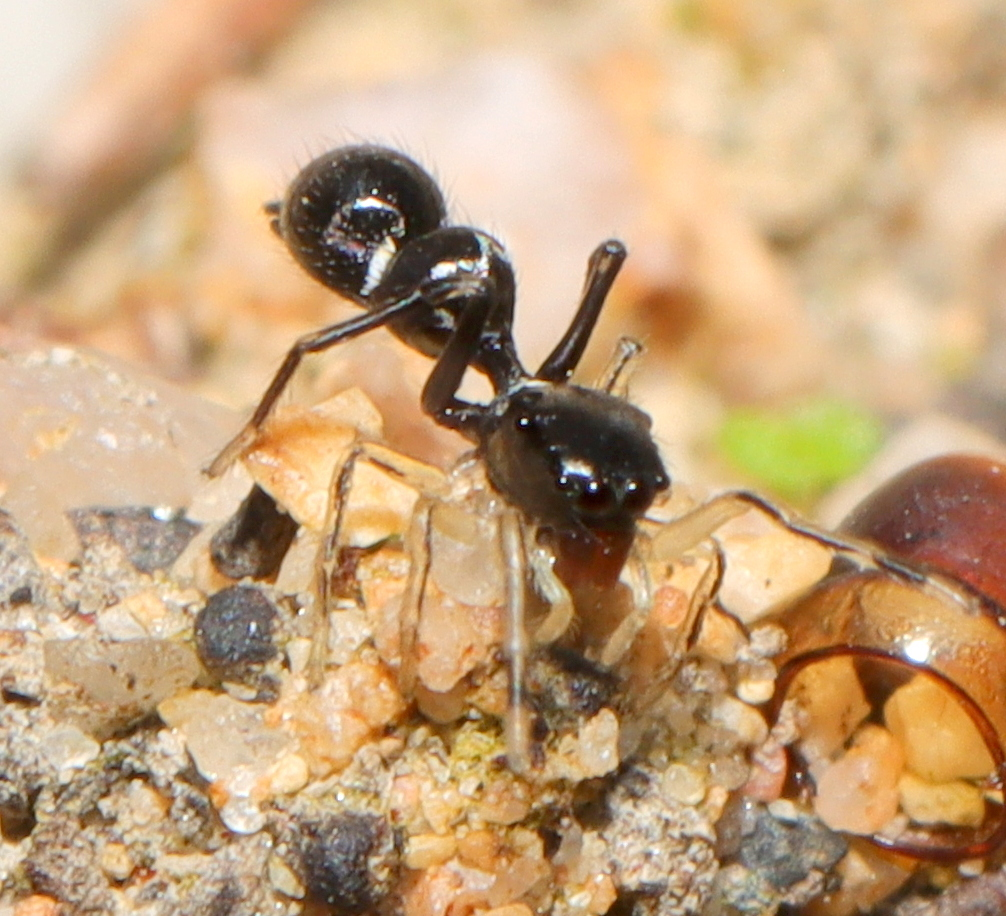
- K. atra

Scientific classification
- Kingdom: Animalia
- Phylum: Arthropoda
- Subphylum: Chelicerata
- Class: Arachnida
- Order: Araneae
- Infraorder: Araneomorphae
- Family: Salticidae
- Subfamily: Salticinae
- Genus: Kima; Peckham & Peckham, 1902

Type species
- Kima africana Peckham & Peckham, 1902

Species
- See text.

Diversity
- 5 species

= Kima (spider) =

Genus of spiders

Kima is an African genus of spiders in the family Salticidae (jumping spiders).

== Species ==
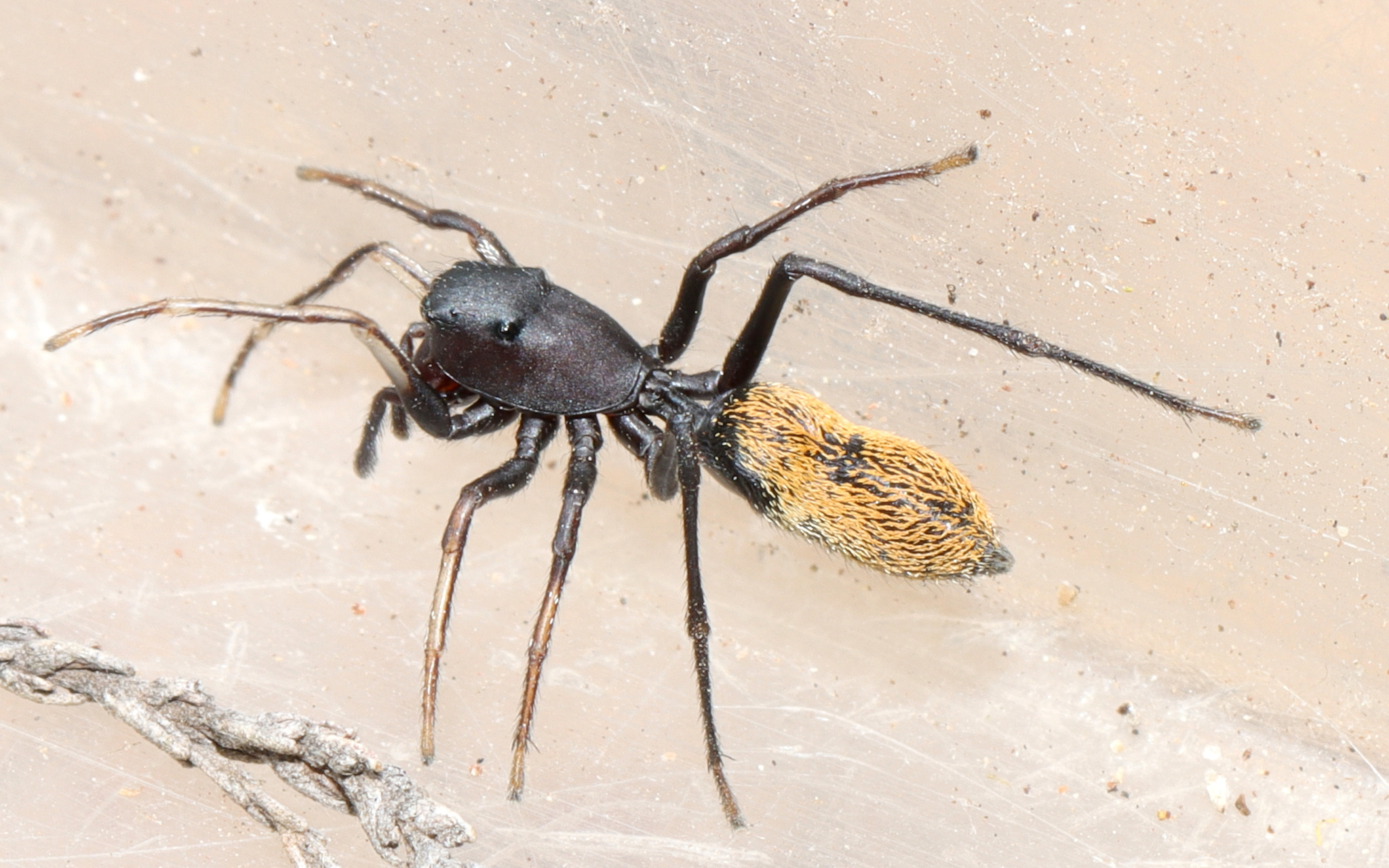
female K. africana

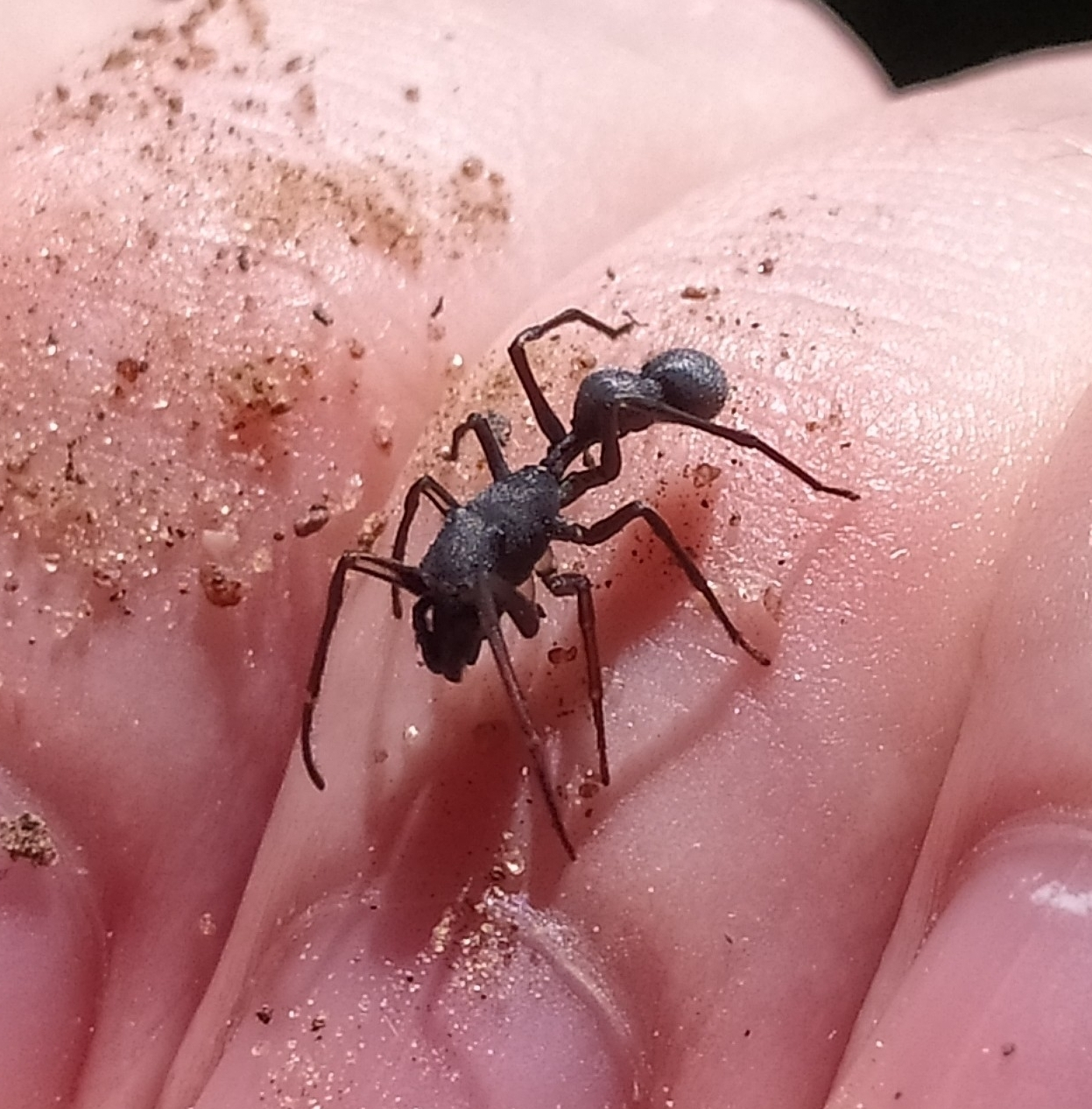
K. variabilis

As of October 2025, this genus includes five species:

- Kima africana G. W. Peckham & E. G. Peckham, 1902 – Namibia, Botswana, South Africa (type species)
- Kima atra Wesołowska & Russell-Smith, 2000 – Tanzania
- Kima montana Wesołowska & Szeremeta, 2001 – Kenya
- Kima reimoseri (Lessert, 1927) – DR Congo
- Kima variabilis G. W. Peckham & E. G. Peckham, 1903 – South Africa
