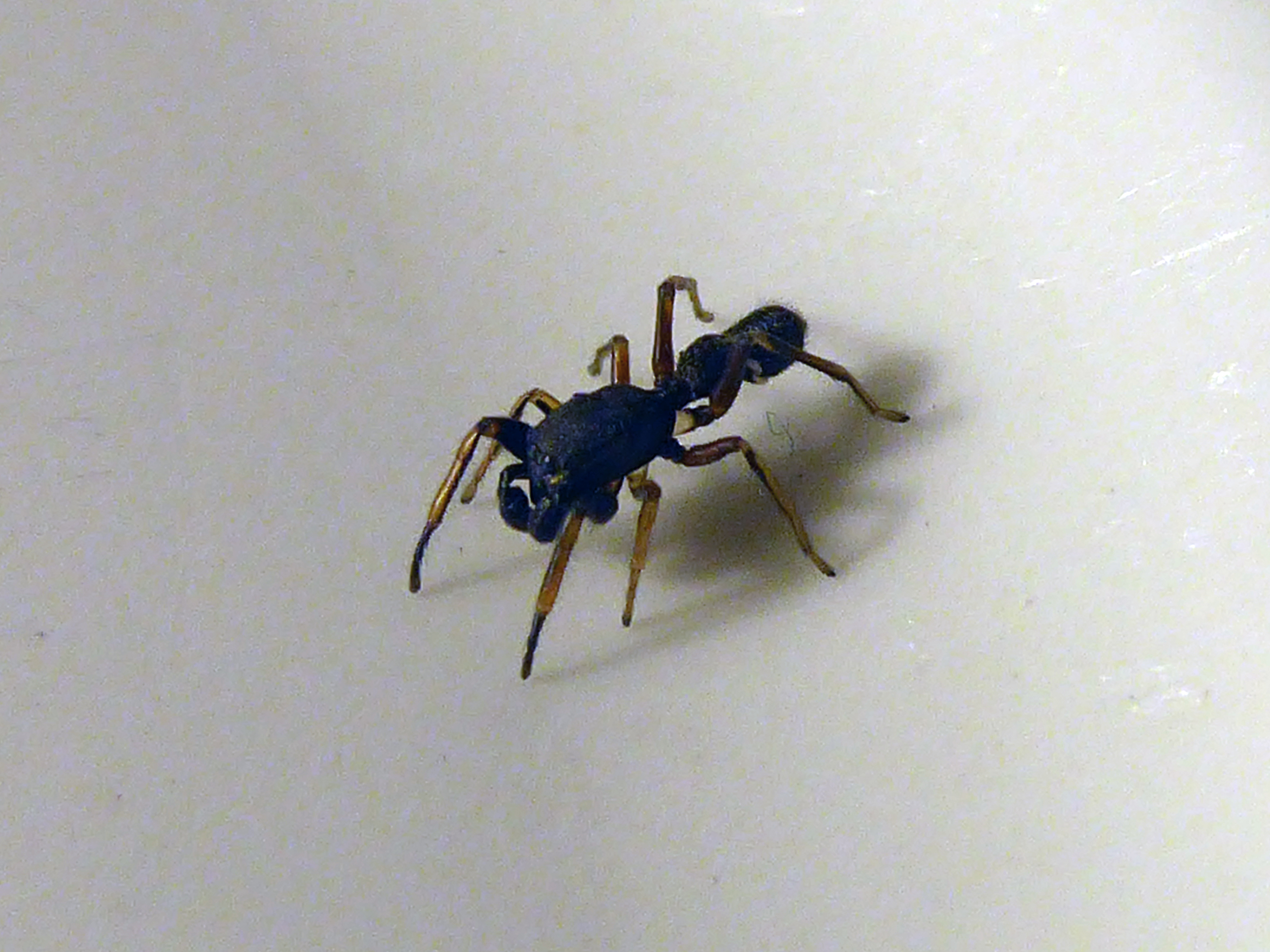
- Leptorchestes sp.

Scientific classification
- Kingdom: Animalia
- Phylum: Arthropoda
- Subphylum: Chelicerata
- Class: Arachnida
- Order: Araneae
- Infraorder: Araneomorphae
- Family: Salticidae
- Subfamily: Salticinae
- Genus: Leptorchestes; Thorell, 1870

Type species
- Salticus berolinensis C. L. Koch, 1846

Species
- See text.

= Leptorchestes =

Genus of spiders

Leptorchestes is a genus of jumping spiders in the family Salticidae. As in several other genera of salticids, it mimics ants.

== Species ==
- Leptorchestes algerinus Wesołowska & Szeremeta, 2001 – Algeria
- Leptorchestes berolinensis (C. L. Koch, 1846) – Europe to Turkmenistan
- Leptorchestes mutilloides (Lucas, 1846) – Southern Europe, Algeria
- Leptorchestes peresi (Simon, 1868) – Mediterranean
- Leptorchestes separatus Wesołowska & Szeremeta, 2001 – Namibia
- Leptorchestes sikorskii Prószyński, 2000 – Lebanon, Israel, Turkey, Bulgaria, Greece
