= Araegeus =

Scientific classification
- Kingdom: Animalia
- Phylum: Arthropoda
- Subphylum: Chelicerata
- Class: Arachnida
- Order: Araneae
- Infraorder: Araneomorphae
- Family: Salticidae
- Subfamily: Salticinae
- Genus: Araegeus; Simon, 1901

Type species
- A. mimicus Simon, 1901

Species
- A. fornasinii (Pavesi, 1881); A. mimicus Simon, 1901

Genus of spiders

Araegeus is a genus of southern African jumping spiders with two species. It was first described by Eugène Simon in 1901.

A. mimicus, endemic to Limpopo province in South Africa, is only known from the female described in 1901, and the species has never been recollected or redescribed.

== Description ==
Based on the description of Simon in 1901, the genus can be recognized by the very narrow sternum and four anterior coxae being subcontiguous.

The anterior tibia has 3-3 strong spines and the metatarsal segment has 2-2 spines. Single spines are present at the rear end of metatarsi of the legs.

== Taxonomy ==
This genus is known only from the original description.

== Species ==
As of October 2025, this genus includes two species:

- Araegeus fornasinii (Pavesi, 1881) – Mozambique
- Araegeus mimicus Simon, 1901 – South Africa (type species)
