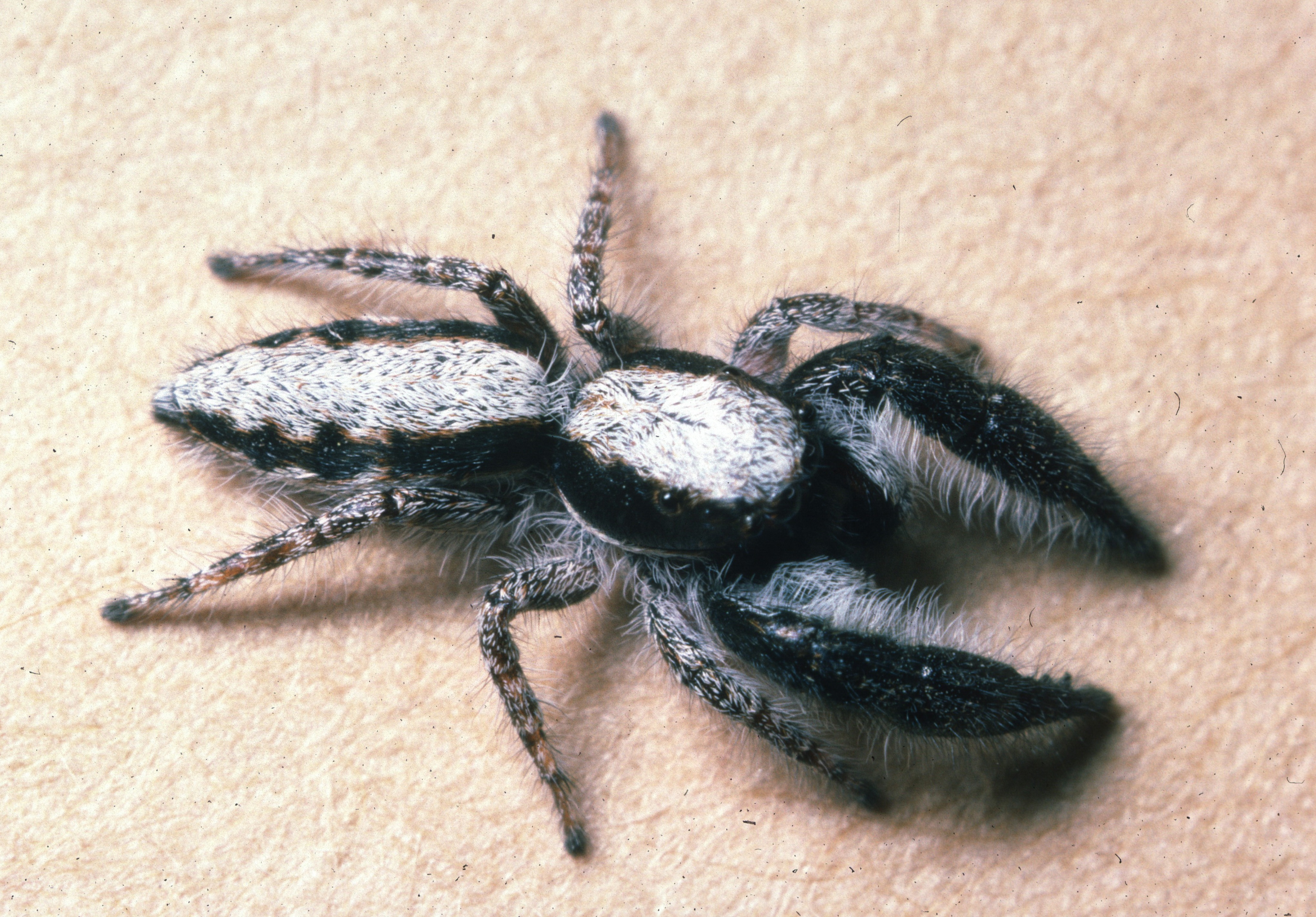
- Male Paramarpissa tibialis

Scientific classification
- Kingdom: Animalia
- Phylum: Arthropoda
- Subphylum: Chelicerata
- Class: Arachnida
- Order: Araneae
- Infraorder: Araneomorphae
- Family: Salticidae
- Subfamily: Salticinae
- Genus: Paramarpissa; F. O. Pickard-Cambridge, 1901

Type species
- P. tibialis F. O. Pickard-Cambridge, 1901

Species
- 6, see text

= Paramarpissa =

Genus of spiders

Paramarpissa is a genus of North American jumping spiders that was first described by Frederick Octavius Pickard-Cambridge in 1901. Originally considered a synonym of Pseudicius, it was separated into its own genus in 1999.

== Species ==
As of August 2019 it contains six species, found only in Mexico and the United States:

- Paramarpissa albopilosa (Banks, 1902) – USA, Mexico
- Paramarpissa griswoldi Logunov & Cutler, 1999 – USA, Mexico
- Paramarpissa laeta Logunov & Cutler, 1999 – Mexico
- Paramarpissa piratica (Peckham & Peckham, 1888) – USA, Mexico
- Paramarpissa sarta Logunov & Cutler, 1999 – Mexico
- Paramarpissa tibialis F. O. Pickard-Cambridge, 1901 (type) – Mexico
