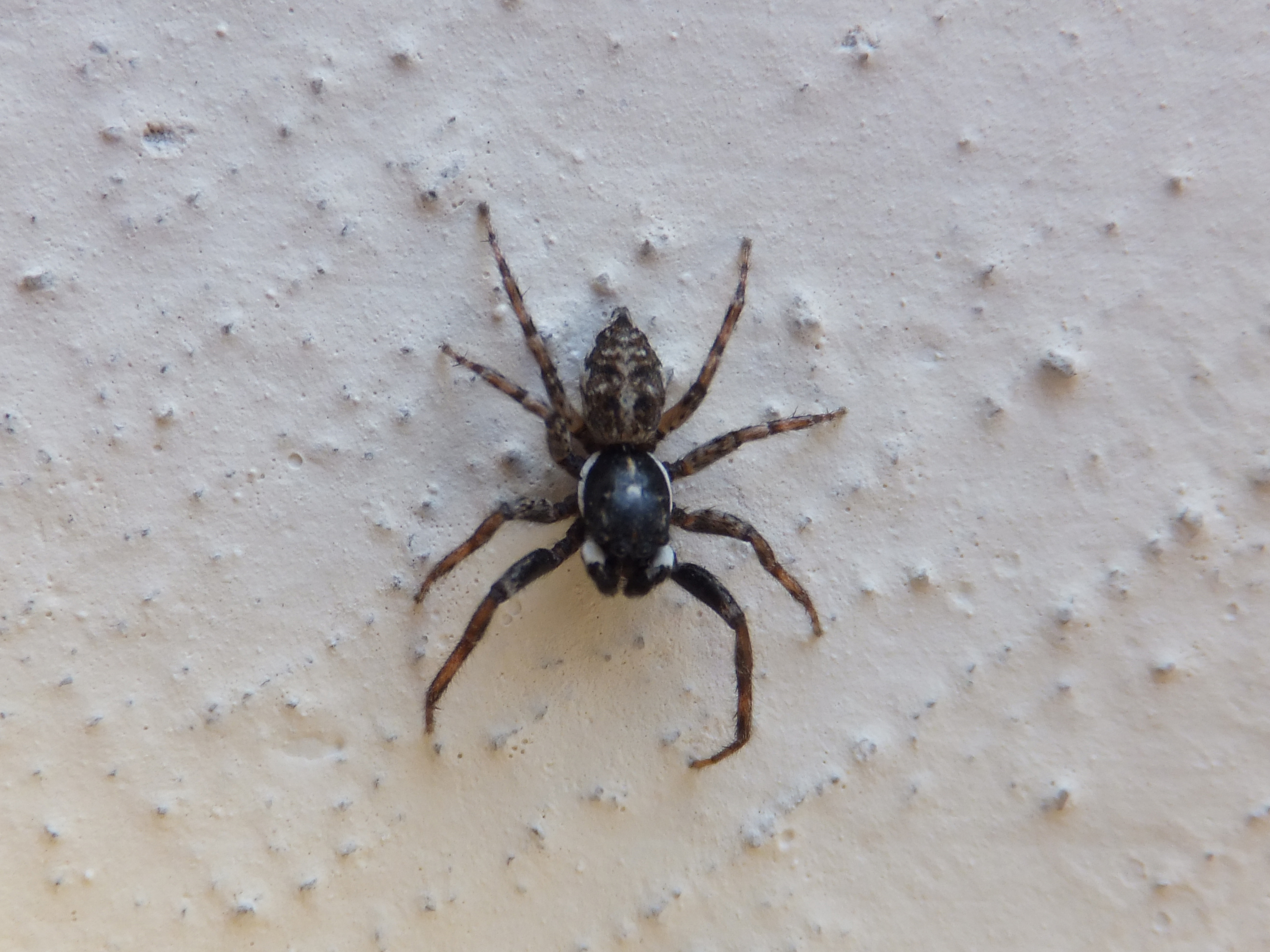
- The related Menemerus semilimbatus

Scientific classification
- Kingdom: Animalia
- Phylum: Arthropoda
- Subphylum: Chelicerata
- Class: Arachnida
- Order: Araneae
- Infraorder: Araneomorphae
- Family: Salticidae
- Genus: Menemerus
- Species: M. mirabilis

Binomial name
- Menemerus mirabilis Wesołowska, 1999

= Menemerus mirabilis =

Species of spider

Menemerus mirabilis is a species of jumping spider in the genus Menemerus that lives in Ethiopia in areas of human habitation, including a house and a hotel. The species was first described in 1999 by Wanda Wesołowska. The spider is small and brown, with a carapace that is between 1.8 and 2.4 millimetres (0.071 and 0.094 in) long and an abdomen between 2.0 and 3.5 millimetres (0.079 and 0.138 in) long. The female has a larger and lighter abdomen than the male. The male has an indistinct leaf-shaped pattern on its abdomen. It is similar to other species in the genus but can be distinguished by its copulatory organs. The male has a shorter embolus than other species. The female can be identified by the two depressions in its epigyne and its circular spermathecae.

== Taxonomy ==
Menemerus mirabilis is a species of jumping spider that was first described by Wanda Wesołowska in 1999. It was one of over 500 species identified by the Polish arachnologist during her career, making her one of the most prolific in the field. She allocated the spider to the genus Menemerus. The genus was first described in 1868 by Eugène Simon and contains over 60 species. The genus name derives from two Greek words, meaning certainly and diurnal. The genus shares some characteristics with the genera Hypaeus and Pellenes.

Genetic analysis has shown that the genus Menemerus is related to the genera Helvetia and Phintella. It was placed in the tribe Heliophaninae, which was reconstituted as Chrysillini by Wayne Maddison in 2015. The tribe is ubiquitous across most continents of the world. It is allocated to the subclade Saltafresia in the clade Salticoida. In 2016, Prószyński created a group of genera named Menemerines after the genus. The vast majority of the species in Menemerines are members of the genus, with additional examples from Kima and Leptorchestes. The species name derives from the Latin for admirable, mirabilis.

== Description ==
Menemerus mirabilis is a small spider. The male has a carapace that is between 2.0 and 2.3 millimetres (0.079 and 0.091 in) long and between 1.4 and 1.6 millimetres (0.055 and 0.063 in) wide. Its abdomen is between 2.0 and 2.4 millimetres (0.079 and 0.094 in) long and between 1.2 and 1.5 millimetres (0.047 and 0.059 in) wide. The carapace is brown, covered in brown and light grey hairs, with stripes formed of white stripes that line the sides. The eye field is darker. The spider has a brown chelicerae, brownish labium, light brownmaxilae and brownish sternum. The spider's abdomen is brown on top with an indistinct yellowish leaf-shaped pattern slightly visible in the middle. The underside is yellowish-grey. It has grey spinnerets and yellow legs. The spider's copulatory organs are distinctive. The pedipalp is brown with white hairs on it. The embolus is very small with a lamella that is of a similar length. The palpal bulb has a distinctive arrangement of two tibial appendages, or apophyses, that are both short and stumpy, one smaller than the other.

The female has a carapace that is between 1.8 and 2.4 millimetres (0.071 and 0.094 in) long and between 1.4 and 1.8 millimetres (0.055 and 0.071 in) wide, and an abdomen between 2.5 and 3.5 millimetres (0.098 and 0.138 in) long and between 1.4 and 2.5 millimetres (0.055 and 0.098 in) wide. The carapace is similar to the male and the legs are lighter. The abdomen is larger and slightly darker with a faint stripe on the top and silver patches on its underside. The copulatory organs are distinctive. The epigyne is rounded with two depressions and a wide pocket. The insemination ducts are complex and lead to circular spermathecae.

Spiders of the Menemerus genus are difficult to distinguish. The species is similar to Menemerus legalli. The female slightly resembles Menemerus formosus, but differs in the existence of the two epigynal depressions, and the male 'Menemerus magnificus, which can be differentiate by its longer embolus and the shape of its tibial apophysis.

== Distribution and habitat ==
Menemerus spiders are found throughout Africa and Asia, and have been identified as far as Latin America. Menemerus mirabilis is endemic to Ethiopia. The species thrives in areas of human habitation. The male holotype was found in 1988 in a house in Addis Ababa at an altitude of 2,400 m (7,900 ft) above sea level. Other examples, both male and female, have been found nearby and in a hotel.
