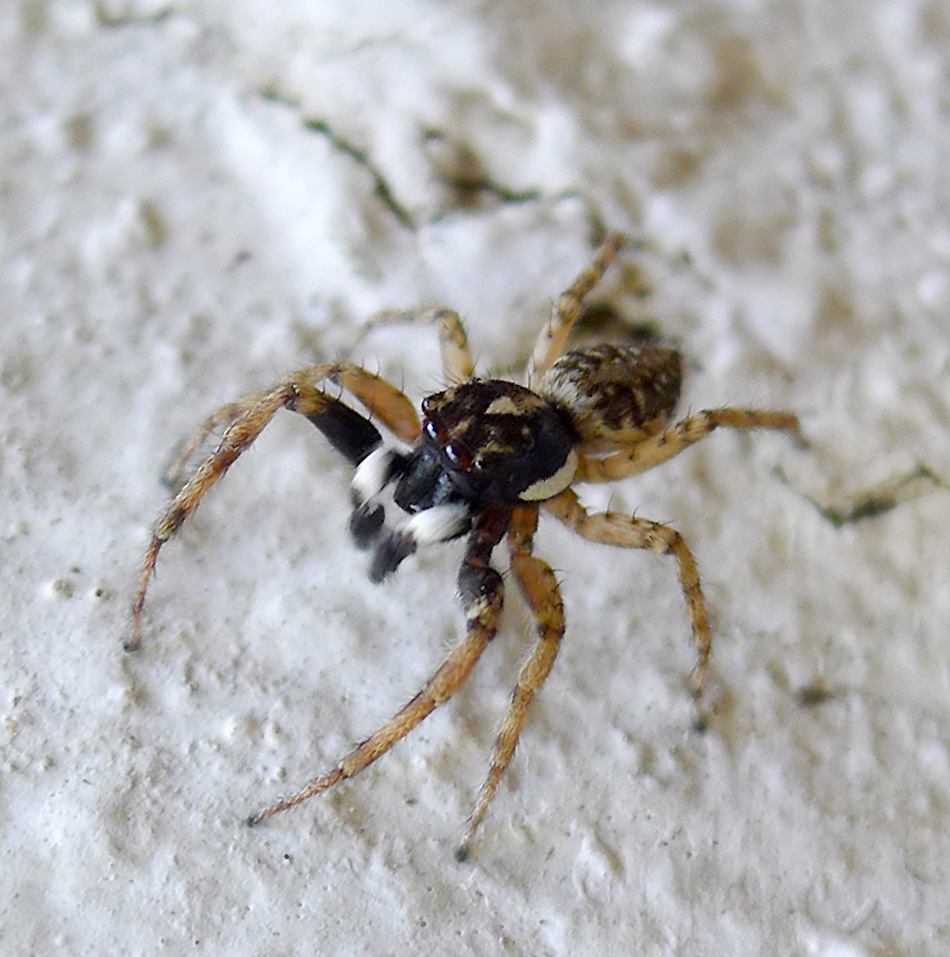
- The related Menemerus semilimbatus

Scientific classification
- Kingdom: Animalia
- Phylum: Arthropoda
- Subphylum: Chelicerata
- Class: Arachnida
- Order: Araneae
- Infraorder: Araneomorphae
- Family: Salticidae
- Genus: Menemerus
- Species: M. formosus

Binomial name
- Menemerus formosus Wesołowska, 1999

= Menemerus formosus =

Species of spider

Menemerus formosus is a species of jumping spider in the genus Menemerus that lives in Kenya. The species was first described in 1999 by Wanda Wesołowska, one of over 500 descriptions she has written during her lifetime. It is a small spider, with a brown carapace that is between 2.0 and 2.3 millimetres (0.079 and 0.091 in) long, with a darker eye field that is between 1.0 and 1.2 millimetres (0.039 and 0.047 in) long, and a yellowish abdomen between 1.9 and 2.3 millimetres (0.075 and 0.091 in) long. The female is larger than the male and has a pattern of silver patches on its abdomen. The legs are yellow. The species is similar to Menemerus bifurcus, Menemerus magnificus and Menemerus transvaalicus but differs in the design of its copulatory organs. The male has a conductor that curves over its short embolus. The female has an epigyne that has a shallow depression and a furrow with a wide pocket.

== Taxonomy ==
Menemerus formosus is a species of jumping spider that was first described by Wanda Wesołowska in 1999. It was one of over 500 species identified by the Polish arachnologist during her career, making her one of the most prolific experts in the field. She allocated the spider to the genus Menemerus. The genus was first described in 1868 by Eugène Simon and contains over 60 species. The genus name derives from two Greek words, meaning certainly and diurnal. The genus shares some characteristics with the genera Hypaeus and Pellenes.

Genetic analysis has shown that the genus is related to the genera Helvetia and Phintella. The species was placed in the tribe Heliophaninae, which was reconstituted as Chrysillini by Wayne Maddison in 2015. The tribe is ubiquitous across most of the continents of the world. it is allocated to the subclade Saltafresia in the clade Salticoida. In 2016, Prószyński created a group of genera named Menemerines after the genus. The vast majority of the species in Menemerines are members of the genus, with additional examples from Kima and Leptorchestes. The species name derives from the Latin word formosus that means neat or shapely.

== Description ==
Menemerus formosus is a small spider. The male has a brown carapace that is typically 2.0 millimetres (0.079 in) long, covered in dense brown and light greyish hairs. Lines formed of white hairs line the sides of the carapace. It has a darker eye field that is typically 1.0 millimetre (0.039 in) long with black areas around the eyes . The spider has a very low brown clypeus that has a scattering of white hairs. The chelicerae, labium and maxilae are brown; the sternum are orange. The yellowish abdomen is typical 1.9 millimetres (0.075 in) long. The underside is whitish. It has light spinnerets and yellow legs. The pedipalp is orange. The embolus is short with a conductor that is of a slightly longer and curves over the top of it. The cymbium has a large bulge at its base. The palpal bulb has a distinctive arrangement of three tibial appendages, or apophyses. One is short and stumpy, pointing upwards, and the two point downwards.

The female is larger than the male. It has a carapace and abdomen that are each between 2.0 and 2.3 millimetres (0.079 and 0.091 in) long. The carapace is similar to the male with an eye field that is between 1.1 and 1.2 millimetres (0.043 and 0.047 in) long. The abdomen is yellowish with a pattern of silver patches. The spider has a large epigyne that is highly sclerotized and has a shallow depression and a furrow with a wide pocket. It has distinctive insemination ducts that have an unusual morphology, which are short and paired to accessory glands and to small spermathecae.

Spiders of the Menemerus genus are difficult to distinguish. The species is particularly similar to the related Menemerus bifurcus and Menemerus transvaalicus. The copulatory organs enable the species to be differentiated. For example, the male has a distinctive shape of its embolus. The female is similar to Menemerus magnificus but differs in its one rather than two depressions in its epigyne.

== Behaviour ==
Like many jumping spiders, Menemerus spiders do not spin webs to capture prey. Instead, they are mainly diurnal hunters that use their good eyesight to spot their prey. The spiders use visual displays during courtship and transmit vibratory signals through silk to communicate to other spiders. The males also undertake aggressive displays between themselves. They are hesitant attacking other spiders. Menemerus spiders in the country live in groups in loose association with each other.

== Distribution and habitat ==
Menemerus spiders are found throughout Africa and Asia, and have been identified as far as Latin America. Menemerus formosus is found in Kenya. The male holotype was found near Lake Turkana in 1920. Other examples were also found nearby. It has not been found in other areas of the country.
