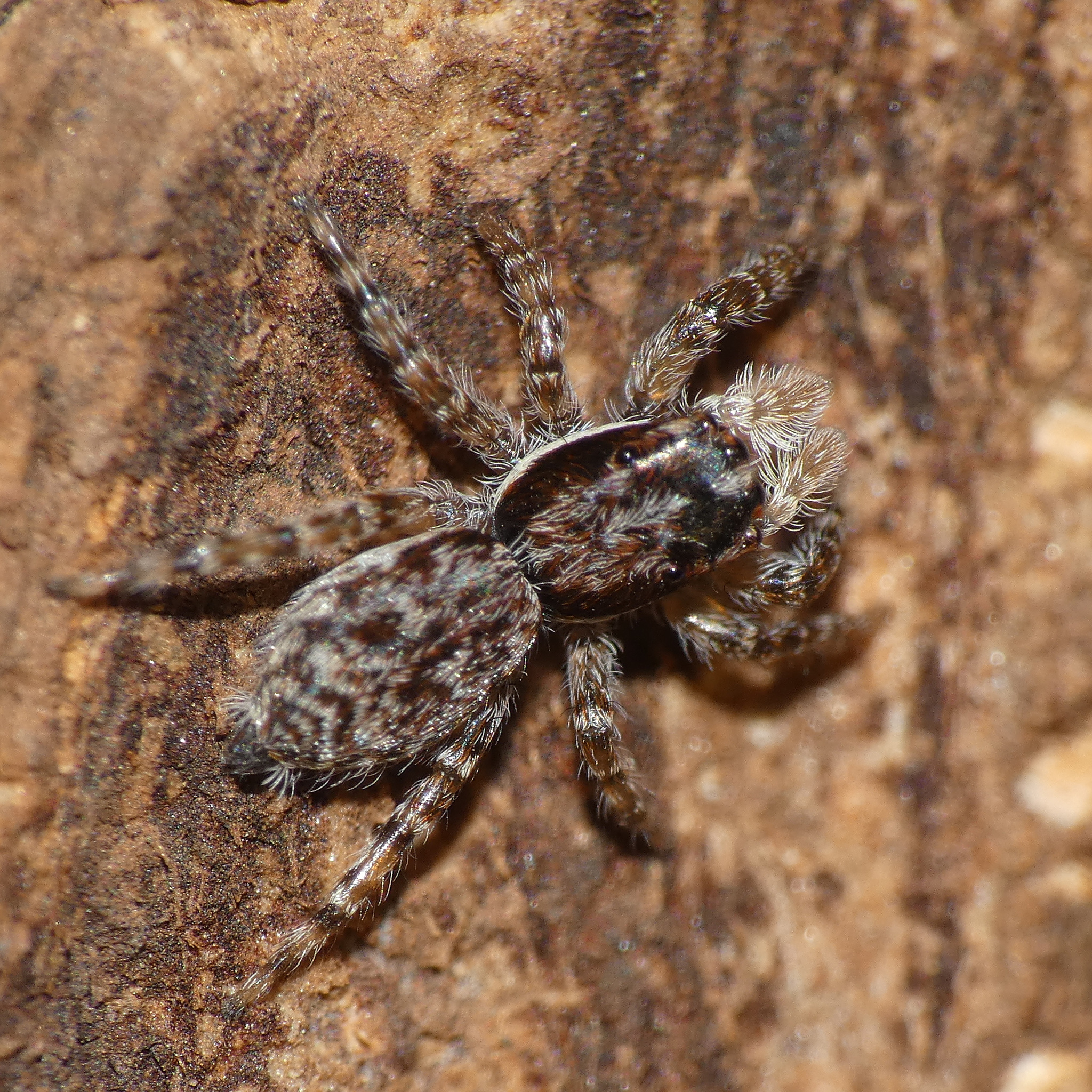

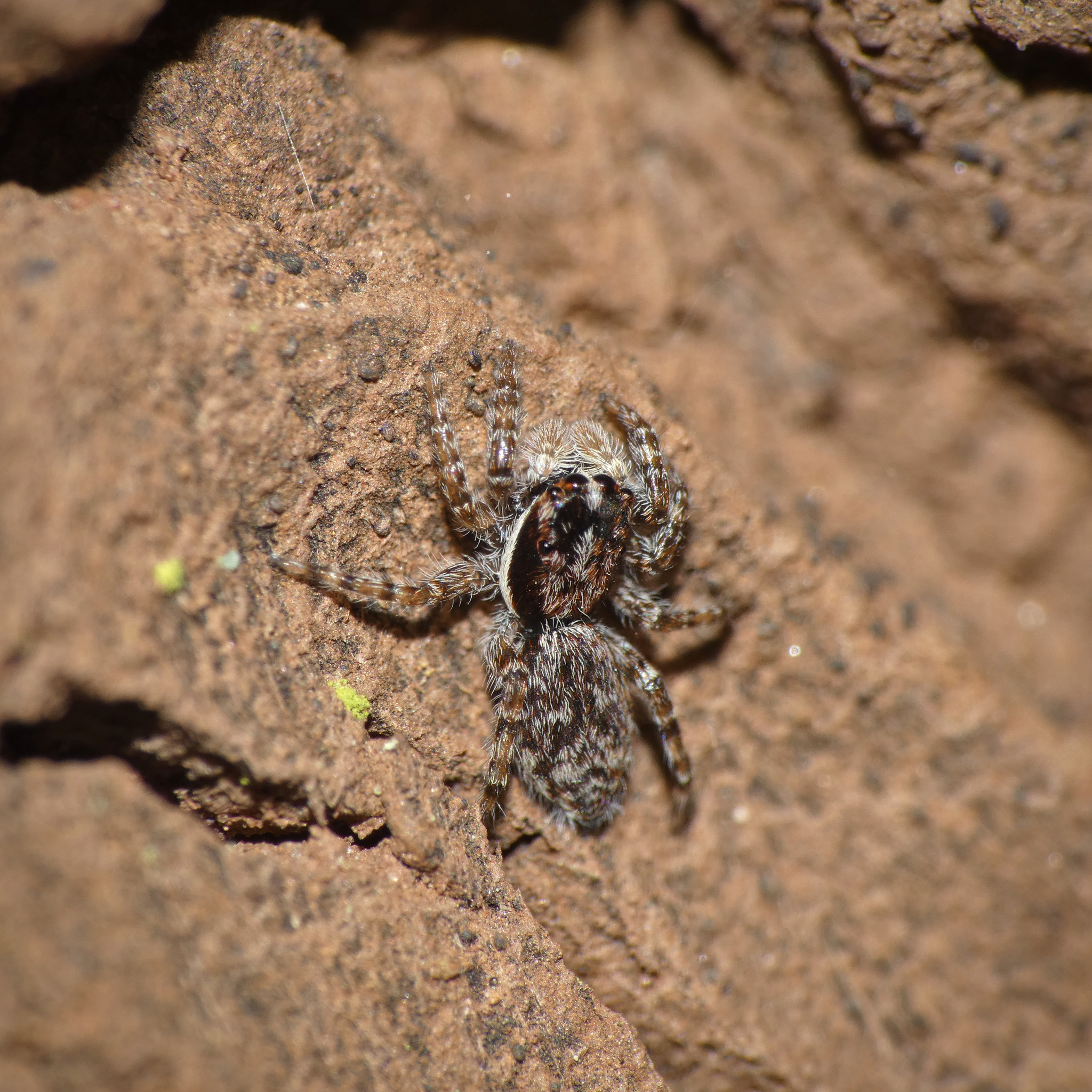
- A mature spider of the species from South Africa

Scientific classification
- Kingdom: Animalia
- Phylum: Arthropoda
- Subphylum: Chelicerata
- Class: Arachnida
- Order: Araneae
- Infraorder: Araneomorphae
- Family: Salticidae
- Genus: Menemerus
- Species: M. bifurcus

Binomial name
- Menemerus bifurcus Wesołowska, 1999

= Menemerus bifurcus =

Species of jumping spider

Menemerus bifurcus is a species of jumping spider that lives in South Africa, Zambia and Zimbabwe. A member of the genus Menemerus, the spider lives in groups in Acacia, Combretum, Jacaranda, Spathodea and Trichilia trees as well as in houses and other areas of human habitation. It descends to attack prey on long threads of silk. It is a small spider, with a forward section, or carapace, that is between 1.9 and 2.3 millimetres (0.075 and 0.091 in) long and a rear section, or abdomen, between 1.9 and 2.5 millimetres (0.075 and 0.098 in) long. The female is larger than the male and generally lighter, ranging generally from fawnish-brown to dark brown.

The species is similar to Menemerus formosus and Menemerus transvaalicus but differs in the design of its copulatory organs. The male has a short embolus with a longer lamella, which is recalled in the species name, and two distinctive tibial appendages, or apophyses, one with a characteristic triangular lobe. Examples found in Zimbabwe have one longer tibial apophysis. The female has a heart-shaped depression in its epigyne, the external visible part of its copulatory organs, and an unusual insemination duct morphology internally. The species was first described in 1999 by the Polish arachnologist Wanda Wesołowska, one of over 500 descriptions she has written during her lifetime.

== Taxonomy and etymology ==
Menemerus bifurcus is a species of jumping spider, a member of the family Salticidae, that was first described by the Polish arachnologist Wanda Wesołowska in 1999. It was one of over 500 species identified by the scientist during her career, making her one of the most prolific in the field. She allocated the spider to the genus Menemerus. The genus was first described in 1868 by French naturalist Eugène Simon and contains over 60 species. The spider's generic name derives from two Greek words, meaning "certainly" and "diurnal". The genus shares some characteristics with the genera Hypaeus and Pellenes.

Genetic analysis has shown that Menemerus is related to the genera Helvetia and Phintella. The genus was placed in the tribe Heliophaninae until that was reconstituted as Chrysillini by Canadian scientist Wayne Maddison in 2015. The tribe is ubiquitous across most of the continents of the world. It is allocated to the subclade Saltafresia in the clade Salticoida. In 2016, Polish arachnologist Jerzy Prószyński created a group of genera named Menemerines after the genus. The vast majority of the species in Menemerines are members of the genus Menemerus, with additional examples from Kima and Leptorchestes. The spider's specific name derives from two Latin words, bis and furca, which describe the shape of the male's embolus. The holotype is stored in the Natural History Museum of Zimbabwe in Bulawayo.

== Description ==
Menemerus bifurcus is a small spider. The male has a flat dark brown carapace, the hard upper side of the front section of its body, that is between 1.9 and 2.1 mm (0.075 and 0.083 in) long and between 1.3 and 1.6 mm (0.051 and 0.063 in) wide, covered in short brown and whitish hairs. Lines formed of white hairs line the sides of the carapace. It has a darker eye field. The part of the spider's face known as its clypeus is very low, brown, and has white hairs. Its mouthparts, including its chelicerae and labium, are light brown apart from its maxillae, which are brownish. The part of the underside of its front section known as its sternum is also brownish.

Behind its carapace is an abdomen that is between 1.9 and 2.0 mm (0.075 and 0.079 in) long and typically 1.6 mm (0.063 in) wide. Most examples have a fawnish-brown abdomen, while some are dark brown. Some have a light pattern of three or four spots, although this is usually quite faint. The underside of each abdomen is lighter. The spider has brownish spinnerets and brown or orange legs. Its pedipalps are brown with white hairs visible on the palpal femur. The male has distinctive copulatory organs. At the end of its pedipalp is its tibia, which has a distinctive arrangement of two appendages, or tibial apophyses. One is short and stumpy, pointing upwards, and the other is longer and points downwards. On top of the tibia is a cymbium that has a large lump at its base. Attached to this is a palpal bulb that has a large lump at its base and another on its side. At the end of the palpal bulb is an embolus that is short with a lamella that is of a slightly longer length.

The female is larger than the male. It has a carapace that is between 2.1 and 2.3 mm (0.083 and 0.091 in) long and between 1.6 and 1.8 mm (0.063 and 0.071 in) wide and an abdomen between 2.1 and 2.5 mm (0.083 and 0.098 in) in length and between 1.7 and 1.8 mm (0.067 and 0.071 in) in width. It is generally also lighter than the male. Its carapace is fawnish-brown and covered with brown hairs. Its eye field is dark brown with white hairs. Dark rings encircle Its eyes. Its chelicerae, labium and maxillae are orange. Its sternum is yellow. In some examples, its abdomen is yellowish all over with a covering of brown hairs; in others, it is similar to the male except lighter. Its spinnerets are always yellowish. Its epigyne, the external visible part of its copulatory organs, has a wide notch on the rearmost edge and a heart-shaped depression. The two copulatory openings lead to wide highly sclerotized insemination ducts that have an unusual morphology. The ducts are relatively long and curved with distinctive narrow accessory glands and long thin spermathecae, or receptacles. There is also evidence of sclerotization near its gonopores.

Spiders of the Menemerus genus are difficult to distinguish. The species is particularly similar to the related Menemerus formosus and Menemerus transvaalicus. Externally, they are hard to distinguish but its copulatory organs are very different. For example, the male has a distinctive triangular retrolateral lobe below an unusual dorsal apophysis which the others lack. The female has more sclerotization throughout its copulatory openings. The shape of its epigyne depression is also distinctive. There are also differences between examples found in different areas. The male spiders found in Zimbabwe have a longer tibial apophysis than those from Zambia.

== Behaviour ==
Menemerus bifurcus does not spin webs. Instead, it lives in the tops of trees and descends to attack prey on long threads of silk. The spider makes a dense cocoon when moulting. The spiders have been noted to mate between September and January. Juveniles appear in both March and April. Like other jumping spiders, Menemerus spiders undertake complex displays and dances during courtship. The males also undertake aggressive displays between themselves. They are hesitant attacking other spiders. The species nests under strips of bark and between flat overlapping flakes of bark. It will stay hidden under bark when hunting. Generally, the spiders are difficult to observe in the wild, being secretive and shy, and use camouflage well. Unlike other species, it lives in groups with other Menemerus bifurcus spiders in loose association with each other.

== Distribution and habitat ==
Menemerus spiders are found throughout Africa and Asia, and have been identified as far as Brazil, although these examples are likely to have been introduced accidentally due to international trade. Menemerus bifurcus is found across Southern Africa. The male holotype was found near Kitwe, Zambia, in 1963. Zimbabwean examples have been seen in Bulawayo in 1962 and Harare in 1998. Examples found in South Africa are found in Rust De Winter Nature Reserve in 1972, Pretoria in 1976 and Tshipise in 1979. The spider lives in trees, particularly the bark of Acacia, Jacaranda and Spathodea trees. Examples that live in the Sengwa Wildlife Research Area in Zimbabwe have been found on the bark of trees of the Combretum genus and trunks of Trichilia trees. The spider also lives in houses and areas of habitation, including the museum in Bulawayo.
