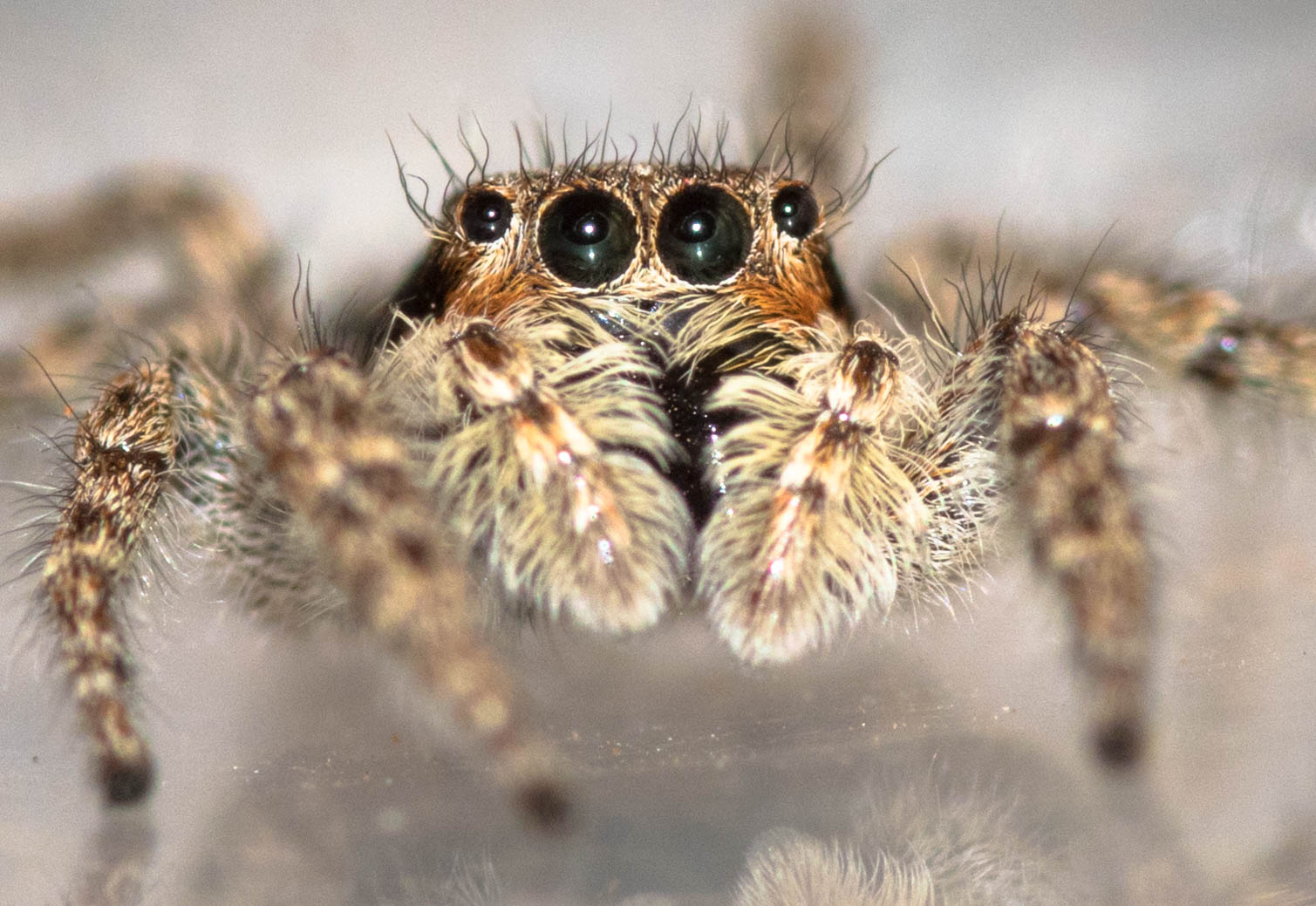
- A spider of the Menemerus genus

Scientific classification
- Kingdom: Animalia
- Phylum: Arthropoda
- Subphylum: Chelicerata
- Class: Arachnida
- Order: Araneae
- Infraorder: Araneomorphae
- Family: Salticidae
- Genus: Menemerus
- Species: M. magnificus

Binomial name
- Menemerus magnificus Wesołowska, 1999

= Menemerus magnificus =

Species of spider

Menemerus magnificus is a species of jumping spider in the genus Menemerus that lives in Cameroon. The species was first described in 1999 by Wanda Wesołowska, one of over 500 descriptions she wrote during her lifetime. The spider is small, with a carapace that is typically 1.2 millimetres (0.05 in) long and an abdomen that is 1.8 millimetres (0.07 in) long. The carapace is generally a uniform dark brown while the abdomen has two rows of patches on the back. Otherwise, it is its copulatory organs that most distinguish the species from others in the genus. The male has a distinctive dorsal tibia that includes horn-like appendages, or apophyses, and lobes. The female has not been described.

== Taxonomy ==
Menemerus magnificus is a species of jumping spider that was first described by Wanda Wesołowska in 1999. It was one of over 500 species identified by the Polish arachnologist during her career, ensuring her reputation as one of the most prolific in the field. She allocated the spider to the genus Menemerus. The genus was first circumscribed in 1868 by Eugène Simon and contains over 60 species. The genus name derives from two Greek words, meaning certainly and diurnal. The species name is derived from the Latin word for magnificent.

Genetic analysis has shown that Menemerus is related to the genera Helvetia and Phintella. The genus shares some characteristics with the genera Hypaeus and Pellenes. It was placed in the tribe Heliophaninae, which was reconstituted as Chrysillini by Wayne Maddison in 2015. The tribe is ubiquitous across most continents of the world. It is allocated to the subclade Saltafresia in the clade Salticoida. In 2016, Jerzy Prószyński created a group of genera named Menemerines after the genus. The vast majority of the species in Menemerines are members of the genus, with additional examples from Kima and Leptorchestes.

== Description ==
Menemerus magnificus is a rather small spider. The male has a brown carapace that is typically 1.2 millimetres (0.05 in) long and 1.3 millimetres (0.05 in) wide and has a black eye field. The spider's abdomen is larger, typically 1.8 mm (0.07 in) long and 1.3 millimetres (0.05 in) wide. It is greyish-brown with two rows of translucent patches on the top and light underneath, and is covered with a large number of dark brown hairs. The spider has dark brown chelicerae but the remainder of the spider's mouthparts, including its labium and maxilae are brown, as is the underside of the carapace or sternum. The spinnerets are beige and the legs are yellow with brown hairs and spines. The legs are covered in brown and white hairs, and have brown spines. The spider's copulatory organs are distinctive. The pedipalp is brown and has a short and wide embolus with an opposing conductor of a similar size and a tibia that includes two large horn-like appendages, or apophyses, and various lobes. The female has not been described.

Spiders of the Menemerus genus are difficult to distinguish from each other. It is the copulatory organs that enable the different species to be identified, particularly the distinctive shape of the tibial apophyses. The species is particularly similar to Menemerus mirabilis but has a longer embolus.

== Distribution ==
Menemerus magnificus is endemic to Cameroon. The holotype was found in 1956 in the Cameroon mountains at an altitude of 1,000 m (3,300 ft) above sea level. It is only known from that area of the country.
