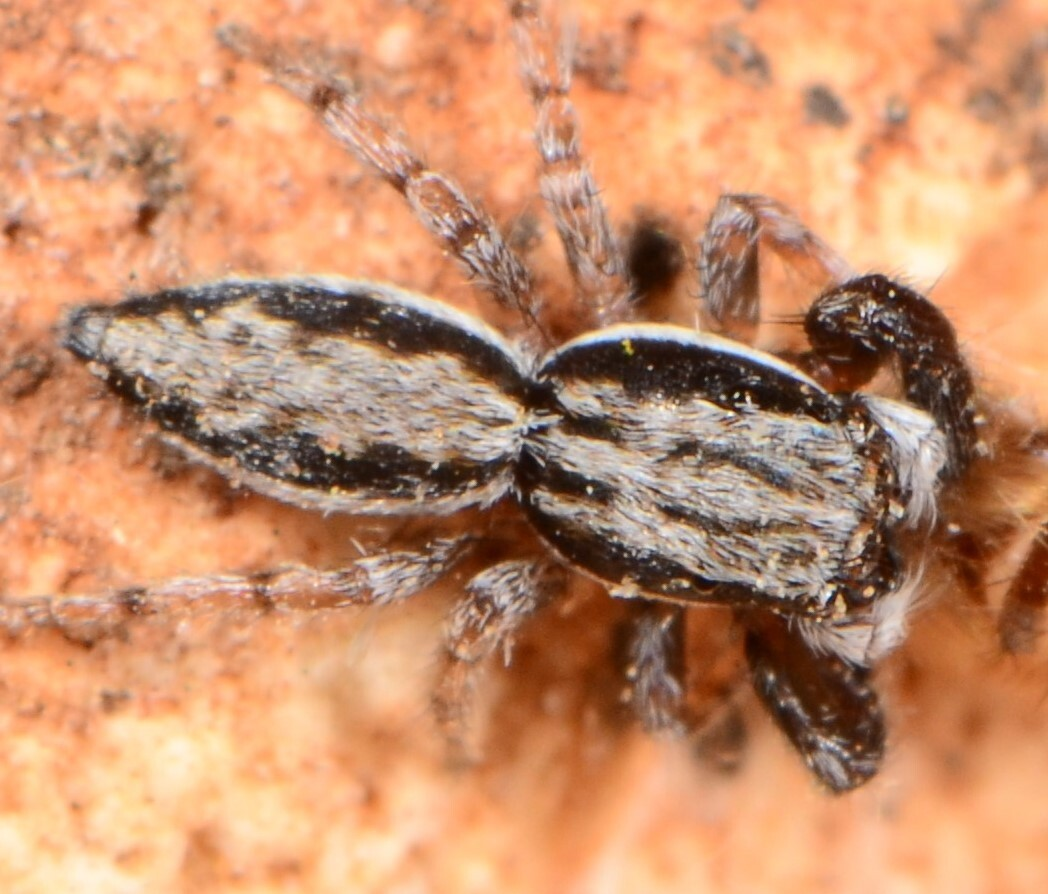
- female
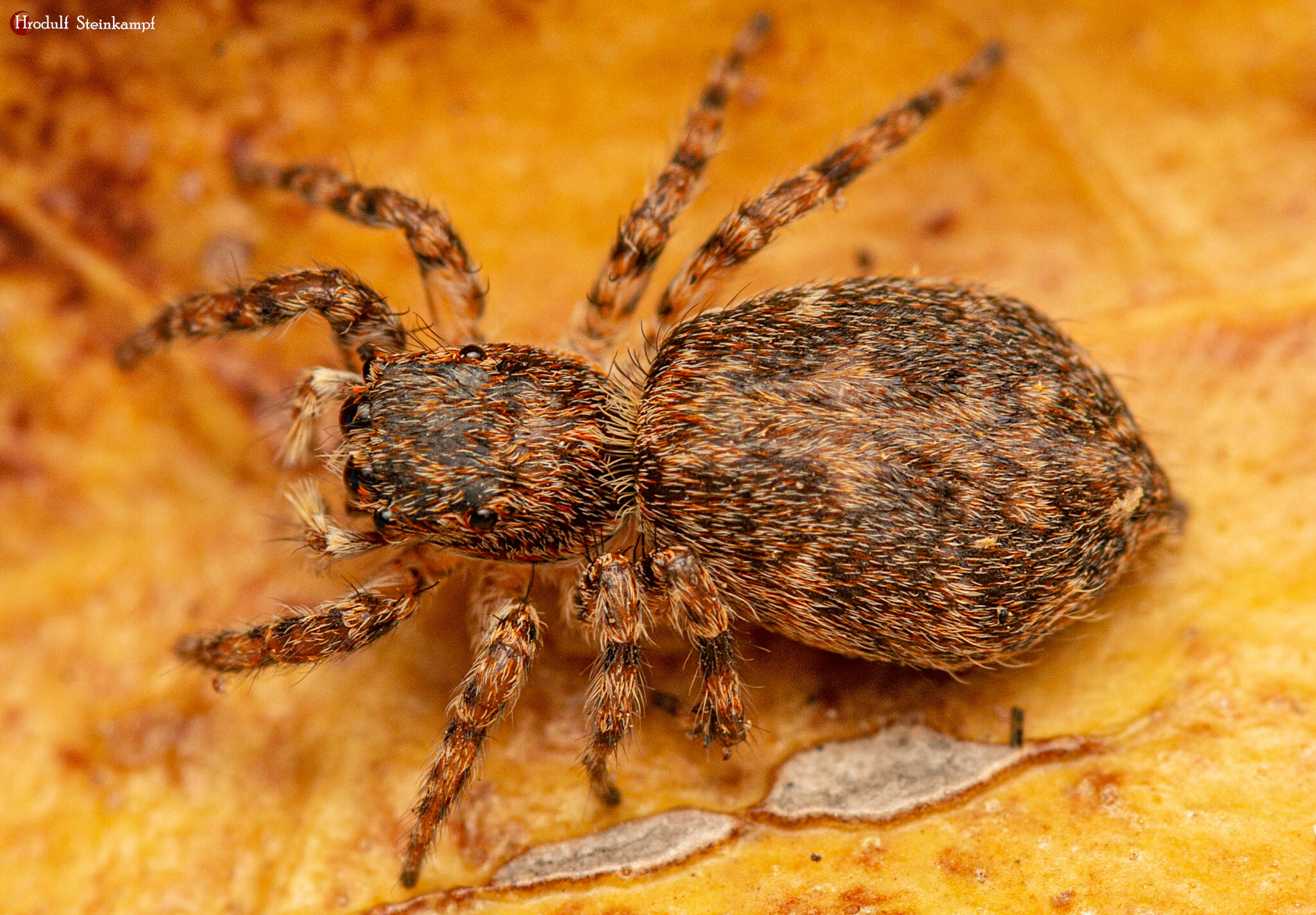
- female

Scientific classification
- Kingdom: Animalia
- Phylum: Arthropoda
- Subphylum: Chelicerata
- Class: Arachnida
- Order: Araneae
- Infraorder: Araneomorphae
- Family: Salticidae
- Genus: Menemerus
- Species: M. transvaalicus

Binomial name
- Menemerus transvaalicus Wesołowska, 1999

= Menemerus transvaalicus =

Species of spider

Menemerus transvaalicus is a species of jumping spider in the genus Menemerus that lives in Lesotho and South Africa. The species was first identified in 1999 by Wanda Wesołowska, one of over 500 descriptions she has written during her lifetime. The spider often lives on Eucalyptus trees and the walls of buildings. It is small, with a dark brown hairy carapace that is between 2.1 and 2.5 millimetres (0.083 and 0.098 in) long and a fawn to dark brown abdomen that is between 2.0 and 3.6 millimetres (0.079 and 0.142 in) in length. The female is larger than the male. It has a yellowish leaf-shaped pattern on its abdomen and orange to brown legs. The male has a conductor on its double embolus, which helps to distinguish the spider from the related Menemerus bifurcus.

== Taxonomy ==
Menemerus transvaalicus is a species of jumping spider that was first described by Wanda Wesołowska in 1999. It was one of over 500 species identified by the Polish arachnologist during her career, making her one of the most prolific in the field. She allocated the spider to the genus Menemerus. The genus was first described in 1868 by Eugène Simon and contains over 60 species. The genus name derives from two Greek words, meaning certainly and diurnal. The genus shares some characteristics with the genera Hypaeus and Pellenes.

Genetic analysis has shown that the genus Menemerus is related to the genera Helvetia and Phintella. The species was placed in the tribe Heliophaninae, which was renamed as Chrysillini by Wayne Maddison in 2015. The tribe is ubiquitous across most continents of the world. it is allocated to the subclade Saltafresia in the clade Salticoida. In 2016, Prószyński created a group of genera named Menemerines after the genus. The vast majority of the species in Menemerines are members of the genus, with additional examples from Kima and Leptorchestes. The species name derives from the name of the province where it was first found, Transvaal.

== Description ==
Menemerus transvaalicus is a small spider. The male has a carapace that is between 2.1 and 2.4 millimetres (0.083 and 0.094 in) long and 1.5 and 1.8 millimetres (0.059 and 0.071 in) wide. It is dark brown and covered in brown hairs apart from two white hairy bands along the edges. The eye field is black and bristles can be found near the eyes. The spider has a very low white clypeus, dark brown chelicerae and brownish-orange sternum. The labium and maxilae are light brown. It has an abdomen that is between 2.0 and 2.6 millimetres (0.079 and 0.102 in) long and 1.6 and 2.0 millimetres (0.063 and 0.079 in) wide. It is generally fawn to dark brown and has many yellowish-grey and brown hairs, There is a yellowish leaf-shaped pattern, sometimes very indistinct, on the top while the underside sometimes has a dark wide stripe on an otherwise lighter shade. It has light brown spinnerets and orange to brown legs. The pedipalps, which are brown with white hairs, have two tibial apophyses, a large lump at the base of the cymbium and a double embolus with a narrow conductor.

The female is larger than the male with a carapace that is between 2.2 and 2.5 millimetres (0.087 and 0.098 in) in length and 1.6 and 1.9 millimetres (0.063 and 0.075 in) in width and an abdomen that is between 2.5 and 3.6 millimetres (0.098 and 0.142 in) long and 1.7 and 2.0 millimetres (0.067 and 0.079 in) wide. It is otherwise very similar to the male. The carapace is similar, but with white and brown hairs. The maxillae are brown with pale tips. The abdomen has a more distinctive pattern. The epigyne has two central oval depressions and a very wide pocket. The insemination ducts are narrow and looping, with large spermathecae.

Spiders of the Menemerus genus are difficult to distinguish. Indeed, some examples of this species were originally incorrectly identified as Menemerus soldani. The abdominal pattern helps to identify the species, but a study of the copulatory organs is needed to confirm each spider's identity. This species is particularly similar to the related Menemerus bifurcus, but differs in the shape of the male embolus, and particularly the existence of the conductor, and the lack of a triangular retrolateral bulb below the dorsal spike. The female is harder to identify but has substantially less sclerotization on the copulatory openings.

== Behaviour ==
Due to their good eyesight, Menemerus spiders are mostly diurnal hunters. They attack using a complex approach to their prey and are generally more proactive in comparison to web-spinning spiders. The related Menemerus bifurcus lives in the tops of trees and descends to attack prey on long threads of silk. The spiders will eat a wide range of prey, including nectar. They undertake complex displays and dances during courtship. The males also undertake aggressive displays between themselves.

== Distribution and habitat ==
Menemerus spiders are found throughout Africa and Asia, and have been identified as far as Latin America. Menemerus transvaalicus lives in Lesotho and South Africa. The male holotype was found in the Marievale Bird Sanctuary in 1990. Examples have been found throughout the Eastern Cape, Free State and Gauteng provinces. The first examples to be found in Lesotho were discovered in Moshoeshoe I International Airport near Maseru in 1977, and later near the Mohale Dam and in Qacha's Nek District in 2003. The species often lives in the barks of trees, particularly Eucalyptus, and on the walls of buildings.
