= Versailles discography =

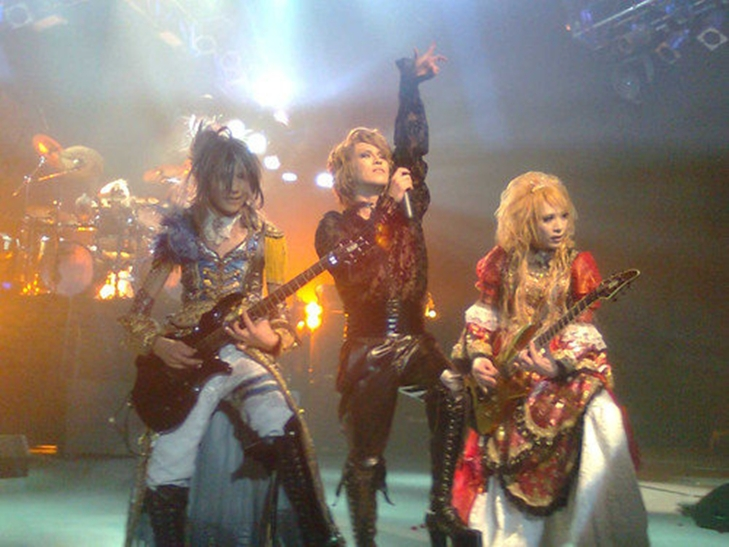
- Studio albums: 4
- Extended plays: 2
- Live albums: 2
- Compilation albums: 1
- Singles: 9
- Video albums: 6
- Music videos: 11
- Promotional songs: 1
- Various artists compilations: 4

The discography of Versailles, a Japanese visual kei metal band formed in 2007 by vocalist Kamijo and guitarist Hizaki. After recruiting bassist Jasmine You, drummer Yuki and guitarist Teru, they performed their first show on June 23. Their key characteristics are their Rococo-esque costumes, dueling guitars and heavy but melodic arrangements. Versailles gained a significant worldwide following soon after forming as their debut EP Lyrical Sympathy (2007), released by Kamijo's own label Sherow Artist Society, received a simultaneous European release and they performed in Europe and the United States the following year. Their first full-length album, Noble released in 2008, was also released in North America in 2009.

Versailles signed to major label Warner Music Japan in mid-2009, however, on August 9, days after announcing he would be suspending activities for health reasons, Jasmine You died. Their major debut album Jubilee (2010) was completed with Hizaki performing the unfinished bass tracks. They went on a world tour that took them to Latin America and Europe and ended with new bassist Masashi officially joining. 2011 began with the whole band starring in their own television show titled Onegai Kanaete Versailles (おねがいかなえてヴェルサイユ; lit. "Fulfill My Wish Versailles"), that ran from January to March. Their third album Holy Grail (2011) was their highest charting, reaching number 12 on the Oricon, and was supported by their second world tour. On July 20, 2012, Versailles announced they would be stopping all activities at the end of the year. They released their last album, the self-titled Versailles, on September 26 and after a short tour, performed their last concert at NHK Hall on December 20. The band has reunited for a concert on December 28, 2015 at Zepp DiverCity in Tokyo and has planned another one in 2016 also. In February 2017, the band played a concert at the historical venue Nippon Budokan.

== Albums ==
=== Studio albums ===
Year	Album	Peak chart position	
Year	Album	Oricon Style Albums Weekly Chart	
Year	Album	Indie	Normal
2008	Noble: Released: July 16, 2008; Label: Sherow Artist Society; Formats: CD and digital download	4	42
2010	Jubilee: Released: January 20, 2010; Label: Warner Music Japan; Formats: CD	—	16
2011	Holy Grail: Released: June 15, 2011; Label: Warner Music Japan; Formats: CD	—	12
2012	Versailles: Released: September 26, 2012; Label: Warner Music Japan; Formats: CD	—	31

=== Extended plays ===
Year	EP	Peak chart position	
Year	EP	Oricon Style Albums Weekly Chart	
Year	EP	Indie	Normal
2007	Lyrical Sympathy: Released: October 31, 2007; Label: Sherow Artist Society; Format: CD	4	76
2017	Lineage: Released: March 10, 2017; Label: Warner Music Japan; Format: CD, music download		

=== Live albums ===
Year	Album	Peak chart position	
Year	Album	Oricon Style Albums Weekly Chart	
Year	Album	Indie	Normal
2010	Lyrical Sympathy -Live-: Released: September 1, 2010; Label: Sherow Artist Society; Format: CD	14	123
2010	Noble -Live-: Released: September 1, 2010; Label: Sherow Artist Society; Format: CD	17	130

=== Compilation albums ===
Year	Album	Peak chart position	
Year	Album	Oricon Style Albums Weekly Chart	
Year	Album	Indie	Normal
2013	Anthologie: Release: January 30, 2013; Label: Warner Music Japan		52
2016	The Greatest Hits: Release: September 14, 2016; Label: Warner Music Japan		

== Singles ==
Year	Single	Peak chart position		Album
Year	Single	Oricon Style Singles Weekly Chart		Album
Year	Single	Indie	Normal	Album
2007	"The Revenant Choir"	—		Noble
2008	"A Noble Was Born In Chaos"	—		Noble
2008	"Prince & Princess"	1	16	Jubilee
2009	"Ascendead Master"	—	8	Jubilee
2010	"Destiny -The Lovers-"	—	17	Holy Grail
2011	"Philia"	—	15	Holy Grail
2012	"Rhapsody of the Darkness"	—	—	Versailles
2012	"Rose"	—	23	Versailles
2023	"VOGUE"			
Promotional songs
2008	"Prince"	—		Noble

== Various artists compilations ==
Year	Song	Album
2007	"The Love From a Dead Orchestra"	Tokyo Rock City
2007	"The Red Carpet Day"	Cupia Vol. 1
2008	"Sforzando"	Cross Gate 2008 -Chaotic Sorrow-
2008	"Prince"	The Art of Propaganda

== Music videos ==
Year	Song
2007	"The Revenant Choir"
2007	"Shout & Bites"
2008	"Aristocrat's Symphony"
2009	"Ascendead Master"
2010	"Serenade"
2010	"Destiny -The Lovers-"
2011	"Philia" (2 versions)
2011	"Masquerade" (6 versions)
2011	"Vampire"
2012	"Truth"
2023	"VOGUE"

== DVDs ==
- The Revenant Choir (June 23, 2007)
- Aesthetic Violence (December 12, 2007) – given with bottle of each member's perfume, Oricon DVDs Ranking: #219 (Yuki's version)
- Urakizoku (裏貴族, December 24, 2007) – Node of Scherzo; features Versailles, Kaya and Juka
- Kakumei no Anthology (革命のアンソロジー, May 18, 2009) – promotional clip DVD given out at the band's Kakumei no Anthology events
- History of the Other Side (May 20, 2009) #48
- Chateau de Versailles (May 20, 2009) #42
- Onegai Kanaete Versailles (おねがいかなえてヴェルサイユ "Fulfill My Wish Versailles", July 6, 2011) – all 10 episodes of their TV drama, #84
- Chateau de Versailles -Jubilee- (December 21, 2011) #103 (world edition)
- Chateau de Versailles -Holy Grail- (October 31, 2012) #36
- Live Best (March 27, 2013) #232
- Chateau de Versailles -Final- (April 10, 2013) #65
