= Versailles (album) =

Studio album by Versailles
- Released: September 26, 2012
- Genre: Power metal, symphonic metal
- Label: Warner Music Japan

Versailles chronology
Holy Grail (2011)	Versailles (2012)	Anthologie (2013)

Versailles is the fourth studio album by Versailles. It was released on September 26, 2012.

== Track listing ==
Disc 1 (CD)
No.	Title	Lyrics	Music	Length
1.	"Prelude"	Kamijo	Kamijo	1:35
2.	"Rose"	Kamijo	Hizaki	5:25
3.	"Rhapsody of the Darkness"	Kamijo	Hizaki	4:54
4.	"Edge of the World"	Kamijo	Teru	5:17
5.	"Illusion"	Kamijo	Kamijo	5:07
6.	"Ayakashi" (妖 -ayakashi-)	Kamijo	Masashi	4:37
7.	"Created Beauty"	Hizaki	Hizaki	10:05
8.	"Holy Grail -Amoroso-"	(instrumental)	Hizaki	5:03
9.	"Brave"	Kamijo	Teru	4:33
10.	"Truth"	Kamijo	Kamijo	4:45
11.	"Sympathia"	Kamijo	Hizaki	6:14

Disc 2 (DVD, Limited Edition)
No.	Title	Lyrics	Music	Length
1.	"Ascendead Master Story I–III" (Movie)
2.	"Ascendead Master" (Music video)	Kamijo	Hizaki
3.	"Serenade" (Music video)	Kamijo	Hizaki
4.	"Destiny" (Music Video)	Kamijo	Kamijo
5.	"Philia" (Music video)	Kamijo	Hizaki
6.	"Masquerade" (Music video)	Kamijo	Kamijo
7.	"Vampire" (Music Video)	Kamijo	Kamijo
