= Noble Live =

Noble -Live-

Live album by Versailles
- Released: September 1, 2010
- Genre: Symphonic metal, power metal, neo-classical metal
- Label: Sherow Artist Society

Discography chronology
| Lyrical Sympathy -Live- (2010) | Noble -Live- (2010) |

Noble -Live- is a live album by Versailles, released on September 1, 2010. It is a live version of their debut album Noble (not including "To the Chaos Inside" and "Episode"), but also includes "Prince".

== Track listing ==
| No. | Title | Lyrics | Music | Length |
|---|---|---|---|---|
| 1. | "Prelude" | Kamijo | Kamijo | 4:24 |
| 2. | "Aristocrat's Symphony" | Kamijo | Kamijo | 6:31 |
| 3. | "Antique in the Future" | Kamijo | Kamijo | 6:13 |
| 4. | "Second Fear -Another Descendant-" | Kamijo | Teru | 3:13 |
| 5. | "Zombie" | Kamijo | Teru | 4:16 |
| 6. | "After Cloudia" | Kamijo | Hizaki | 5:14 |
| 7. | "Windress" | Kamijo | Hizaki | 4:25 |
| 8. | "The Revenant Choir" | Kamijo | Versailles | 6:18 |
| 9. | "Suzerain" | Kamijo | Hizaki | 4:35 |
| 10. | "History of the Other Side" | Kamijo | Hizaki | 9:54 |
| 11. | "Prince" | Kamijo | Hizaki | 5:57 |
| Total length: | | | | 61:00 |
