= Lyrical Sympathy Live =

Lyrical Sympathy -Live-

Live album by Versailles
- Released: September 1, 2010
- Genre: Symphonic metal, power metal, neo-classical metal
- Label: Sherow Artist Society

Versailles chronology
Lyrical Sympathy -Live- (2010)	Noble -Live- (2010)

Lyrical Symphony -Live- is a live album by Versailles, released on September 1, 2010. It is the live version of their EP Lyrical Sympathy, but also contains the bonus studio track "Sforzando", which was previously only available on the omnibus album Cross Gate 2008 -Chaotic Sorrow-.

== Track listing ==
No.	Title	Lyrics	Music	Length
1.	"Intro"		Kamijo	1:12
2.	"The Love from a Dead Orchestra"	Kamijo	Kamijo	8:44
3.	"Shout & Bites"	Kamijo	Kamijo	4:01
4.	"Beast of Desire"	Kamijo	Hizaki	4:37
5.	"Forbidden Gate"	Kamijo	Hizaki	4:41
6.	"The Red Carpet Day"	Kamijo	Teru	5:38
7.	"Sympathia"	Kamijo	Hizaki	6:16
8.	"Sforzando -Original Version-" (Studio recording)	Kamijo	Kamijo	4:57
Total length:				40:06

- "Sforzando -Original Version-" is not live, it's the version released in Cross Gate 2008 -Chaotic Sorrow. The title is also misleading as this is the only version released.
