= Jubilee (Versailles album) =

Studio album by Versailles
- Released: January 20, 2010
- Recorded: Warner Music Recording Studio & Studio Fine
- Genre: Symphonic power metal, neoclassical metal
- Length: 65:00
- Label: Warner Music Japan
- Producer: Versailles

Versailles chronology
Noble (2008)	Jubilee (2010)	Holy Grail (2011)

Singles from Jubilee
- 1. "Prince & Princess" Released: December 10, 2008; 2. "Ascendead Master" Released: June 24, 2009

Jubilee (full title Jubilee -Method of Inheritance-) is the major label debut album by Versailles, but is actually their second full-length release. Released on January 20, 2010, it is their last to feature all five original members; due to Jasmine You's death while recording it, bass parts are provided by both Jasmine You and Hizaki. Synthpop singer Kaya also appears in this album by providing backing vocals as a guest on the tracks "Ai to Kanashimi no Nocturne" and "Catharsis".

The limited edition comes in a special package with a 32-page booklet and liner notes written by Tsuchiya Kyousuke and Arasawa Junko (Shoxx). Also included in the limited edition is a bonus DVD featuring the music videos for "Ascendead Master" and "Serenade", and behind the scenes footage playing behind the credits.

== Track listing ==
Disc 1 (CD)
No.	Title	Lyrics	Music	Length
1.	"God Palace -Method of Inheritance-"	Kamijo	Kamijo	10:30
2.	"Ascendead Master"	Kamijo	Hizaki	5:49
3.	"Rosen Schwert"	Kamijo	Kamijo	4:10
4.	"Ai to Kanashimi no Nocturne" (愛と哀しみのノクターン)	Kamijo	Teru	4:54
5.	"Amorphous"	Kamijo	Hizaki	5:08
6.	"Reminiscence"		Teru	2:30
7.	"Catharsis"	Hizaki	Hizaki & Teru	6:05
8.	"The Umbrella of Glass"	Kamijo	Kamijo	4:23
9.	"Gekkakou" (月下香)	Hizaki	Hizaki	4:41
10.	"Princess -Revival of Church-"	Kamijo	Hizaki	8:16
11.	"Serenade"	Kamijo	Hizaki	5:58
12.	"Sound in Gate"	Kamijo	Kamijo	2:36
Total length:				65:00

Disc 2 (DVD, Japanese Edition)
No.	Title	Length
1.	"Ascendead Master" (Music video)
2.	"Serenade" (Music video)
3.	"Making of" (Clips from the making of the PVs)
