= Prince & Princess =

Single by Versailles

from the album Jubilee
- Released: December 10, 2008
- Genre: Power metal, symphonic metal, neoclassical metal
- Length: 19:52
- Label: Sherow Artist Society
- Songwriter(s): Kamijo & Hizaki

Versailles Singles singles chronology
"A Noble Was Born in Chaos" (2008)	"Prince & Princess" (2008)	"Ascendead Master" (2009)

"Prince & Princess" is the third single from Versailles, released on December 10, 2008. The single was released in six different versions; five with a different member on the cover and one regular edition with the whole group on the cover plus the bonus track "Silent Knight". This version of "Prince" is slightly different from the one that was first distributed free of charge on the band's website and then added to the October 22 reissue of their first album, Noble. "Princess" is featured on the band's second album Jubilee, albeit as the re-recording "Princess -Revival of Church-".

== Track listing ==
No.	Title	Lyrics	Music	Length
1.	"Prince"	Kamijo	Kamijo & Hizaki	5:28
2.	"Princess"	Kamijo	Hizaki	8:24
3.	"Silent Knight" (only on the regular edition)		Hizaki	6:01
Total length:				19:53
