= Izabel Varosa =

Japanese visual kei rock band

Izabel Varosa is a Japanese visual kei rock band. They were formed by KAZUI (g) and Chihiro (g) in 2004 and were picked up in 2005 by Applause Records, an indies label run by Lareine's vocalist, Kamijo. To date, Izabel Varosa have released one single, three maxi-singles and two mini-albums. In August 2006, Hikaru (vo), Chihiro (g), and Emi (ba) left the band due to musical differences, which resulted in the release of the band's first full-length album being cancelled. Despite there only being one remaining member, the Izabel Varosa has yet to make any sort of official disbandment announcement.

On November 13, 2015, bands former drummer Fuma (楓舞) died due to intracerebral hemorrhage.

== Members ==
=== Current members ===
Guitar: KAZUI

=== Former Members ===
Vocals: HIKARU
Guitar: Chihiro (千尋)
Bass: Emi (淮魅)
Drums: Fuuma (楓舞)

== Releases ==
=== Albums ===
Hikami no Bigaku (氷上の美学)
06.09.2005

01. Deep Breath
02. Ambition
03. Tsuioku no Tobira (追憶の扉)
04. Camouflage (カモフラージュ)
05. Squall
06. Remain ~Hitori Dake no Toki~ (Remain～ひとつだけの詩～)

Justice
07.30.2006

01. An Scene of Sorrow
02. Juliet
03. Fake
04. Ready?
05. Shin Sekai (新世界)

Imitation Think
08.27.2006

Release Cancelled

=== Singles ===
Imitation Mercy/Seasonal Wind
release date unknown; event-only distribution

01. Imitation Mercy
02. Seasonal Wind

Gekkou (月光)
10.13.2005

01. Gekkou (月光)
02. Falling You
03. Hikami no Bigaku (氷上の美学)

Kyou
03.14.2005

01. Mousou Te XXX to (妄想テ×××ト)
02. Deadly Rave
03. Seasonal Wind

Juliet
06.25.2006

01. Juliet
02. Juliet (Instrumental Version)

The vocalist, HIKARU, took part in HIZAKI's project. While he was with HIZAKI they took part in a split EP with +ISOLATION. The first two songs belong to HIZAKI and the last two belong to +ISOLATION. And the second track "Cradle" is an instrumental track without HIKARU's vocal.

Unique
01. Solitude
02. Cradle
03. Dead End
04. Yobou Sesshu
