= Jasmine You =

Japanese bassist (1979–2009)

- Promotional photograph of Jasmine You

Background information
- Also known as: Jasmine You, Yuu (勇)
- Born: March 8, 1979; Aichi, Japan
- Died: August 9, 2009 (aged 30) Tokyo, Japan
- Genres: Power metal; symphonic metal; gothic metal; neoclassical metal
- Occupation: Musician
- Instrument: Bass guitar
- Years active: 1998–2009
- Formerly of: Jakura; Node of Scherzo; Hizaki Grace Project; Versailles

Jasmine You (March 8, 1979 – August 9, 2009) was a Japanese musician, best known as original bassist of the symphonic power metal band Versailles. Jasmine You, then known as Yuu, entered the visual kei music scene in 1998 after joining Jakura, who managed to become somewhat successful before disbanding in 2003. In 2006 he was invited by his long-time friend Hizaki to join his solo project. Soon after he also took part in the theatrical rock show Node of Scherzo, with Hizaki, Kamijo, Juka and Kaya. In 2007 he joined Versailles and stayed with them until his illness and death in 2009.

== Biography ==
=== Jakura ===
Jasmine You was born in Aichi Prefecture. He formed the band Jakura (雀羅) in March 1998, under the name Yuu (勇). After Jakura disbanded on June 9, 2003, he decided not to join a full-time band and played in some session bands. In June 2006 he moved to Tokyo, and his long-time friend Hizaki invited him to join his solo project Hizaki grace project.

=== Versailles ===
In 2007, Hizaki and Kamijo (ex-Lareine) came together to create Versailles and, according to some interviews, Jasmine You became a member without being formally asked. He was hanging around with Kamijo and Hizaki a lot at the time and it just felt natural to have him in the band. In the indies days Jasmine was in charge of the business side of the band, having a lot of contacts with other musicians, shops and companies. At the same time he was working with Hizaki grace project and Kamijo's project Node of Scherzo, which also consisted of Hizaki, Juka and Kaya. In June 2009, Versailles went major on Warner Music Japan with their single "Ascendead Master". Versailles released five singles, one mini-album and one full-album before Jasmine You's death.

=== Death ===
On August 3, 2009, it was announced that Jasmine You would temporarily suspend all musical activities, due to unknown circumstances regarding his health, in order to recover. It had been announced that Versailles' new album Jubilee was in the final stages of production and the bass tracks were being recorded.

In the early hours of August 9, 2009, it was reported on Versailles' official website that Jasmine You had died. The translated announcement reads as follows:

"2009.8.9 「Versailles」 Urgent Announcement: Though Jasmine You had taken time off in order to rest because of poor physical condition, we received a report that early in the morning on August 9, he died. Because of the extreme abruptness of this news, the members and staff are all dumbfounded and trying hard to accept this it. As soon as his family has been notified and updated as to the details and we receive their permission, we will further report to all of the fans. Moreover, with the current announcement, in regards to activity, please allow us to postpone it."

Versailles now cites Jasmine You as an "eternal member". Almost a year after his death, in an announcement of a tribute in his honor, the cause of death was still undisclosed by his family.

=== Posthumous ===
Fans in the United States held four memorial vigils throughout the country for Jasmine You on August 22, 2009; in New York, California, Washington and Texas.

On January 4, 2010, Versailles held the Jasmine You -Memorial Ceremony- at Shibuya O-East, where themselves, Kaya and Matenrou Opera performed.

Versailles' 2011 album, Holy Grail, features the songs "Remember Forever" and "Faith & Decision" which are dedicated to Jasmine You.

On the second anniversary of his death, his former Versailles bandmate Teru composed and dedicated the song "「For You」" to Jasmine You.

== Discography ==
=== With Jakura ===
Albums and EPs

- Jubaku to Fufu Tokage no Kakugo+3 (呪縛ト不フ吐陰の赫檎+3; April 15, 2002)
- Sora o Kura fu Tokage (空ヲ喰らフ吐陰; September 12, 2003)

Singles

- "Marii no Kakugo" (マリィの赫檎; April 25, 2001)
- "San ni Majiwaru Jikkai -Hebi Ichigo no Kanjou Trip-" (参ニ混ジワル十戒～蛇苺ノ感傷トリップ～; October 10, 2001)
- "San ni Majiwaru Jikkai -Katame no Shoujo ni Jojou Drug-" (参ニ混ジワル十戒～片目ノ少女に叙情ドラッグ～; November 11, 2001)
- "San ni Majiwaru Jikkai -Kaigoroshi Romanzai-" (参ニ混ジワル十戒～飼イ殺シ浪漫剤～; December 12, 2001)
- "Russian Roulette Kara no Seikansha" (ロシアンルーレットからの生還者; September 25, 2002)
- "Naki Tomanu Aka" (鳴き止まぬ赤; December 22, 2002)
- "Aieki de Nureta... Joukan" (愛液で濡れた・・・上巻; April 14, 2003)
- "Aieki de Nureta... Gekan" (愛液で濡れた・・・下巻; June 14, 2003)

Demos

- "Taiji" (胎児; August 12, 1998)
- "Jubaku to Fufu Hiro no Akumu" (呪縛ト不フ緋色ノ悪夢; June 23, 2000)
- "Three Flat" (すりぃふらっと; February 28, 2001)

Videos

- Ura Bake Neko Hakusho (裏化け猫白書; October 4, 2001, fan club only)
- Russian Roulette Kara no Seikansha - Gekijouban (ロシアンルーレットからの生還者・劇場版; 2002, fan club only)

Omnibuses

- B.J. Maniac (June 20, 2001, with "Jakura Shizenshuu")
- Shock Edge 2001 (September 29, 2001, with "Sonzai")
- Yougenkyou II: Bewicthing Illusion Mirror (April 6, 2005, with "Katame no Shoujo (Yougenkyou Mix)")

=== With Hizaki grace project ===
Hizaki grace project discography
