= Rose (Versailles song) =

Single by Versailles
- Released: July 4, 2012
- Genre: Symphonic metal, power metal
- Label: Warner Music Japan
- Songwriter(s): Kamijo, Hizaki
- Producer(s): Versailles

Versailles Singles singles chronology
"Rhapsody of the Darkness" (2012)	"Rose" (2012)

"Rose" is the eighth single by Versailles. It was released on July 4, 2012, in commemoration of their fifth anniversary. The single includes a Japanese-language recording of "Love Will Be Born Again", taken from their third album Holy Grail, while the fourth song, "The Red Carpet Day", is a rerecording from their debut EP Lyrical Sympathy.

== Track listing ==
No.	Title	Lyrics	Music	Length
1.	"Rose"	Kamijo	Hizaki	5:25
2.	"Ayakashi" (妖 -ayakashi-)	Kamijo	Masashi	4:37
3.	"Love Will Be Born Again (Japanese Version)"	Kamijo	Kamijo	4:25
4.	"The Red Carpet Day"	Kamijo	Teru	4:24
