= A Noble Was Born in Chaos =

Single by Versailles

from the album Noble
- Released: March 19, 2008
- Recorded: Applause Records Studio, Bazooka Studio
- Genre: Power metal, neoclassical metal, symphonic metal
- Length: 14:27
- Label: Sherow Artist Society
- Songwriter(s): Kamijo

Versailles Singles singles chronology
"The Revenant Choir" (2007)	"A Noble Was Born in Chaos" (2008)	"Prince & Princess" (2008)

"A Noble Was Born in Chaos" is the second single by Versailles. The single was distributed exclusively at a concert at Shibuya-AX on March 19, 2008. All three songs would later be on the band's debut album Noble.

== Track listing ==
No.	Title	Lyrics	Music	Length
1.	"Aristocrat's Symphony"	Kamijo	Kamijo	6:15
2.	"Suzerain"	Kamijo	Hizaki	4:20
3.	"Zombie"	Kamijo	Teru	3:52
Total length:				14:27
