= Shaura =

- Also known as: Juka
- Born: October 4, 1981 (age 44); Yamaguchi
- Origin: Japan
- Genres: Symphonic metal, gothic metal, power metal, industrial metal, alternative metal
- Occupation: Singer
- Instrument: Vocals
- Years active: 2002–2012
- Labels: midi:nette, Sherow Artist Society

Shaura, formerly known as Juka (ジュカ), (born October 4, 1981), is a Japanese visual kei metal singer who first became known in 2002 when he was recruited by Mana for his project Moi dix Mois. In late 2006 he joined HIZAKI's solo project, HIZAKI grace project. He then started a solo career before pausing all musical activities at the end of 2007. He returned in 2009, after changing his stage name to Shaura, as part of the duo XOVER. After his last band VII-Sense disbanded in mid-2012, in August 2012 he officially wrote on his blog that his music career is finished and there was no reason for him to get back on stage now that he had taken up fishing.

== Activities ==
=== Moi dix Mois ===
In 2002, Juka was recruited to join Mana's project, Moi dix Mois. Like his band colleague Kazuno he was a newcomer to the Japanese music scene. While Juka was in Moi dix Mois, they produced three singles, two albums and two live DVDs as well as countless live concerts with the band, even in Germany and France. Juka left Moi dix Mois right after the Invite to Immorality Tour Final concert on April 30, 2005. The official reason given for his departure was musical differences. As a result of lacking a vocalist, Mana's fellow band members Kazuno and Tohru also decided to leave the band soon after. From there, Moi dix Mois had to be formed completely anew.

On March 20, 2013, he made an appearance as part of the encore of the final show of Moi dix Moi's Le Dixieme Anniversaire Live 2012-2013 tour performing a short set as part of a reunited original line up of the group followed by a second encore where they were joined on stage by the group's current members for a performance of the title track of the Pageant single.

=== HIZAKI grace project ===
At the end of 2006, guitarist HIZAKI recruited Juka as vocalist for solo project, HIZAKI grace project. In early 2007 they released a new album named Dignity of Crest. A live DVD named Monshou was released on May 5, 2007. It contains the complete live footage of HIZAKI grace project's tour final concert on February 17. They released a second album called Ruined Kingdom on September 19 which contained some live tracks and three new songs, which are the last recordings featuring Juka. He officially left the band after the concert at Omotesandou Fab on October 5, 2007. During the "Nihon Tanbi Kakumei" tour in November 2007, Juka performed as support vocalist along with Kamijo and Kaya.

=== Solo career ===
In the middle of February 2007 Juka announced the start of his solo career on Kamijo's record label Sherow Artist Society, while continuing activities with HIZAKI grace project. He also announced the release of his first maxi single "Aravesque" on March 28, 2007, which was produced by Kamijo, HIZAKI and Juka himself. The three tracks provide a large style selection. While the first song "Aravesque" is reminiscent of Moi dix Mois' gothic sound, the second track "S" leans in the direction of heavy metal music. The third track "Aimless" has much in common with a French chanson and doesn't share any kind of style with either of the first two tracks. Furthermore, all tracks are instrumental. Another release called Luxurious in the shape of a mini album was released in June 2007. He released his second single "Saint Croix" on October 31, 2007. Juka announced he would be pausing all musical activities at the end of 2007 due to personal matters; all future plans were on hold/cancelled.

=== Node of Scherzo ===
In March 2007, the Node of Scherzo (ノード・オブ・スケルツォ) event took place. Juka takes the role of vocalist alongside Kamijo and Kaya while HIZAKI and Jasmine You support the three on guitar and bass. According to Kamijo, the show is supposed to be a theatrical show combined with music and illumination effects. While Juka and Jasmine You represent the dark side, Kamijo and HIZAKI form their opposite as the light side. Between them stands Kaya personifying beauty. A certain focus is cast on the tragic love story of Juka and Jasmine You. When the three vocalists performed a new specifically created song at the end of the show, the song found so much approval of the audience, that they decided after a second Node of Scherzo show in May 2007 to record this song on a CD. It was finally released on October 31, 2007. The buyers of all Halloween releases by the labels Reverie and Sherow Artist Society, which were "Carmilla" (by Kaya), "Saint Croix" (by Juka), Lyrical Sympathy (by Versailles) and the "Node of Scherzo" single, were given the possibility to obtain a special live clip DVD by sending all the coupons found on the obi slips wrapped around the CD case and five 80 Yen stamps to the label by December 12, 2007. The DVD contained a 5 minutes live clip accompanied with the Node of Scherzo song. Further performances of the song could be seen during the national tour "Nihon Tanbi Kakumei".

=== XOVER ===
XOVER was a duo formed in 2009 with Kouichi (Everlasting-K, ex:Laputa), and marked Juka's return to music after changing his stage-name to Shaura. XOVER released one mini-album titled XGATE on July 22, 2009. They then released an album called Aureola on October 21. But after releasing a live DVD in November 2009, XOVER disbanded.

=== VII-Sense ===
Seventh Sense was intended to be a new band by Juka and fellow ex:Moi dix Mois member Kazuno. However, due to Juka withdrawing himself from the music scene, this band was canceled and the Omnibus album that Seventh Sense would have been featured on now features Juka's song "Suimenka" instead. Juka would release a "best of" album on February 6, 2008, called Seventh Sense.

In 2010 Seventh Sense was finally formed, stylized as VII-Sense. Their first release was the single "Black Bird" on March 24. The other members included guitarists Erina (ex:Dio – Distraught Overlord) and RayX, Kaz on guitar and piano, bassist Masato (ex:support for XOVER) and Mikage on drums (ex:Hizaki Grace Project, Kisaki Project). In May 2012, the band disbanded.

On August 28, Shaura wrote on personal blog that he would not return to the music scene. The entry was deleted and Shaura instead wrote that he wanted to make new band. However, this entry was also deleted.

== Discography ==
Earlier activities:

- see: Moi dix Mois
- see: HIZAKI grace project

Solo as Juka

- "Aravesque" (March 28, 2007)
- Luxurious (June 13, 2007)
- "Suimenka" (水面華, October 5, 2007, sold only at concert at Omotesando Fab)
- "Saint Croix" (October 31, 2007)
- Ura Kizoku "Nihon Tanbi Kakumei" Tour Documentary DVD (裏貴族"日本耽美革命"ツアードキュメンタリーDVD, December 2007)
- Seventh Sense (February 6, 2008, compilation album)

XOVER

- XGATE (July 22, 2009)
- Aureola (October 21, 2009)

VII-Sense

- "Black Bird" (March 24, 2010)
- "Sexual Desire" (June 22, 2010, freely distributed at concerts only)
- "Cell Division" (July 28, 2010)
- The Reminiscence of War (April 20, 2011)
