= Heartstrings (Aisenshi album) =

Studio album by Aisenshi
- Released: June 5, 2013
- Recorded: 2013
- Genre: Heavy metal; anison
- Length: 39:26
- Language: Japanese
- Label: Metallic Core

Heartstrings is the debut studio album by Japanese novelty heavy metal band Aisenshi, released through Metallic Core on June 5, 2013. Released as the spiritual successor to lead vocalist Eizo Sakamoto's previous band Animetal, the album features metal covers of various anime theme songs.

The album peaked at No. 296 on Oricon's weekly albums chart.

== Track listing ==
No.	Title	Original anime	Length
1.	"Nadia" (Instrumental)		2:37
2.	"Getter Robo Go" (Gettā Robo Gō (ゲッターロボ號))	Getter Robo Go	4:12
3.	"Grand Prix no Taka" (Guranpuri no Taka (ランプリの鷹; "Hawk of the Grand Prix"))	Arrow Emblem: Hawk of the Grand Prix	4:31
4.	"UFO Senshi Dai Apolon" (Yūfō Senshi Daiaporon (UFO戦士ダイアポロン; "UFO Warrior Dai Apolon"))	UFO Senshi Dai Apolon	4:38
5.	"Inishie" ((いにしえ; "Ancient"))		4:46
6.	"Karate Baka Ichidai" ((空手バカ一代; "A Karate-Crazy Life"))	Karate Baka Ichidai	3:42
7.	"Iron Leaguer: Kagirinaki Shimei" (Aian Rīgā ~Kagirinaki Shimei~ (アイアンリーガー～限りなき使命～; "Iron Leaguer: Limitless Mission"))	Shippū! Iron Leaguer	3:29
8.	"L-Gaim - Time for L-Gaim" (Erugaimu -Time for L-GAIM- (エルガイム -Time for L-GAIM-))	Heavy Metal L-Gaim	4:02
9.	"Taga Tame ni" ((誰がために; "For Whose Sake"))	Cyborg 009	3:48
10.	"Z no Theme" (Zetto no Tēma (Zのテーマ; "Theme of Z"))	Mazinger Z	3:41
Total length:			39:26

== Personnel ==
- Eizo Sakamoto (さかもと えいぞう, Sakamoto Eizō) – lead vocals
- She-Ja (屍忌蛇, Shīja) – lead guitar
- Hiro – bass
- Katsuji – drums

== Charts ==
Chart (2013)	Peak position
Japanese Albums (Oricon)	296
