= Dix Infernal =

Dix infernal

Studio album by Moi dix Mois
- Released: March 19, 2003
- Length: 44:48
- Label: Midi:Nette
- Producer: Mana

Moi dix Mois chronology
Dix infernal (2003)	Nocturnal Opera (2004)

Dix infernal is the first album by Moi dix Mois and was released on March 19, 2003. "Tentation" and "Pessimiste" were re-recorded on the Dixanadu album.

== Track listing ==
All tracks are written by Mana.

No.	Title	Length
1.	"Dix infernal"	0:42
2.	"La dix croix"	5:06
3.	"front et baiser"	4:30
4.	"Ange"	3:59
5.	"tentation"	5:36
6.	"Solitude"	3:57
7.	"Pessimiste"	3:47
8.	"Gloire dans le silence"	3:19
9.	"L'intérieur Dix"	0:42
10.	"Détresse"	4:35
11.	"Priére"	3:34
12.	"Dialogue Symphonie-x"	3:10
13.	"Dix Est Infini"	0:28

All songs written by Mana.
