= Destiny -The Lovers- =

Single by Versailles

from the album Holy Grail
- Released: October 27, 2010
- Genre: Power metal, symphonic metal, neoclassical metal
- Length: 15:40
- Label: Warner Music Japan
- Songwriter: Kamijo
- Producer: Versailles

Versailles Singles singles chronology
"Ascendead Master" (2009)	"Destiny -The Lovers-" (2010)	"Philia" (2011)

"Destiny -The Lovers-" is the fifth single by Versailles, released on October 27, 2010. This is the band's first single to feature new bassist Masashi. The single came in three editions: a regular with just the CD and two limited editions each with a different cover and DVD. The first included live performances from their concert at Tokyo's JCB Hall on April 30, 2010, the other has the promotional video for the title track. The version that appears on Holy Grail has an orchestrated intro.

== Track listing ==
No.	Title	Lyrics	Music	Length
1.	"Destiny -The Lovers-"	Kamijo	Kamijo	5:47
2.	"Glowing Butterfly"	Kamijo	Hizaki	5:51
3.	"Libido"	Kamijo	Teru	4:02
Total length:				15:40

Limited Edition I DVD
No.	Title	Lyrics	Music	Length
1.	"Ai to Kanashimi no Nocturne" (愛と哀しみのノクターン)	Kamijo	Teru
2.	"Amorphous"	Kamijo	Hizaki
3.	"Gekkakou" (月下香)	Hizaki	Hizaki
4.	"Serenade"	Kamijo	Hizaki
5.	"Ascendead Master"	Kamijo	Hizaki
6.	"God Palace"	Kamijo	Kamijo

Limited Edition II DVD
No.	Title	Lyrics	Music	Length
1.	"Destiny -The Lovers- (PV)"	Kamijo	Kamijo
