= Dixanadu =

Studio album by Moi dix Mois
- Released: March 28, 2007
- Genre: Gothic metal, industrial metal
- Length: 40:12
- Label: Midi:Nette; Trisol
- Producer: Mana

Moi dix Mois chronology
Beyond the Gate (2006)	Dixanadu (2007)	D+SECT (2010)

Dixanadu is an album released by Moi dix Mois on March 28, 2007. It contains re-recordings of "Tentation" ("Last Temptation") and "Pessimiste" ("Neo Pessimist"), originally from the album Dix Infernal.

== Style ==
The album features Gothic metal combined with traditional Japanese elements of song. The guitar riffs have been compared to those of Slayer. Another element is using twin guitars with a tonal shift of a fourth.

== Reception ==
The German magazine Sonic Seducer called the album a milestone of J-Rock and the dark culture in general. The reviewer also noted that the melody lines were more internationally appealing than those in the band's previous releases, which would suit the European audience.

== Track listing ==
All tracks are written by Mana.

No.	Title	Length
1.	"Dispell Bound"	3:04
2.	"Angelica"	5:00
3.	"Metaphysical"	3:41
4.	"Exclude"	3:40
5.	"Last Temptation"	4:17
6.	"Immortal Madness"	1:22
7.	"Neo Pessimist"	3:48
8.	"Xanadu"	4:44
9.	"A Lapis Night's Dream (SE)"	0:28
10.	"Lamentful Miss"	3:48
11.	"Lilac of Damnation"	4:08
12.	"Sacred Lake (SE)"	1:35

== Versions ==
- A limited edition containing instrumental versions of all 12 tracks was available for pre-order through the Midi:Nette online store until August 20, 2007. It was being manufactured on an order-only basis, though it was also available during the European 2007 tour. It includes a "Matin" game, (Mana's cartoon alter-ego), and various desktop tools.
- A strictly limited to 499 copies of the LP was made available in Europe.
- A 2CD version containing the single "Lamentful Miss" was also available in Europe.
