= Kamijo (musician) =

Japanese singer

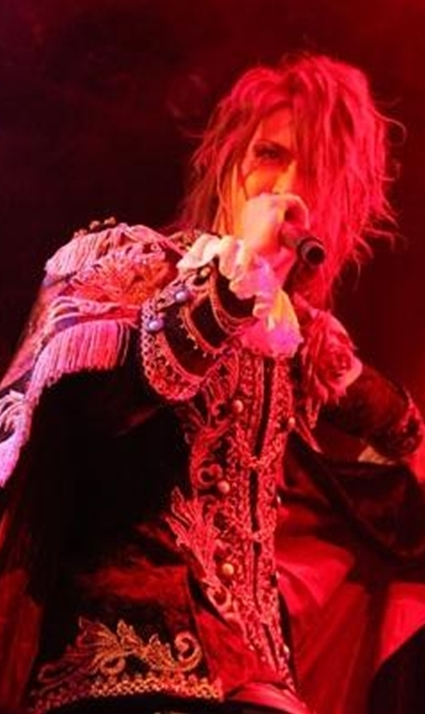
- Kamijo performing with Versailles in 2010

Background information
- Also known as: Shoki
- Born: Yuji Kamijo; July 19; Hiratsuka, Kanagawa, Japan
- Genres: Power metal; symphonic metal; neoclassical metal; rock (early)
- Occupations: Singer; songwriter
- Years active: 1994–present
- Member of: Versailles
- Formerly of: Lareine
- Website: www.kamijo.club

Yuji Kamijo, known mononymously as Kamijo, is a Japanese singer. He is best known as lead singer of the visual kei bands Lareine and Versailles. He has also been the head of two independent record labels; the first being Applause Records (formed in 2000), and currently Chateau Agency, which was formerly known as Sherow Artist Society from 2006 to 2016.

Kamijo began his music career in 1994 with the rock band Lareine. After 13 years, including a brief period where he was the sole member and also formed the short-lived band New Sodmy, Kamijo ended Lareine in 2006. He then co-founded the symphonic power metal band Versailles in 2007. When they paused activities in 2012, Kamijo began a solo career the following year. Versailles resumed activities in December 2015.

== Early life ==
Kamijo was raised in a family of musicians; his mother and grandmother were both piano players, and his grandfather a violinist. He has cited Paul Mauriat, X Japan and Kyosuke Himuro as influences. His first steps in rock music were in the mid-1990s, when he worked as a roadie for the visual kei rock band Malice Mizer. He shared this job with Mayu, a guitarist with whom he formed the band Lareine.

== Career ==
=== 1994–2007: Lareine ===
In August 1994, Kamijo and Mayu (then using the names Shoki and Kaito respectively) met for the first time while were working as roadies for Malice Mizer. In November of that year, they decided to form a band together, which they named Laliene. Along with guitarist Sakuren and drummer Kyouka, they began to play. Later, bass player Emiru entered the band, completing the first line-up.

In March 1996, Laliene held a live concert for their first anniversary, where they changed the name of the band to Lareine. That same year they released their first recording "Saikai no Hana", distributed freely at the anniversary concert in a limited number of 100 copies. They signed with Sony Music Japan in 1998 and released the songs "Metamorphose", "Fiançailles", "Fuyu Tokyo" and "Lillie Charlotte". After years of releasing albums, EPs and singles, during a short separation of Lareine, Kamijo created the band New Sodmy, and recorded two albums and five singles. New Sodmy disbanded while Lareine was reformed in 2003 and started releasing new material.

Lareine finally came to its end, after having played their last live on October 31, 2006. The last recording of Lareine consists of 10 piano versions of their most popular songs.

=== 2007–2012: Versailles ===
In March 2007, Kamijo and Hizaki (ex–Sulfuric Acid), and Jasmine You (ex-Jakura), formed the power metal band Versailles. Later, Teru (ex-Aikaryu) and Yuki (ex-Sugar Trip), who were recommended by the Rock May Kan venue in Tokyo, joined the band. Hizaki, Jasmine You and Teru previously played together as part of Hizaki Grace Project.

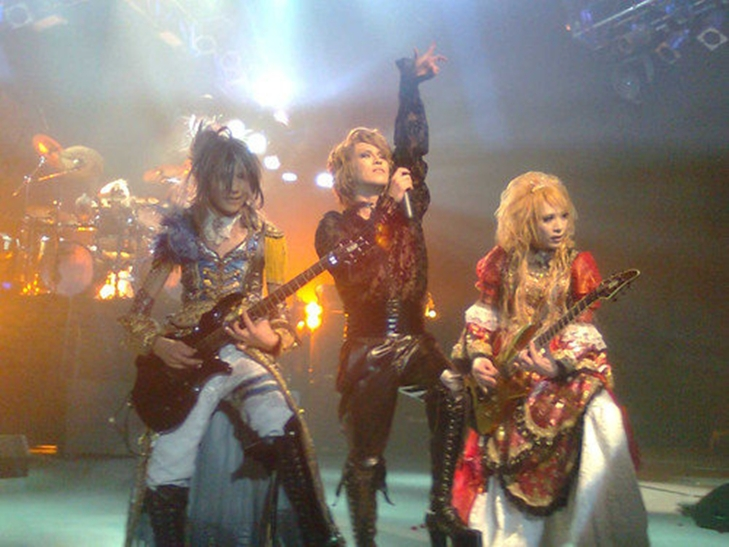
Kamijo (center) performing with Versailles in Santiago, Chile, in 2010

Kamijo and Hizaki created the concept of Versailles in the autumn of 2006 and spent six months gathering members to express it. Their band concept is "the absolute youshikibi (beauty of form) sound and extremes of aestheticism". On March 30, 2007 the details of the band were announced. They released promotional material through the internet, set up an English language page on MySpace, and had several interviews with foreign press. Versailles made their first appearance with a showcase on June 23, followed by their first performance on June 24. On these dates they also distributed their first single and DVD single, "The Revenant Choir".

The band signed with the German CLJ Records label and released the EP Lyrical Sympathy on October 31, both in Japan and Europe. Their song "The Love From A Dead Orchestra" also appeared on a compilation album released by Sony BMG in Germany on November 9, called Tokyo Rock City. On September 23, 2008, Kamijo modeled clothing for the brand Alice and the Pirates on the runway at Individual Fashion Expo IV.

In January 2011, he and the rest of Versailles started starring in their own TV mini drama called Onegai Kanaete Versailles (おねがいかなえてヴェルサイユ; "Fulfill My Wish Versailles"). The show also starred Rina Koike and aired on Mainichi Broadcasting System and TV Kanagawa until March. On December 20, 2012, Versailles gave their last concert and ceased all activities. The band released four albums, one EP, eight singles, two live albums, ten music videos, one compilation albums and several DVDs.

=== 2013–present: Solo career and Versailles ===
In January 2013, Kamijo announced he would start a solo career, with his first release being the single "Louis ~Enketsu no La Vie en Rose~" on August 28. While all the other members of Versailles later formed the band Jupiter with a new singer, and released their first album the same day as Kamijo's single. The music video for Kamijo's single features Malice Mizer and Moi dix Mois leader Mana. Kamijo also sang backup on the 2013 debut album Heartstrings by Aisenshi, the new band of Eizo Sakamoto (Anthem) and She-Ja (Volcano).

For his December 28, 2015 concert at Zepp DiverCity, which was the finale of a world tour that celebrated his 20th anniversary as a musician, Kamijo recruited multiple members of his former bands to perform with him. This included a reunited Versailles and New Sodmy, and the classic lineup of Lareine. Versailles then fully resumed activities on August 7, 2016. In September 2018, Kamijo was one of three guest vocalists who performed with Malice Mizer for their 25th anniversary reunion concerts.

In August 2024, Kamijo announced he would be relocating his base of operations to Los Angeles, California in summer 2025 in order to learn film music production in Hollywood and to study under a specific vocal coach.

In February 2026, Kamijo announced he would perform his first solo concert since relocating to Los Angeles, titled Sanctum of the Damned, in July of the same year. Kamijo also announced the tour Sanctuary of Europe, to take place in September to October 2026.

== Discography ==
Solo

Studio albums and mini-albums

- Symphony of the Vampire (March 5, 2014; mini-album)
- Heart (September 24, 2014)
- Sang (March 21, 2018)
- Oscar (October 23, 2022)
- Violet Dawn (July 31, 2024; mini-album)

Other albums

- 20th Anniversary All Time Best ~Kakumei no Keifu~ (20th Anniversary All Time Best ～革命の系譜～; June 10, 2015; compilation album)
- Royal Blood -Revival Best- (July 15, 2015; self-cover album)
- Dream Live "Symphony of The Vampire" Kamijo with Orchestra (July 17, 2019; live album)

Singles

- "Louis ~Enketsu no La Vie en Rose~" (Louis ～艶血のラヴィアンローズ～; August 28, 2013)
- "Moulin Rouge" (June 18, 2014)
- "Yamiyo no Lion" (闇夜のライオン; July 16, 2014)
- "Castrato" (カストラート; May 10, 2017)
- "Mademoiselle" (September 27, 2017)
- "Nosferatu" (January 16, 2018)
- "Sang -Another Story-" (March 21, 2018)
- "Sang ~Kimi ni Okuru Namae~" (Sang ～君に贈る名前～; July 18, 2018)
- "Eye of Providence" (July 24, 2019)
- "Temple ~Blood Sucking for Praying~" (November 27, 2019)
- "Symbol of the Dragon" (February 26, 2020)
- "Persona Grata" (April 29, 2020)
- "Behind the Mask" (August 31, 2021)
- "Utsukushi Hibi no Kakera" (美しい日々の欠片; January 31, 2024)

With New Sodmy

- Confess to a Crime (2002)
- Confess to a Love (2002)
