= Madeth Gray'll =

Japanese visual kei rock band

- Madeth Gray'll in 2000. Clockwise from bottom left: Yukina, Reika, Airi, Izumi, Hisui

Background information
- Origin: Japan
- Genres: Rock
- Years active: 1997–2001
- Label: Matina
- Past members: Hisui; Yukina; Reika; Airi; Hizumi; Shizuru; Tsubaki; Izumi; Ukyou
- Logo

Madeth Gray'll (stylized as Madeth gray'll) were a Japanese visual kei rock band active from 1997 to 2001. They are credited with helping to establish the Matina record label.

== History ==
The band was formed in 1997 with vocalist Kei (later known as Hisui), bassist Yukina, guitarists Shizuru and Hizumi. They did not have an official drummer until 1998. In November and December 1997, the band released four demo tapes.

At the start of 1998, vocalist Kei changed his stage name to Hisui. They released four more demo tapes in March and April 1998 (one was later re-released in June). On May 7, 1998, one of the band's guitarists, Hizumi, died in a car accident as he was travelling to attend the funeral of Hide, lead guitarist of X Japan.

Following Hizumi's death, Tsubaki officially joined the band as a drummer. In August 1998, Madeth Gray'll re-released their song "Hakuchu Yume no Sangeki" and released a music video for "Parasite". On August 10, 1998, the band released their first CD single, titled "Juujika no Ketsumatsu...". Months later, Shizuru and Tsubaki left the band, leaving Hisui and Yukina as the only remaining members.

In 1999, Madeth Gray'll signed with Matina, an independent record label started by Kisaki. They appeared on Matina's first compilation album, New Age Culture. Hisui and Yukina recruited new guitarist, Izumi. Together, they released the single "Juujika no Ketsumatsu ~Daini no Higeki~" on June 30, 1999, and "Mother Complex" in August of that year. Around this time, a second guitarist, Ukyou, joined the band. In October, they recruited drummer Reika.

Ukyou left the band at the start of 2000. They recruited a support guitarist, Airi. In March 2000, Madeth Gray'll released their first full-length album, Lucifer ~Makyou ni Utsuru Norowareta Zaijintachi to Seimei no Shuuen~. The album was a success and, in the following months, it was re-released twice.

Yukina decided to leave the band. The other members decided to completely disband, as they did not want to continue without him. Their upcoming disbandment was announced on November 28, 2000. The following day, they released an EP, Boukai no Mato ~Entith de Marge~. Airi became an official member of the band. Madeth Gray'll officially separated following a live show on January 29, 2001. They later released a memorial album. Reika went on to form the band Doremidan, while Airi formed the bands Crack Brain and Schwardix Marvally with Hizaki.

== Legacy ==
Kisaki credited Madeth Gray'll with attracting popularity towards the Matina record label. Their song "Lucifer" was covered by Hisui and Airi's band Schwardix Marvally in 2009.

== Members ==
=== Last lineup ===
- Hisui (翡翠) – vocals (1997–2001)
- Yukina (雪那) – bass (1997–2001)
- Reika (麗華) – drums (1999–2001)
- Airi (藍梨) – guitars (2000–2001)

=== Former members ===
- Hizumi (歪) – guitars (1997–1998)
- Shizuru (静流) – guitars (1997–1999)
- Tsubaki (椿) – drums (1998–1999)
- Izumi (泉) – guitars (1999–2001)
- Ukyou (右狂) – guitars (1999–2000)

== Discography ==
Studio albums and EPs

- Lucifer ~Makyou ni Utsuru Norowareta Zaijintachi to Seimei no Shuuen~ (2000)
- Boukai no Mato ~Entith de Marge~ (2000)

Singles

- "Juujika no Ketsumatsu..." (1998)
- "Juujika no Ketsumatsu ~Daini no Higeki~" (1999)
- "Mother Complex" (1999)

Compilations

- Madeth Gray'll ~Higeki no Shuumaku (2001)
