= Aisenshi =

Japanese heavy metal band

Aisenshi 哀旋士
- Origin: Japan
- Genres: Heavy metal; speed metal; power metal; anison
- Years active: 2013
- Labels: Metallic Core
- Members: Eizo Sakamoto; She-Ja; Katsuji; Hiro; Juhki

Aisenshi (哀旋士, lit. Soldiers of Sorrow) is a Japanese heavy metal band formed in 2013 by Eizo Sakamoto and She-Ja.

== History ==
Aisenshi serves as a spiritual successor to Sakamoto's previous project Animetal. Sakamoto claims that the spirit of what "Animetal" comprised has not died, but has since become more soulful and sorrowful, with the anime theme song covers they will perform now having such a tone to them. In an interview with Beeast, Sakamoto said that he had decided to reform Animetal with She-ja after the popularity of Animetal USA and after he had enjoyed performing on his solo project Eizo Japan, both in Japan and internationally. One of their first reunion concerts on June 29, 2013, at Osaka's Shinsaibashi Club Alive was met with praise, with the group performing both new tracks off of their album Heartstrings, released on June 5, 2013, as well as songs from their old Animetal repertoire and an original song "Homura" (焔, lit. "Flames of Passion"), that the band released as a single on December 10, 2013.

The band's members, aside from Sakamoto on vocals and She-Ja on guitar, include Gusty Bombs' bassist Hiro, Animetal's former drummer Katsuji, and Juhki from the dōjin music circle "IRON ATTACK!".

== Personnel ==
- Eizo Sakamoto (さかもと えいぞう, Sakamoto Eizō) – lead vocals
- She-Ja (屍忌蛇, Shīja) – lead guitar
- Hiro – bass
- Katsuji – drums

== Discography ==
=== Albums ===
Title	Album details	Peak chart positions	Sales
Title	Album details	JPN Oricon	Sales
Heartstrings	Released: June 5, 2013; Label: Metallic Core; Formats: CD, digital	296	

=== Singles ===
List of singles, with selected chart positions
Title	Year	Peak chart positions	Certifications	Sales	Album
Title	Year	JPN Oricon	Certifications	Sales	Album
"Homura"	2013	—			Non-album single
"—" denotes a recording that did not chart or was not released in that territory.

=== Videos ===
List of media, with selected chart positions
Title	Year	Peak positions	
Title	Year	JPN DVD	JPN Blu-ray
Tour Live: 2013.7.5 Rocktown -Osaka-	Released: November 20, 2013; Label: Metallic Core; Formats: DVD	—	—
The Live - Densetsu no Animetal Debut Live Kanzen Saigen	Released: July 28, 2014; Label: Metallic Core; Formats: DVD	—	—
"—" denotes a recording that did not chart or was not released in that territory.
