= Philia (song) =

Single by Versailles

from the album Holy Grail
- Released: March 16, 2011
- Genre: Power metal, symphonic metal
- Length: 14:14
- Label: Warner Music Japan
- Songwriter(s): Kamijo, Hizaki
- Producer(s): Versailles & Keiichi Takahashi

Versailles Singles singles chronology
"Destiny -The Lovers-" (2010)	"Philia" (2011)	"Rhapsody of the Darkness" (2012)

"Philia" is the sixth single by Versailles, released on March 16, 2011. The title track was used as the theme song to the TV show Onegai Kanaete Versailles, which starred the band themselves. The single came in three editions, each with a different cover: a regular with just the CD, and two limited editions each with a different DVD. The first included live performances from their concert at Shibuya C.C. Lemon Hall on September 4, 2010, the other has a promotional video for the title track that is different from the one used to promote on TV.

== Track listing ==
No.	Title	Lyrics	Music	Length
1.	"Philia"	Kamijo	Hizaki	5:58
2.	"Judicial Noir"	Kamijo	Hizaki	4:20
3.	"Desert Apple"		Hizaki	3:56
Total length:				14:14

Limited Edition I DVD
No.	Title	Lyrics	Music	Length
1.	"Rosen Schwert"	Kamijo	Kamijo
2.	"Princess -Revival of Church-"	Kamijo	Hizaki
3.	"Catharsis"	Hizaki	Hizaki & Teru
4.	"Reminiscence"		Teru
5.	"Desert Apple"		Hizaki
6.	"Aristocrat's Symphony"	Kamijo	Kamijo
7.	"Sympathia"	Kamijo	Hizaki

Limited Edition II DVD
No.	Title	Lyrics	Music	Length
1.	"Philia (PV)"	Kamijo	Hizaki
