= Aikaryu =

Japanese visual kei metal band

- Origin: Kyoto, Japan
- Genres: Power metal
- Years active: 2002–2007
- Labels: Crow Music
- Members: Kaworu; Daiki; Uri; Teru; Shagrath
- Past members: Death; Amare; Takamasa

Aikaryu (藍華柳, Aikaryū) was a Japanese visual kei power metal band formed in 2002 by Kaworu, Daiki, Uri, Amare, and Death. Guitarist Death soon left and was replaced by Teru. Amare left the group after their first single and was replaced by Takamasa, whom left himself in 2005. Shagrath took his place, but the band suffered a car accident in 2006 which left most of its members seriously injured. Though most of them recovered, drummer Uri was never able to play decently again. Since the band did not have the intention of carrying on without him, they announced their end in 2007.

== Members ==
Last line-up

- Kaworu (カヲル) – vocals (2002–2007)
- Daiki (だいき) – bass (2002–2007)
- Uri – drums (2002–2007)
- Teru – guitar (2002–2007)
- Shagrath – guitar (2005–2007)

Former members

- Death – guitar (2002)
- Amare – guitar (2002–2003)
- Takamasa – guitar (2003–2005)

== Discography ==
Albums & EPs

- Kaizokuban ~Aye.Ai.sir~ (海賊盤～Aye.藍.sir～; August 9, 2004)
- Aikaryu Chokki Arubamu ~Oretachi Best Yori Chokki ha~ (藍華柳チョッキアルバム～俺達ベストよりチョッキ派～; June 29, 2007, compilation album)

Singles

- "Aizome Kyoto ~Ore Iro ni Somaru Kimi ga Aho ni Natteyuku...~" (藍染京都～俺色に染まる君がアホになってゆく...～; September 28, 2003)
- "Ryuunensei" (柳年生; February 6, 2004)
- "Indigo Blue Story" (March 13, 2005)
- "Taiyou ga Itai You" (太陽が痛いよう; June 18, 2005)
- "Vampire de Manpai ya!" (ヴァンパイアデ満杯や！; December 3, 2005)
- "Ketsu Ketsu Ketsu Ketsu Ketsu Ketsu Ketsu Ketsu Ketsu ~Kyuuketsu~" (尻尻尻尻尻尻尻尻尻～きゅうけつ～; December 8, 2005)

Videos

- Gogo wa xx Aikaryu Video (午後はxx藍華柳ビデオ; October 24, 2004)
- Happy End (July 15, 2007)
- Kaisan Dewa Naku Sotsugyou the DVD (解散ではなく卒業 THE DVD; October 3, 2007)

Omnibuses

- Punishment Party Vol.3 (March 2002, with "Moumokuna Kikeiji no Kaisenkyoku")
- Punishment Party Vol.4 (July 25, 2002, with "Mind... F")
- New Scream Date 2002 (September 29, 2002, with "Ru Zeru to Shizuki")
- "Water & Oil" (May 22, 2004, split single with Mizeria, with "Nabanax" and "Raamen")
- Crow That Wore Crown (October 29, 2008, with "Kyuuketsu ~Uruwashiki Nanji no Chi~")
