= Ascendead Master =

Single by Versailles

from the album Jubilee
- Released: June 24, 2009
- Genre: Power metal, symphonic metal, neoclassical metal
- Length: 12:23 Regular Edition; 7:47 Limited Edition I 7:37 Limited Edition II; 7:22 Limited Edition III
- Label: Warner Music Japan
- Songwriters: lyrics : Kamijo; music : Hizaki

Versailles Singles singles chronology
"Prince & Princess" (2008)	"Ascendead Master" (2009)	"Destiny -The Lovers-" (2010)

"Ascendead Master" is the fourth single by the Japanese band Versailles, and their first for a major record label. Released on June 24, 2009, it was the band's last single to feature original bassist Jasmine You. Both "Ascendead Master" and "Gekkakou" were remastered for their first major album Jubilee.

To accompany the single, Versailles released a fifteen-minute short film, which is broken up into three acts. Each edition contains a different instrumental track used in the film and each limited edition DVD contains one act of the film, as well as the promotional video for the title track.

== Track listing ==
Regular Edition
No.	Title	Lyrics	Music	Length
1.	"Ascendead Master"	Kamijo	Hizaki	5:52
2.	"Gekkakou" (月下香)	Hizaki	Hizaki	4:43
3.	"Descendant of The Rose" (Soundtrack)		Kamijo	1:48
Total length:				12:23

Limited Edition I
No.	Title	Lyrics	Music	Length
1.	"Ascendead Master"	Kamijo	Hizaki	5:52
2.	"Hallway" (Soundtrack)		Kamijo	1:55
Total length:				6:47

Limited Edition II
No.	Title	Lyrics	Music	Length
1.	"Ascendead Master"	Kamijo	Hizaki	5:52
2.	"Pilgrim" (Soundtrack)		Kamijo	1:45
Total length:				6:37

Limited Edition III
No.	Title	Lyrics	Music	Length
1.	"Ascendead Master"	Kamijo	Hizaki	5:52
2.	"Covenant" (Soundtrack)		Kamijo	1:30
Total length:				6:22
