= Prince (song) =

Song by Versailles
- Released: September 13, 2008
- Genre: Symphonic metal, power metal
- Length: 4:56
- Label: Sherow Artist Society
- Songwriter(s): Kamijo & Hizaki

"Prince" is a song by Versailles released on September 13, 2008, as a free download on their website as "a gift to their fans for supporting them for so long". On the same day, this song was featured on the sampler The Art of Propaganda, alongside Chariots' song "Shred". It was also added as a bonus track to the October 22 reissue of their first album Noble. The song is also featured on their next single, "Prince & Princess", albeit with a new introduction.

== Track listing ==
No.	Title	Lyrics	Music	Length
1.	"Prince"	Kamijo	Kamijo & Hizaki	4:56
