= Jupiter (band) =

Japanese visual kei symphonic metal band

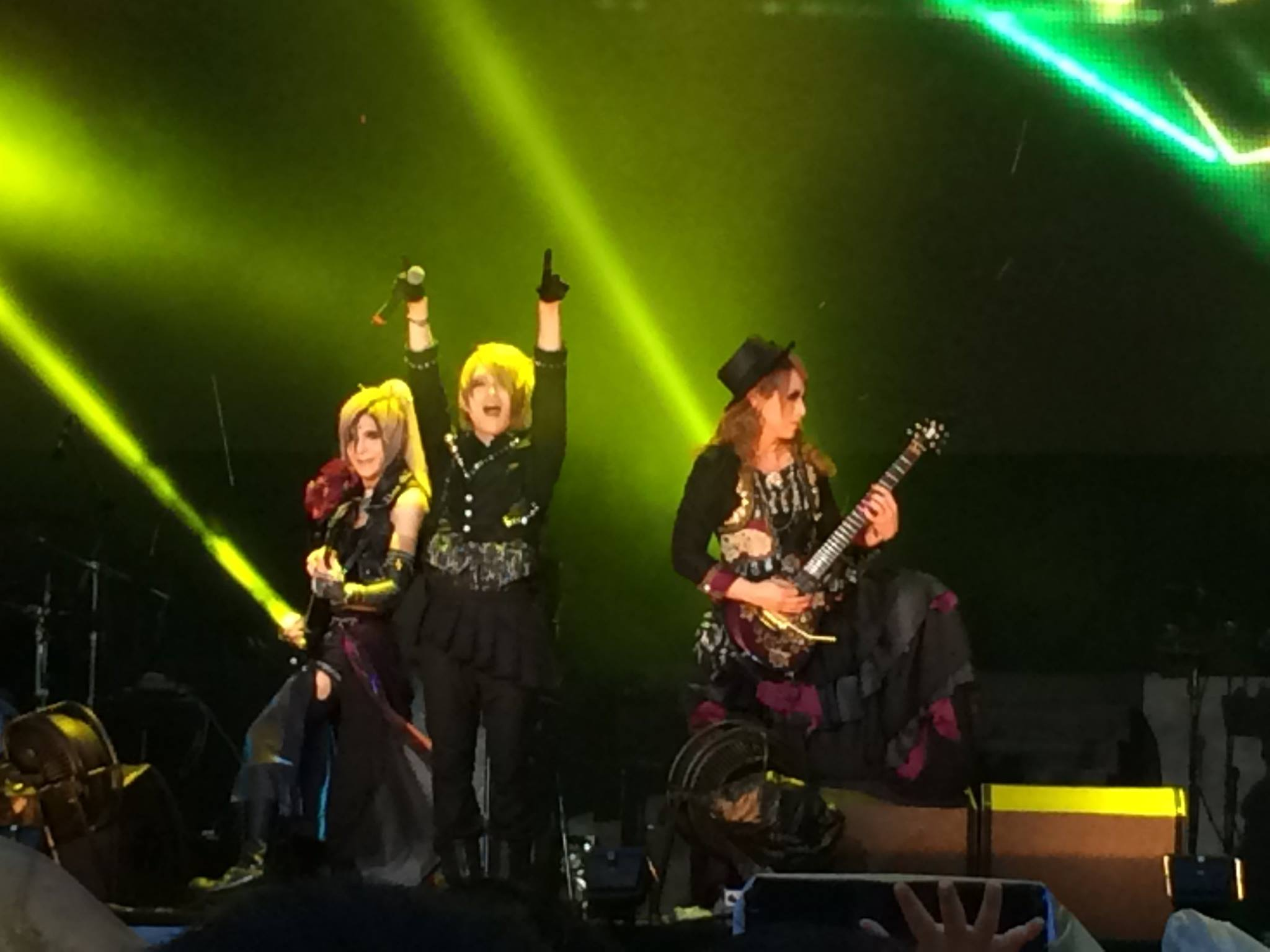
- Jupiter performing in 2015. From left to right: Teru, Zin, Hizaki

Background information
- Origin: Tokyo, Japan
- Genres: Symphonic metal; power metal
- Years active: 2013–present
- Labels: Universal Music; Zeno
- Members: Hizaki; Teru; Kuze; Cero; Majyu
- Past members: Yuki; Masashi; Zin; Rucy; Daisuke
- Website: jupiter.bitfan.id

Jupiter is a Japanese visual kei symphonic power metal band, formed in 2013 by four of the five members of Versailles. After several personnel changes, guitarists Hizaki and Teru remain the only original members, with vocalist Kuze, bassist Cero and drummer Majyu completing the current lineup.

== History ==
Less than a year after Versailles ended activities, guitarists Hizaki and Teru, drummer Yuki and bass guitarist Masashi, announced they had formed a new band named Jupiter on April 1, 2013. Having recruited vocalist Zin, they also revealed plans for their first single in the summer. According to Hizaki, the name is based on astrology and can mean protection, good luck or beautiful spirit. They performed at the "Stylish Wave Generation Vol.4" event at Akasaka Blitz on May 26, alongside Penicillin, Diaura and other visual kei bands.

The single, "Blessing of the Future", was released on July 24 and reached number 38 on the Oricon music chart. Before the single was even released, their first album, Classical Element, was announced for August 28, 2013. It peaked at number 31 on the chart. The band had its first concert at Akasaka Blitz on September 26, before embarking on its first tour in October. In December, they took part in three of the "Stylish Wave Circuit '13 Winter Shogun" concerts.

Jupiter had their first overseas performances in February 2014, in Warsaw, Poland (5th), Cologne, Germany (7th), and Paris, France (8th). Their second single, "Last Moment", was released on March 12, 2014, and reached number 37. The History of Genesis, the band's second album, was released on January 7, 2015, and reached number 32. The eight date Temple of Venus tour followed in April. On November 19, 2015, one month before Versailles officially resumed activities, it was announced that Yuki and Masashi would be leaving Jupiter. They performed their last concert with Jupiter on April 29, 2016, at Shinjuku ReNY. The single, "The Spirit within Me", was released on December 29, 2016, as a trio.

In March 2017, Jupiter announced the mini album Tears of the Sun for release on May 10. Their support drummer Daisuke (ex-Roach) and new bass guitarist Rucy (ex-Killaneth) were named as full members in April. The two made their first live appearance on the first day of the Under the Burning Sun tour on May 12. However, in September, Jupiter announced that Zin would be leaving the band after the final date of their Ascension to Heaven tour. It took place at Meguro Rockmaykan on February 3, 2018.

In July 2018, Jupiter announced their new vocalist Kuze (ex-Concerto Moon) and the August 8 single "Theory of Evolution", which was supported by a two-legged tour of the same name that took place in September and November. In November 2018, the band revealed that their third studio album Zeus ~Legends Never Die~ would be released on March 13, 2019 and supported by a ten-date European tour across six countries in May. However, in January 2019 Rucy announced that he would be leaving Jupiter after their January 19 show due to differences that arose while recording the album. As a result, Zeus ~Legends Never Die~ was postponed until April 3.

Cero officially joined Jupiter as bassist on December 1, 2024. After two and a half years of inactivity, they held a concert titled Reunion on January 10, 2025. The single "Ecliptic" was made available on Zeno Records' online store on April 30, before its general release on June 4. In October, it was announced that drummer Daisuke would be leaving the band after their final concert of 2025, Oracle of Rebirth at Yokohama ReNY on December 23. He made the decision to retire as a professional musician after dealing with health issues that affected his drumming for the past year. Jupiter released The Pantheon ~Age of Heroes~, their first album in seven years, on August 26, 2026. Its song "Endless Sky" features Jill of Unlucky Morpheus on violin. The band are scheduled to perform a three-date European tour of Germany, Switzerland and France in March 2027.

== Band members ==
Current
Hizaki – guitar (2013–present)
Teru – guitar (2013–present)
Kuze – vocals (2018–present)
Cero – bass (2024–present)
Majyu – drums (2026–present)

Former
Yuki – drums (2013–2016)
Masashi – bass (2013–2016)
Zin – vocals (2013–2018)
Rucy – bass (2017–2019)
Daisuke – drums (2017–2025); as a support musician (2016–2017)

Support
Shoyo – bass (2016–2017, 2019–2022)

== Discography ==
Studio albums

- Classical Element (August 28, 2013) Oricon Albums Chart Peak Position: No. 31
- The History of Genesis (January 7, 2015) No. 32
- Tears of the Sun (May 10, 2017, mini album) No. 77
- Zeus ~Legends Never Die~ (April 3, 2019) No. 80
- The Pantheon ~Age of Heroes~ (August 26, 2026)

Singles

- "Blessing of the Future" (July 24, 2013) Oricon Singles Chart Peak Position: No. 38
- "Last Moment" (March 12, 2014) No. 37
- "Topaz" (August 26, 2015) No. 59
- "The Spirit within Me" (December 29, 2016)
- "Theory of Evolution" (August 8, 2018) No. 125
- "Warrior of Liberation" (April 8, 2020) No. 82
- "Breath of Heaven" (June 8, 2022) No. 143
- "Ecliptic" (June 4, 2025)

Limited singles

- "Arcadia" (September 13, 2014)
- "Kōri no Naka no Shōjo" (氷の中の少女; October 26, 2014)

Home videos

- Prevenient Grace (December 27, 2015)
- Ange Gardien (March 14, 2016)
- Blessing of the Future (July 27, 2016) Oricon DVDs Chart Peak Position: No. 90
- Wind of Evolution (October 10, 2018)
- 「Zeus Tour」 Live DVD (August 1, 2019)
- The Forces (December 22, 2021) No. 176
