= Holy Grail (album) =

Studio album by Versailles
- Released: June 15, 2011
- Recorded: Warner Music Recording Studio & Studio Fine
- Genre: Symphonic power metal, neoclassical metal
- Length: 71:20
- Label: Warner Music Japan
- Producer: Versailles & Takahashi Keiichi

Versailles chronology
Jubilee (2010)	Holy Grail (2011)	Versailles (2012)

Holy Grail is the third album by Versailles, released on June 15, 2011. It is their first to feature new bassist Masashi. The album includes "Philia", theme song of their TV program Onegai Kanaete Versailles, "Masquerade", main theme of the film Vampire Stories: Brothers and "Vampire", main theme of the film Vampire Stories: Chasers.

The limited edition comes with a bonus DVD of the music videos for "Masquerade", "Vampire", "Destiny -The Lovers-" and "Philia". The deluxe box limited edition comes with a DVD of five versions of the "Masquerade" music video, each focusing on a different member, an interview with Kamijo and the making-of the video.

== Track listing ==
Disc 1 (CD)
No.	Title	Lyrics	Music	Length
1.	"Masquerade"	Kamijo	Kamijo	6:00
2.	"Philia"	Kamijo	Hizaki	5:56
3.	"Thanatos"	Kamijo	Masashi	4:32
4.	"Flowery"	Kamijo	Teru	3:59
5.	"Remember Forever"	Hizaki	Hizaki	6:35
6.	"Destiny -The Lovers-"	Kamijo	Kamijo	6:40
7.	"Dry Ice Scream!! (Remove Silence)"	Hizaki	Hizaki	4:38
8.	"Threshold"		Teru	1:59
9.	"Judicial Noir"	Kamijo	Hizaki	4:23
10.	"Love Will Be Born Again"	Kamijo	Kamijo	4:13
11.	"Vampire"	Kamijo	Kamijo	4:31
12.	"Faith & Decision"	Kamijo	Hizaki	16:28
13.	"The Theme of Holy Grail"		Kamijo	1:26
Total length:				71:20

Disc 2 (DVD, limited edition)
No.	Title	Lyrics	Music	Length
1.	"Masquerade" (Music video)	Kamijo	Kamijo
2.	"Vampire" (Music video)	Kamijo	Kamijo
3.	"Destiny -The Lovers-" (Music video)	Kamijo	Kamijo
4.	"Philia" (Music video)	Kamijo	Hizaki

Disc 2 (DVD, deluxe box limited edition)
No.	Title	Lyrics	Music	Length
1.	"Masquerade (Kamijo version)" (Music video)	Kamijo	Kamijo
2.	"Masquerade (Hizaki version)" (Music video)	Kamijo	Kamijo
3.	"Masquerade (Teru version)" (Music video)	Kamijo	Kamijo
4.	"Masquerade (Masashi version)" (Music video)	Kamijo	Kamijo
5.	"Masquerade (Yuki version)" (Music video)	Kamijo	Kamijo
6.	"Kamijo interview and clips from the making of the music video"
