= Lareine =

Japanese visual kei rock band

LAREINE

Background information
- Also known as: Laliene
- Origin: Tokyo, Japan
- Genres: Baroque pop; progressive rock; synthpop; art rock
- Years active: 1994–2007, 2015
- Labels: Sony, Applause
- Past members: Kamijo; Emiru; Mayu; Kazumi; Machi; Akira; Hirono; Kyouka; Sakureu

Lareine (French for "The Queen"; stylized as LAREINE) was a Japanese visual kei rock band formed in 1994. The band's name was derived from vocalist and sole-constant member Kamijo's interest in French history, specifically Queen Marie Antoinette. In 1999 the group signed to Sony, later in 2000 when all other members left, Kamijo created Applause Records. After a number of line-up changes and the release of several albums, EPs and singles, the group disbanded in 2007.

== History ==
=== Laliene (1994–1996) ===
Lareine was initially formed in November 1994 under the name Laliene (stylized as LALIENE), by vocalist Kamijo (then known as Shoki) and guitarist Mayu (then known as Kaito), who met while roadies for Malice Mizer. They were joined by Sakureu and Hirono on guitar and Kyouka on drums, later Emiru was recruited on bass. But before their first performance in March 1995 Mayu left, Sakureu left a short while later and Mayu returned to replace him. In October however Kyouka and Hirono both left. They recruited Machi, also a former Malice Mizer roadie, on drums. On March 26, 1996 they held their first anniversary live and changed their name to Lareine.

=== Lareine (1996–2000) ===
In August 1996 Akira joined as second guitarist. In December they released their first EP, Blue Romance. In August 1997 Akira left the group. In January 1999 Lareine signed with Sony Music Entertainment Japan and in February 2000 released their second album, Fierte no Umi to Tomo ni Kiyu ~The Last of Romance~. However soon after Emiru announced that he was leaving the group, and Mayu and Machi decided to leave as well. So in August 2000 Lareine held their last concert for fan club members only.

=== Kamijo's Lareine (2000–2002) ===
Although all other member's left, Kamijo decided to continue Lareine alone and created his own record label, Applause Records. This "solo project" continued until 2001 when he ceased Lareine activity and formed New Sodmy with Mayu. But New Sodmy only lasted a year up to 2002 and so Lareine resumed activity.

=== Reunited (2003–2006, 2015) ===
On March 26, 2003 Emiru announced he was rejoining Lareine, as was new drummer Kazumi. On May 17, at a concert, Mayu also rejoined the group. On September 5, 2004 the album Never Cage was released.

On March 1, 2006 Kazumi left the band and quit the music business. They recruited their roadie, Kazami, as support drummer and continued to perform. But Mayu started to blow off gigs and lose touch with the rest of the group, so Lareine disbanded. Their last official performance was on October 31, 2006, with Hizaki filling in on guitar. Vocalist Kamijo went on to form Versailles with Hizaki. Emiru changed his name to Run and was bassist for Anubis.

At his December 28, 2015 concert at Zepp DiverCity celebrating his 20th anniversary in music, Kamijo performed with Emiru, Mayu and Machi in a reunion of the classic Lareine lineup.

== Members ==
=== Former members ===
- Kamijo/Shoki – vocals 1994–2007, 2015 (New Sodmy, Versailles)
- Emiru – bass 1995–2000, 2003–2007, 2015 (Ribbon, Anubis)
- Mayu/Kaito – guitar 1994–1995, 1995–2000, 2003–2006, 2015 (New Sodmy)
- Kazumi – drums 2003–2006 (Ribbon)
- Machi – drums 1995–2000, 2015 (Chanton L'amour)
- Akira – guitar 1996–1997 (D+L)
- Hirono – guitar 1994–1995
- Kyouka – drums 1994–1995 (Eliphas Levi, Cupid)
- Sakureu – guitar 1994–1995

=== Support member ===
- Kazami – drums 2006–2007 (Daizystripper)

== Discography ==
=== Albums ===
- Blue Romance: Yasashii Hanatachi no Kyousou (Blue Romance～優しい花達の狂奏～, September 7, 1997)
- Fierte no Umi to Tomo ni Kiyu: The Last of Romance (フィエルテの海と共に消ゆ～THE LAST OF ROMANCE～, February 16, 2000) Oricon Style Weekly Albums Chart Top Position: 20
- Scream (November 1, 2000)
- Vampire Scream (November 1, 2000)
- Reine de Fleur I (March 26, 2003)
- Reine de Fleur II (March 26, 2003)
- Crystal Letos (March 31, 2004)
- Never Cage (September 5, 2004)

=== EPs ===
- Blue Romance (December 24, 1996)
- Lillie Charlotte (October 1, 1998) Oricon Style Weekly Albums Chart Top Position: 70
- Etude (December 25, 2002)
- Majesty (September 30, 2003)
- Knight (November 28, 2003)
- Etude: Platinum White (December 25, 2003)
- Princess (March 24, 2004)
- Winter Romantic (March 18, 2006)

=== Singles ===
- "Saikai no Hana" (再会の花, March 26, 1996)
- "Romancia" (April 26, 1997)
- "Fleur" (March 14, 1998)
- "Metamorphose" (December 18, 1998) Oricon Style Weekly Singles Chart Top Position: 50
- "Fiancailles" (May 26, 1999) Oricon Style Weekly Singles Chart Top Position: 21
- "Billet (Osanaki Natsu no Binsen)" (Billet ～幼き夏の便箋～, August 25, 1999) Oricon Style Weekly Singles Chart Top Position: 30
- "Fuyu Tokyo" (冬東京, December 15, 1999) Oricon Style Weekly Singles Chart Top Position: 29
- "Bara wa Utsukushiku Chiru/Ano Hito no Aishita Hito Nara" (薔薇は美しく散る/あの人の愛した人なら, February 9, 2000) Oricon Style Weekly Singles Chart Top Position: 40
- "Grand Pain" (October 12, 2000) Oricon Style Weekly Singles Chart Top Position: 64
- "Chou no Hana/Lesson" (蝶の花/レッスン, November 27, 2002)
- "Saikai no Hana" (re-release, March 26, 2003)
- "Scarlet Majesty" (July 30, 2003)
- "With Present Letos" (November 14, 2003)
- "Trailer" (July 19, 2004)
- "Doukeshi no Bukyoku" (道化師の舞曲, November 27, 2005)
- "Setsurenka" (雪恋詩, November 27, 2005)
- "Cinderella Fantasy" (November 27, 2005)
- "Sakura" (さくら, March 18, 2006)
- "Drama" (March 18, 2006)
- "Last Song" (May 9, 2007)

=== Demo tapes ===
- "Laliene" (March 29, 1995)
- "2ND DEMO" (July 27, 1995, tour distributed)
- "Tsukiyo no Kageki" (月夜の歌劇, July 20, 1996, live distribution)
- "Mist" (April 28, 1997)

=== Videos ===
- Chantons L'amour: Lillie Kara no Tegami (Chantons l'amour～リリーからの手紙～, August 25, 1999)
- Fierte no Umi to Tomo ni Kiyu: Film Tracks (フィエルテの海と共に消ゆ～FILM TRACKS～, February 16, 2000)
- Scarlet Majesty (April 1, 2004)
- KAMIJO in Vienna (July 19, 2005)
- Live Document Film In Tokyo Kinema Club (August 31, 2005)
- The Last Of Romance I (August, 2006)
- Legend Of Fantasy (December, 2006)
