= Dolly (Japanese band) =

Japanese visual kei rock band

- Origin: Tokyo, Japan
- Genre: Rock
- Years active: 2005–2012
- Label: Marder Suitcase
- Members: Mitsu; Masa; Hachi; Tsuguki
- Website: dolly-web.com

Dolly was a Japanese visual kei rock band formed in 2005. They were signed to the Marder Suitcase label.

== History ==
Dolly was formed in 2005 with an original lineup of Mitsu, Masa, Yuina, Hachi and Takashi Oshoudani as a support member. They had their first live performance in October 2005. at Takadanobaba Area and released their first single, "Screen of Indoors" shortly after as a DVD single.

In 2006, their first CD single, "Pumpkin Carriage Parade", was released on January 13. In March, they released another single, "2 Ripped Sweets", followed shortly by Takashi's departure. Tsuguki quickly replaced Takashi and Dolly released their first EP, "Cynical Closet" (シニカル クロゼット), on July 26. In November 2006. they began a three-single release campaign with Ussetsu Drop (鬱雪ドロップ), and continued in February 2007. with Shinshoku Rosetta (浸食ロゼッタ) and Suisai Palette (水彩パレット), all three singles bearing the "Tricolor Opera" (トリコロールオペラ) title.

Dolly's next single of 2007, "Kalmezon" (カルメゾン), appeared in stores in June. In September, they released their first full album Jewel's dRIP containing previously released singles, as well as eight new tracks. After a short break, due to Mitsu's health problems and brief hospital stay, Dolly continued their "Jewel's dRIP Parade" tour.

In 2008, Dolly released singles "Closet Letter" (クロゼットレター), and "JULIET" as well the Mini Album "HeavenwOrd" as part of their "5 Coaster Cabaret" Concept; the live distributed single "Hana Uta" (花唄) and the free distributed single "Shikisai Gradation" (四季彩グラデーション). In December they signed a contract to a major label, and released the album "Primary, Premium Best" which contains "Strawberry on the Scalp", "Pumpkin Carriage Parade" and other singles and b-sides, and a new song as a bonus track "Usagi Uta" (兎唄).

In February 2009, Dolly started the year with a single "Toki no Ressha" (時の列車) and a DVD "Sai-collect picture" (再コレクトピクチャー).

In May 2009. the first announcements of guitarist Yuina's illness appeared, through the canceling schedule after their Fan club only lives. Being on hiatus until October, Dolly eventually put up an announcement of their homepage, where they state that Yuina will be forced to leave the band after their lives at LIQUIDROOM Ebisu in November 2009. because of illness.

However, Dolly continued as a 4 members act and in March 2010. they released their next song and music video "Play", on the same day they had their first overseas performance on SXSW convention in Austin, Texas. After returning to Japan, in July they released their next song "GOTHIC PARTY". Both songs were included on their full-length album "CAPSULE" which included 7 new songs, "Play", "Gothic party", re-recording of their song "Hoshi no Sunadokei" (星の砂時計) that first appeared on "Cynical Closet", and two SE tracks.

In March 2011. Dolly released their next single named "Moonlight disco" (ムーンライトディスコ) and a best-of compilation "「PRIVATE SHELL-Complete The Best 2005-2011-」" in November. They continued at a steady pace despite drummer Tsuguki's short absence due to illness, and released their next single "Koushoku no Canary" (虹色のカナリア) in April 2012. Sadly, three days after the release of the single, on April 27, 2012. Dolly announced on their homepage that they will be going on indefinite hiatus at the end of the year. However, they have released a full album before the hiatus on October 9, named "Träumerei" (トロイメライ). At the end of October they started their one-man tour "Träumerei to Kaisou Mokuba" (トロイメライと廻想の木馬) with the tour final and their last live before the hiatus being held in Shibuya O-EAST on 21 December 2012. The last live was filmed and later released as a DVD titled "Yume no saihate" (夢の最果て). The DVD was only released in June 2013. instead of planned April 17 due to manufacturing problems.

After the hiatus, Dolly members have continued their careers separately. Vocalist Mitsu joined with ex guitarist Yuina for a project named DOPPEL which has released an EP "Egg knock" (エッグノック) in June; guitarist Masa released a solo album named "Life" on 30 October 2013; drummer Tsuguki became a producer for Marder Suitcase band Yazzmad and a support drummer for Masa; and bassist Hachi continued as a support bassist for various bands.

== Line-up ==
- Mitsu (蜜) – vocals
- Masa (聖) – guitar
- Hachi (はち) – bass
- Tsuguki (亜樹) – drums

Former members

- Takashi Oshoudani (大正谷 隆) – support drums
- Yuina (ゆいな) – guitar

== Discography ==
Albums & EPs

- Cynical Closet (26 July 2006)

1. Diorama Never Land (ジオラマ ネバーランド)
2. SCRAP BULLET[7DAYS]
3. Nejimaki shiki Taruto (ネジマキ式タルト)
4. Hoshi no sunadokei (星の砂時計)
5. Yuuyami ni oboreta shiroi balloon (夕闇に溺れた白いバルーン)

- Jewel's dRIP (5 September 2007)

1. bitters marmalade RIP
2. Cassis Milk
3. Sakura shiki ame kan (サクラ式飴缶)
4. Suisai Palette (水彩パレット)
5. Clockwork march
6. Ame furi no Theater (雨降りの映画館)
8. Tremologic (トレモロジック)
9. Alice in Dizzypit
10. Chameleon (カメレオン)
11. Tengai no jinkou teien (天蓋の人工庭園)
12. Ussetsu Drop (鬱雪ドロップ)

- HeavenwOrd (7 September 2008)

1. Heaven’s door
2. Shiny Merry (シャイニーメリー)
3. mirror, mirage
4. 「R」
5. Word’s end

- Primary, Premium Best (10 December 2008)

1. Strawberry On the Scalp
2. Pumpkin carriage parade
3. INject candy
4. Ussetsu Drop (鬱雪ドロップ)
5. Kuroneko Catherine (黒猫カトリーヌ)
6. Shinshoku Rosetta (浸食ロゼッタ)
7. "Kingyo" (「金魚」)
8. Suisai Palette (水彩パレット)
9. Sakurarium (サクラリウム)
10. Miffy Number (兎唄)

Singles

- "Pumpkin Carriage Parade" (13 January 2006)

1. Pumpkin Carriage Parade

- "2 Ripped Sweets" (8 March 2006)

1. INject candy
2. Reddish chocolate
3. Sugar (シュガー)

- "Tricolor Opera - Ussetsu Drop" (1 November 2006)

1. Ussetsu Drop (鬱雪ドロップ)
2. Kuroneko Catherine (黒猫カトリーヌ)
3. Psycho Flipper (サイコフリッパー)

- "Tricolor Opera - Shinshoku Rosetta" (21 February 2007)

1. Shinshoku Rosetta (浸食ロゼッタ)
2. Ringo-shou (林檎症)
3. "Kingyo" (「金魚」)

- "Tricolor Opera - Suisai Palette" (21 February 2007)

1. Suisai Palette (水彩パレット)
2. Rasenjou Metro (螺旋状メトロ)
3. Sakurarium (サクラリウム)

- "Quadlor Opera - Hoshikuzu clock" (21 February 2007)

1. Miffy Number (兎唄)

- "Karumeson" (6 June 2007)

1. Ame furi no eigakan (雨降りの映画館)
2. Misshitsu Orgel (密室オルゴール)
3. revolver’s-go-round

- "Closet Letter" (6 February 2008)

1. Closet Letter (クロゼットレター)
2. Orange (オレンジ)
3. Haru uraraka na, 503-bou (春うららかな、503房)

- "Hana Uta" (March 2008)

1. Hana Uta (花唄)

- "Juliet" (25 June 2008)

1. JULIET
2. Senjou no Ballerina (線上のバレリーナ)
3. $ Game ($ゲーム)

- "Shikisai Gradation" (7 September 2008)

1. Shikisai Gradation (四季彩グラデーション)

- "Toki no Ressha" (18 February 2009)

1. Toki no ressha (時の列車)
2. Tentai touhikou (天体逃飛行)
3. Gekkou ha Limelight (月光はライムライト)

- "Play" (19 March 2010, [only on iTunes Store])

1. Play

DVDs

- Screen of Indoors (26 October 2005, [DVD single])

1. Strawberry On the Scalp

- Re:collect Picture (4 February 2009, [PV collection])

1. Ussetsu Drop (鬱雪ドロップ)
2. Shinshoku Rosetta (浸食ロゼッタ)
3. Suisai Palette (水彩パレット)
4. Ame furi no eigakan (雨降りの映画館)
5. JULIET
6. Closet Letter (クロゼットレター)
7. Word's end

- Heaven Ward ([Live DVD, Limited to Official Fan Club "Bonnie"])

1. Orange
2. Suisai Palette (水彩パレット)
3. Alice in Dizzypit
4. Word's end["Heaven wArd" Image edit ver.]
and one Bonus track.
