= Lyrical Sympathy =

EP by Versailles
- Released: October 31, 2007
- Genre: Symphonic power metal, neoclassical metal
- Length: 33:11
- Language: Japanese
- Label: Sherow Artist Society, CLJ

Versailles albums chronology
Lyrical Sympathy (2007)	Noble (2008)

Lyrical Sympathy is the debut EP by Versailles, released on October 31, 2007. It was released simultaneously in Japan and Europe, which is unusual for a newly formed band.

Two of their songs, "The Red Carpet Day" and "Sympathia", were rerecorded in their fifth-anniversary single "Rose" and their self-titled album Versailles, respectively.

== Track listing ==
No.	Title	Lyrics	Music	Length
1.	"Intro"		Kamijo	1:10
2.	"The Love from a Dead Orchestra"	Kamijo	Kamijo	8:29
3.	"Shout & Bites"	Kamijo	Kamijo	3:59
4.	"Beast of Desire"	Kamijo	Hizaki	4:26
5.	"Forbidden Gate"	Kamijo	Hizaki	4:39
6.	"The Red Carpet Day"	Kamijo	Teru	4:24
7.	"Sympathia"	Kamijo	Hizaki	6:08
Total length:				33:15
