= Noble (album) =

Studio album by Versailles
- Released: July 9, 2008
- Genre: Symphonic power metal, neoclassical metal
- Length: 66:01 (Japanese version); 63:02 (American, European versions); 58:13 (Japanese re-issue)
- Label: Sherow Artist Society (JP); CLJ Records (EU); Maru Music (NA)

Versailles albums chronology
Lyrical Sympathy (2007)	Noble (2008)	Jubilee (2010)

Singles from Noble
- 1. "The Revenant Choir" Released: June 23, 2007; 2. "A Noble Was Born In Chaos" Released: March 19, 2008

Noble (full title Noble -Vampires' Chronicle-) is the debut album by Japanese power metal band Versailles. It was first released digitally on July 9, 2008, exclusively on international iTunes Stores, and then in a standard CD release on July 16.

This album was released in four different editions. The first edition is the standard Japanese edition which came with 12 tracks and an additional DVD containing three music videos. The European edition released on the same day featured the single version of "The Revenant Choir" as a bonus track. The American edition was released on October 21, 2009, and featured the song "Prince" as its bonus track. The Japanese re-issue also contained "Prince" as a bonus track, but it did not include the DVD. It reached number 42 on the Oricon Charts and stayed on the charts for 4 weeks.

== Track listing ==
Disc one (CD)
No.	Title	Lyrics	Music	Length
1.	"Prelude"	Kamijo	Kamijo	1:33
2.	"Aristocrat's Symphony"	Kamijo	Kamijo	6:15
3.	"Antique in the Future"	Kamijo	Kamijo	5:46
4.	"Second Fear -Another Descendant-"	Kamijo	Teru	3:08
5.	"Zombie"	Kamijo	Teru	3:52
6.	"After Cloudia"	Kamijo	Hizaki	4:53
7.	"Windress"	Kamijo	Hizaki	4:28
8.	"The Revenant Choir" (Album Version)	Kamijo	Versailles	7:01
9.	"To the Chaos Inside"	Kamijo	Teru	3:14
10.	"Suzerain"	Kamijo	Hizaki	4:20
11.	"History of the Other Side"	Kamijo	Hizaki	9:38
12.	"Episode"	Kamijo	Kamijo	3:10
13.	"The Revenant Choir" (Single Version) (European Edition Only)	Kamijo	Versailles	8:43
14.	"Prince" (American Edition & Japanese Re-issue Only)	Kamijo	Hizaki	4:50
Total length:				70:51

Disc Two (DVD, Japanese & American Edition)
No.	Title	Length
1.	"Prelude" (Music video)
2.	"Aristocrat's Symphony" (Music video)
3.	"Episode" (Music video)

Disc Two (DVD, European Edition)
No.	Title	Length
1.	"Aristocrat's Symphony" (Music video)
