= Versailles (band) =

Japanese visual kei metal band

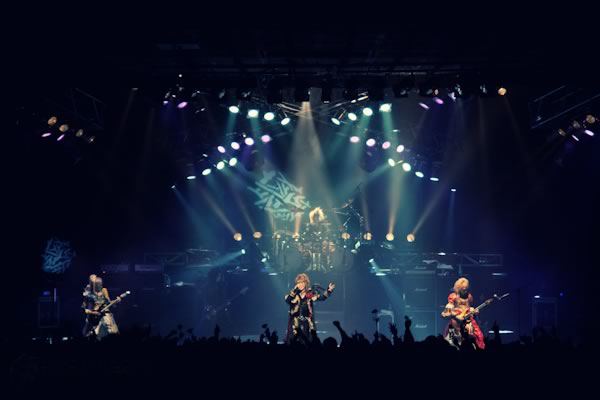
- Versailles performing in Santiago, Chile, in 2010

Background information
- Also known as: Versailles Philharmonic Quintet (in North America)
- Origin: Tokyo, Japan
- Genres: Symphonic metal; power metal
- Works: Versailles discography
- Years active: 2007–2012, 2015–present
- Labels: Sherow Artist Society, Chateau Agency, Warner Music Japan, CLJ (EU), Maru Music (NA)
- Spinoffs: Jupiter
- Spinoff of: Lareine, Hizaki Grace Project, Aikaryu
- Members: Kamijo; Hizaki; Teru; Masashi
- Past members: Jasmine You; Yuki
- Website: www.versailles.jp

Versailles (known as Versailles Philharmonic Quintet in North America) is a Japanese visual kei symphonic power metal band formed in 2007 by vocalist Kamijo and guitarist Hizaki. After recruiting bassist Jasmine You, drummer Yuki and guitarist Teru, they performed their first show on June 23. Their key characteristics are their Rococo-esque costumes, dueling guitars and heavy but melodic arrangements. The group gained a significant worldwide following soon after forming as their debut EP, Lyrical Sympathy (2007), released by Kamijo's own label Sherow Artist Society, received a simultaneous European release and they performed in Europe and the United States the following year. Their first full-length album, Noble, released in 2008, was also released in North America in 2009.

Versailles signed to major label Warner Music Japan in mid-2009; however, on August 9, days after announcing he would be suspending activities for health reasons, Jasmine You died. Their major debut album, Jubilee (2010), was completed with Hizaki performing the unfinished bass tracks. They went on a world tour that took them to Latin America and Europe and ended with new bassist Masashi officially joining. 2011 began with the whole band starring in their own television show, Onegai Kanaete Versailles (おねがいかなえてヴェルサイユ; lit. "Fulfill My Wish Versailles"), which ran from January to March. Their third album, Holy Grail (2011), has been their highest charting, reaching number 12 on the Oricon Albums Chart, and was supported by their second world tour. In July 2012, Versailles announced they would be stopping all activities at the end of the year. They released the self-titled album, Versailles, in September 2012, and after a short tour, performed their last concert at NHK Hall in December of that year. The band resumed activities at a concert in December 2015 at Zepp DiverCity.

== History ==
=== 2007: Formation ===
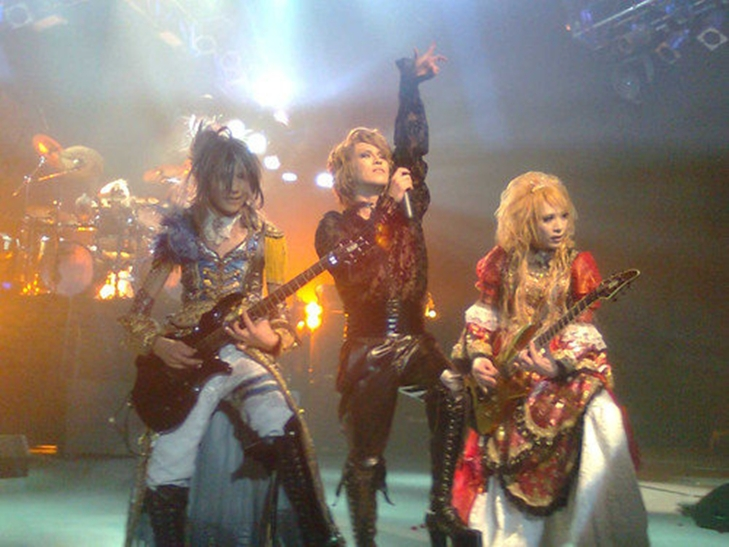
Teru, Kamijo and Hizaki (2010)

After moving to Tokyo, Hizaki received a phone call from Kamijo, who wanted to form a band with twin guitars and asked him to join, but as he was already playing in a group, the guitarist turned the singer down. Time passed, and after Hizaki played support guitar for Kamijo's band Lareine at their last concert in October 2006, Kamijo again asked Hizaki to form a new band. No longer in a band, Hizaki agreed, planning to continue his solo project at the same time. Kamijo and Hizaki created the concept of Versailles and spent a few months gathering members to express it. Their band concept is "the absolute youshikibi (beauty of form) sound and extremes of aestheticism."

On March 30, 2007, the details of the band were announced. Versailles was formed by Kamijo, Hizaki (ex-Sulfuric Acid), and Jasmine You (ex-Jakura). Later, Teru (ex-Aikaryu) and Yuki (ex-Sugar Trip), who were recommended by the Rock May Kan venue in Tokyo, joined the band. Hizaki, Jasmine You and Teru previously played together as part of Hizaki Grace Project. They released promotional material through the Internet, set up an English-language page on MySpace, and had several interviews with foreign press. Versailles made their first appearance with a showcase on June 23, followed by their first performance on June 24 at Ebisu Liquid Room. On these dates they also distributed their first single and DVD single, "The Revenant Choir".

The band signed with the German CLJ Records label and released the EP Lyrical Sympathy on October 31, both in Japan and Europe. Their song "The Love From A Dead Orchestra" also appeared on a compilation album released by Sony BMG in Germany on November 9, called Tokyo Rock City.

=== 2008: Noble ===
In 2008, Versailles made their first appearances in Europe and United States. In March and April, the band performed cooperatively with Matenrou Opera across Europe. On May 3, they performed at the hide memorial summit at Ajinomoto Stadium for 30,000 people, along with many other bands such as X Japan, Luna Sea, Mucc and Marbell. Versailles were later invited by Tainted Reality to perform shows on May 30 at Project A-Kon in Dallas, Texas, and on June 3 at the Knitting Factory in Los Angeles, California as their American debut.

On July 9, 2008, Versailles digitally released their first full album, Noble, exclusively on international iTunes Music Stores. This was followed by its general Japanese CD release and its European release on July 16. It was released in America over a year later on October 21, 2009, by Maru Music, with an added bonus track.

Versailles' Japanese record label announced on August 19, 2008 that they received notice of a musician in the United States already using the name "Versailles". The Japanese band was compelled to create a new promotional name in order to proceed with their plans to tour in the United States again, so they called upon their fans to send in ideas. On September 14, 2008 the band announced on their website that their new name for the US was to be "Versailles -Philharmonic Quintet-", whilst keeping their original name in countries other than United States. "Prince" was the first song released under the new name and was available as a free digital download. They returned to the US for Anime USA on October 11 in Crystal City, Virginia, and for a show at New York City's Knitting Factory on October 13.

=== 2009: Major label debut and death of Jasmine You ===
Kamijo announced at the December 23, 2008 C.C. Lemon Hall one-man live that Versailles would be signing to major record label Warner Music Japan in June 2009, for distribution both in Japan and internationally. Their major label debut single, "Ascendead Master", was released on June 24, 2009.

Versailles played their last nationwide tour as an independent band through March 26 to May 9, entitled The Fragment Collectors. Further events such as the Anthology of Revolution marked their final concerts, finishing with five consecutive nights at Meguro Rock May Kan. Their final independent live took place on June 21, 2009. Versailles announced that they would not be performing any more lives until they release their next album.

On August 3, it was announced that Jasmine You would temporarily suspend all musical activities due to unknown circumstances regarding his health and to recover. It had been announced that Versailles' new album was in the final stages of production and the bass tracks were being recorded. In the early hours of August 9, 2009, it was reported on the official site that Jasmine You had died. The translated announcement reads as follows:

2009.8.9 「Versailles」 Urgent Announcement: Though Jasmine You had taken time off in order to rest because of poor physical condition, we received a report that early in the morning on August 9, he died. Because of the extreme abruptness of this news, the members and staff are all dumbfounded and trying hard to accept this hit. As soon as his family has been notified and updated as to the details and we receive their permission, we will further report to all of the fans. Moreover, with the current announcement, in regards to activity, please allow us to postpone it.

=== 2010: Jubilee ===
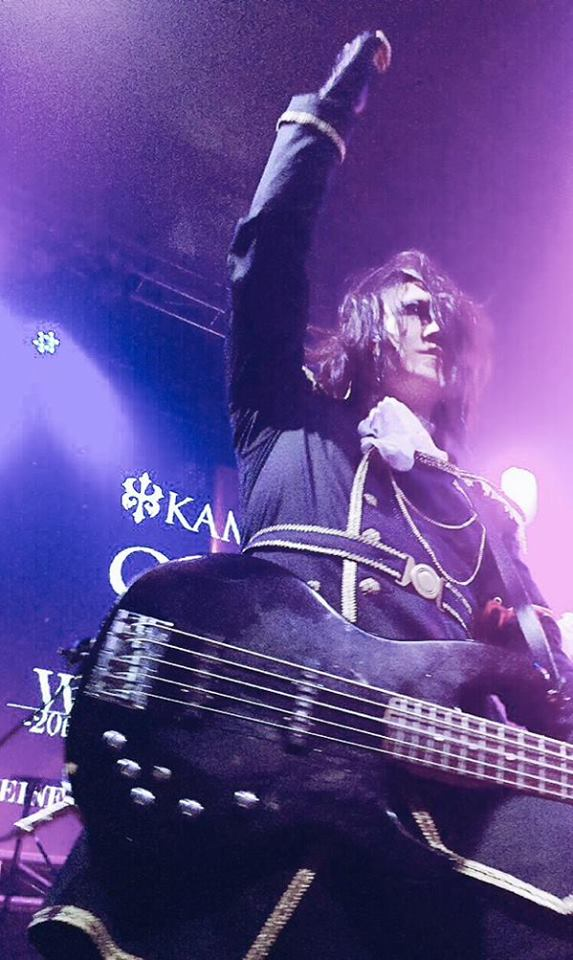
Masashi joined Versailles in 2010, following the death of Jasmine You.

After a canceled performance, Versailles performed at V-Rock Festival '09 on October 25, 2009. Yo of Matenrou Opera played as their support bassist. On January 4, 2010, Versailles held the Jasmine You -Memorial Ceremony- at Shibuya O-East, where themselves, Kaya and Matenrou Opera performed. Their major label debut album entitled, Jubilee, was released on January 20, 2010.

They also announced a world tour entitled Methods of Inheritance, which started on February 28, 2010, in Yokohama. Their support bassist for the tour was Masashi, a member of Cosmo and Közi's live band. The Japanese leg of the tour ended with two final gigs, one in Osaka at Midou Kaikan on April 18 and one in Tokyo at JCB Hall on April 30, 2010, these concerts were performed with a live choir.

Versailles then traveled to Latin America with shows in Brazil, Chile, Argentina, Peru and Mexico, and then to Europe with shows in Norway, Russia, Finland, England, Spain, France, the Netherlands, Germany and Hungary, before returning to Japan. The finale of the tour was performed on September 4, 2010, at C.C. Lemon Hall, some of the concert was later broadcast on WOWOW. There they announced that Masashi officially joined the band as their new bassist, with Jasmine You being cited as an "eternal member". They also announced that live versions of their two indie albums, Lyrical Sympathy -Live- and Noble -Live-, would be released on September 1, 2010. The songs were recorded on December 23, 2008, at their Chateau de Versailles tour final at C.C. Lemon Hall, the same concert that appears on the Chateau de Versailles DVD.

Their next single was released in three types: two different limited editions (type A and B) and a regular edition. The single, entitled "Destiny -The Lovers-", was released on October 27, 2010. In late November, Panasonic broadcast a 15-minute digest of one of Versailles' concerts in 3D at more than 8,000 retail stores nationwide. The concert was the World Tour 2010 "Method of Inheritance" -Jubilee- gig recorded at JCB Hall in Tokyo on April 30, 2010. Some fans caught an early exclusive 3D screening of the concert at the Panasonic Center in Ariake, Japan from November 8 to 14.

=== 2011–2012: Holy Grail, fourth studio album, and the end of activities ===
Cover of the limited edition Onegai Kanaete Versailles DVD box set, that features the band and Rina Koike

In January 2011, Versailles started starring in their own TV mini drama called Onegai Kanaete Versailles (おねがいかなえてヴェルサイユ; lit. "Fulfill My Wish Versailles"). The show also starred Rina Koike and aired on Mainichi Broadcasting System and TV Kanagawa until March. The theme song for the show was Versailles' single "Philia", which was released on March 15. Furthermore, Versailles went on to release their second major studio album, entitled Holy Grail, in three editions on June 15, 2011. The album includes; "Masquerade", main theme of the film Vampire Stories: Brothers, and "Vampire", main theme for the film Vampire Stories: Chasers, which Kamijo produced the music for. The band then started their second world tour, also titled Holy Grail, on July 31, 2011 in Kyoto. The tour took them to Asia (Hong Kong, Taiwan) in September, then to Europe (Russia, England, Spain, Italy in October, Austria, Poland, Germany, France) in October and then to Latin America (Mexico, Colombia, Venezuela, Brazil, Uruguay, Argentina, Chile) in November.

On April 25, the group released the digital single "Rhapsody of the Darkness". They released the single "Rose" on July 4, in celebration of the band's 5th anniversary.

On July 20, Versailles announced on their official website that they were stopping all activities at the end of 2012, stating:

Being our 5th anniversary -- and without a clear direction heading into the future – we have decided it was in the best interest of the band and the music, our staff and supporters, in order to pursue our artistic and personal goals outside the current framework, to stop all our activities by the end of 2012.

The band released their self-titled fourth album on September 26, then went on an eight stop Japanese tour in November, before giving their last performance in Tokyo at NHK Hall on December 20. The compilation album Anthologie was released on January 30, 2013 and includes songs from when the band was signed to Warner Music Group, 2009 to 2012. The limited edition included an additional five-track CD of live recordings. The live DVD Live Best, which compiles concert footage from the same period, was released on March 27, 2013.

In January 2013, Kamijo announced he would start a solo career. His first release, the single "Louis ~Enketsu no La Vie en Rose~", was released on August 28. On April 1, the other Versailles members, Hizaki, Teru, Yuki and Masashi, announced they had formed a new band named Jupiter. They recruited Zin as vocalist and released their debut single, "Blessing of the Future", on July 24. Yuki and Masashi left Jupiter in April 2016.

=== 2015–present: Reunion and Yuki's departure ===
On December 20, 2015, the members of Versailles shared news of a reunion on their official Twitter accounts. It took place at Kamijo's World Tour 2015 -20th Anniversary Best- Grand Finale on December 28 at Zepp DiverCity and was broadcast live worldwide. Versailles held a concert at Zepp DiverCity on June 25, 2016 to celebrate their ninth anniversary. An August 7 concert at Maihama Amphitheater, titled Versailles Kanzen Fukkatsu Live "Chateau de Versailles", marked their complete resumption of activities. The compilation album The Greatest Hits 2007–2016 followed on September 14 and is composed of re-recordings of old songs, plus two new ones.

The Renaissance tour was held from January 26 to February 5, 2017, and marked their return to Europe. The band released a mini-album, titled Lineage ~Bara no Matsuei~, exclusively to people who bought tickets to their February 14, 2017 show at the Nippon Budokan. In September and October, they held their 10th Anniversary World Tour that took them to Latin America, as well as countries including Hong Kong and Canada, before the Japanese leg in November. Lineage ~Bara no Matsuei~ received a worldwide digital release on December 25, 2019. The band was set to release their first single in eight years, "Emperor", on July 15, 2020. However, it was cancelled due to the COVID-19 pandemic.

2022 marked Versailles' 15th anniversary. A tour commemorating the occasion was performed in separate legs, each centered on a specific album. The single Noble concert took place on June 24. The Jubilee leg of the tour was held on October 20 and 22. The Holy Grail leg took place between February 3 and 12, 2023. At the last date, drummer Yuki announced that he would be suspending all musical activities after 2023, devoting his time to treating the chronic dystonia in his right foot, which he first announced publicly in February 2020, and dealing with family issues. Versailles held the Varoque tour from May 13 to June 24, 2023. On June 21, they released their first single in 11 years, "Vogue". On September 10, Yuki announced that rather than taking a hiatus like previously stated, he would instead be retiring from music completely after Versailles' December 14 concert at Zepp Haneda. In the meantime, the band teamed up with Moi dix Mois, D and Matenrou Opera for the four-date Japanese Visual Metal tour between September 22 and October 2, 2023. The four bands collaborated on the song "Kyōsōkyoku ~Tanbinaru Kettō~", which was released as a single credited to the JVM Roses Blood Symphony.

Versailles' first performance following Yuki's departure was a selection of songs at Kamijo's July 18, 2025, solo concert at Line Cube Shibuya, which commemorated his 30th anniversary in music. They were supported by D drummer Hiroki. In 2026, they will perform at the B7 Klan J-Rock Fest in Paris, France on July 11, a solo concert in Santiago, Chile on December 3, and at Knotfest Mexico in Mexico City, Mexico on December 5.

== Members ==
Current members

- Kamijo – vocals (2007–2012, 2015–present)
- Hizaki – guitars (2007–2012, 2015–present)
- Teru – guitars (2007–2012, 2015–present)
- Masashi – bass (2010–2012, 2015–present)

Live support

- Yo – bass for V-Rock Festival '09 on October 25, 2009 (Matenrou Opera)
- Hiroki – drums 2025–2026 (D)
- Maki – drums 2026–present

Former members

- Jasmine You – bass (2007–2009; his death)
  - Although deceased, the band considers Jasmine You an "eternal member".
- Yuki – drums (2007–2012, 2015–2023)

== Discography ==
Studio albums

- Noble (2008)
- Jubilee (2010)
- Holy Grail (2011)
- Versailles (2012)
