= The Revenant Choir =

- "Boys Only" Cover

Single by Versailles

from the album Noble
- Released: June 23, 2007
- Recorded: April 2007 Applause Records Studio & Studio Freiheit
- Genre: Power metal, symphonic metal
- Length: 34:28
- Label: Sherow Artist Society
- Producer(s): Versailles

Versailles Singles singles chronology
"The Revenant Choir" (2007)	"A Noble Was Born in Chaos" (2008)

DVD Cover

"The Revenant Choir" is Versailles first single and was released in three different versions, each with a different cover. It was initially sold at their "boys only" concert on June 23, 2007, at Meguro Rokumeikan. It was sold again at a "female only" live on July 25, at Holiday Shinjuku. A third CD version was issued through Shoxx magazine mail order in September 2007. This version is an enhanced CD that comes with a digital photo gallery.

A DVD under the same title was sold at a concert at the Ebisu Liquid Room on June 24. This only included the music video for the track, no CD.

== Track listing ==
No.	Title	Lyrics	Music	Length
1.	"The Revenant Choir"	Kamijo	Versailles	8:43
2.	"The Revenant Choir-Vocal Lesson-"	Kamijo	Versailles	6:24
3.	"The Revenant Choir-Bass Lesson-"	Kamijo	Versailles	6:24
4.	"The Revenant Choir-Drum Lesson-"	Kamijo	Versailles	6:27
5.	"The Revenant Choir-Guitar Lesson-"	Kamijo	Versailles	6:23
Total length:				34:21

== Personnel ==
- Piano – Kazami (Daizystripper)
- Choir – The Revenant Choir
- English Narration – Leah Riegle
