= Moi dix Mois =

Japanese visual kei gothic metal band

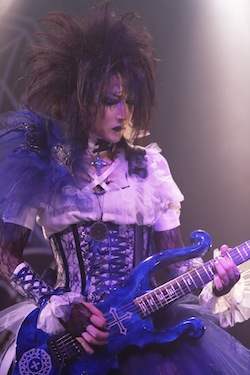
- Mana performing with Moi dix Mois in 2011

Background information
- Origin: Japan
- Genres: Gothic metal; symphonic metal; industrial metal
- Years active: 2002–present
- Labels: Midi:Nette, Gan-Shin (EU), Trisol Music Group (EU)
- Members: Mana; Seth; Sugiya; Hayato; Ryux
- Past members: Juka; Kazuno; Tohru; K
- Website: moidixmois.net

Moi dix Mois (French: "Me Ten Months") is a Japanese visual kei gothic metal band, founded in 2002 by Mana after Malice Mizer paused activities. The guitarist and sole songwriter has been the only constant member in a series of lineup changes, and the band's material is released on his own record label Midi:Nette.

== History ==
=== 2002–2010: Formation and member changes ===
On March 19, 2002, approximately three months after Malice Mizer announced their indefinite hiatus, Mana announced the formation of Moi dix Mois. He has stated that he started the band because he wanted to play black metal. The group was initially a trio of Mana on guitar, Juka on vocals and Kazuno on bass, with Tohru as support drummer. Their first single, "Dialogue Symphonie", was released October 19 of the same year. Tohru officially joined the band with the release of "Shadows Temple" in May 2004. Seven months later, K was introduced as guitarist and "death vocalist" at the Dis Inferno III event in December.

Moi dix Mois played their first concerts outside Japan in March 2005 in Munich, Germany and Paris, France as part of their Invite to Immorality Tour. After the tour's final show on April 24, 2005 in Tokyo, Juka left the band. In 2006, former After Image vocalist Seth was revealed as the new singer, but at the same time, it was announced that Kazuno and Tohru were both leaving the group. A new phase of Moi dix Mois began on March 1, 2006, when they released the album Beyond the Gate as a trio. Before the album was released, Mana indicated that the sound would be the beginning of a renewed direction for the band, possibly more integrated towards electronic music.

In June 2006, Moi dix Mois headlined the Wave-Gotik-Treffen in Leipzig, Germany. They then returned to touring in Japan. A prospective five city tour in the United States was scheduled for July 2006, but cancelled due to the band citing "differences in policies" with the tour organizer; however, Mana did make a US appearance at the 2006 Anime Expo in Anaheim, California on July 1, where he announced that Moi dix Mois was planning to tour America sometime "within the calendar year". However, this US tour did not materialize. Bassist Sugiya and former Blue drummer Hayato provided live support until the October release of "Lamentful Miss", which included them as full members for the first time. On March 28, 2007, Moi dix Mois released their fourth album, Dixanadu.

On December 27, 2008, they held the Dis Inferno Vol.VI ~Last Year Party~, where they played a session gig along with Mana's fellow Malice Mizer guitarist Közi. Mana returned to Anime Expo at the Los Angeles Convention Center on July 2, 2009, this time with Moi dix Mois. Also in July, they went on a short two-gig coupling tour with Közi called Deep Sanctuary, playing on the 17 in Osaka and the 19 in Tokyo. At the V-Rock Festival '09 on October 24, Moi Dix Mois played two new songs, "Dead Scape" and "The Sect", and a new version of "The Prophet". In July 2010, they went on another tour with Közi, titled Deep Sanctuary II, this time with Malice Mizer bassist Yu~ki as a special guest at Akasaka Blitz on the 17. This was the first time in 9 years that the three Malice Mizer members were on stage together. Moi dix Mois' fifth album, D+Sect, was released on December 15, 2010.

=== 2011–present: 10th anniversary and K's death ===
On August 27, 2011, Mana announced that Moi dix Mois would be releasing a compilation album as part of their 10th anniversary celebrations. The album is composed of re-recordings of older songs, from the group's first two albums. Fans requested which songs were chosen through Mana's blog. The album, titled Reprise, was released on July 11, 2012 and includes the new song "Je l'aime". On April 7, 2012, Moi dix Mois performed at Sakura-Con 2012 in Seattle, Washington.

To celebrate their tenth anniversary, Moi dix Mois held a special concert at Shinjuku Blaze on March 20, 2013. At the end, former members Juka, Kazuno and Tohru reunited with Mana for a one-off performance of the group's original lineup.

On May 19, 2014, guitarist K was found dead at his home by relatives. A memorial concert was held on September 15 where Moi dix Mois performed, including the new song "Beast Side" that was composed in memory of the guitarist. His replacement, Ryux formerly from the band Omega Dripp, was announced by Mana on December 3.

In 2023, Moi dix Mois teamed up with Versailles, D and Matenrou Opera for the four-date Japanese Visual Metal tour between September 22 and October 2. The four bands collaborated on the song "Kyōsōkyoku ~Tanbinaru Kettō~", which was released as a single credited to the JVM Roses Blood Symphony.

== Members ==
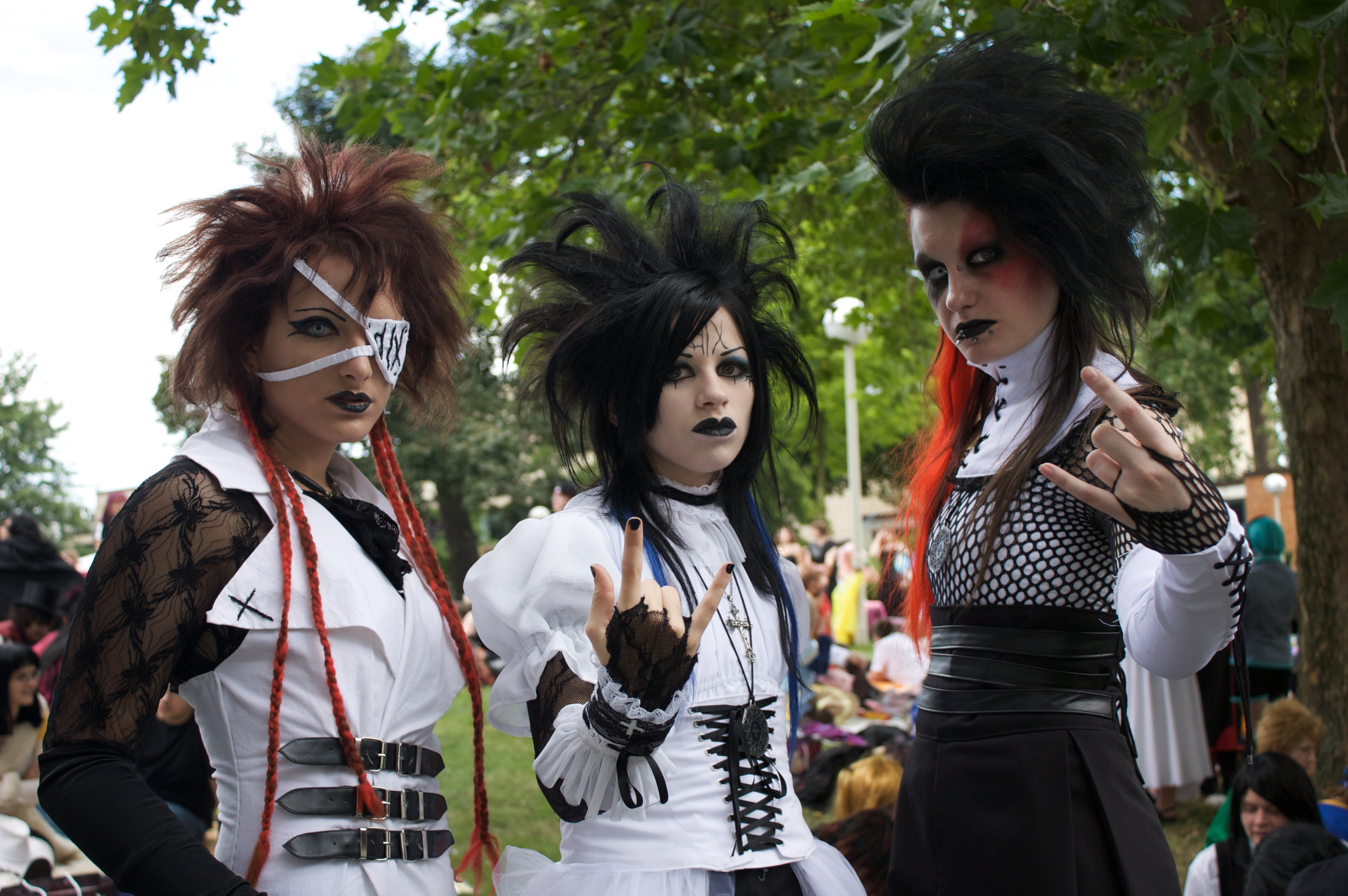
German fans cosplaying as Seth, Mana and K in 2009

Current members

- Mana – guitar, keyboards, programming (2002–present)
- Seth – lead vocals (2006–present)
- Sugiya – bass (2006–present)
- Hayato – drums (2006–present)
- Ryux – guitar (2014–present)

Former members

- Juka – lead vocals (2002–2005)
- Kazuno – bass (2002–2006)
- Tohru – drums (2004–2006)
- K – guitar, vocals (2002–2014; his death)

== Discography ==
Studio albums

- Dix Infernal (March 19, 2003), Oricon Albums Chart Peak Position: No. 77
- Nocturnal Opera (July 20, 2004) No. 116
- Beyond the Gate (March 1, 2006) No. 84
- Dixanadu (March 28, 2007) No. 158
- D+Sect (December 15, 2010) No. 113

Compilation albums

- Reprise (July 11, 2012) No. 102

Singles

- "Dialogue Symphonie" (November 19, 2002), Oricon Singles Chart Peak Position: No. 97
- "Shadows Temple" (May 31, 2004) No. 103
- "Pageant" (October 6, 2004) No. 40
- "Lamentful Miss" (October 4, 2006) No. 73

Home videos

- Dix Infernal ~Scars of Sabbath~ (December 16, 2003), Oricon DVDs Chart Peak Position: No. 274
- Europe Tour 2005 -Invite to Immorality- (July 27, 2005)
- Dixanadu ~Fated "Raison d'être"~ Europe Tour 2007 (January 30, 2008) No. 206
