= Teru (guitarist) =

Japanese guitarist

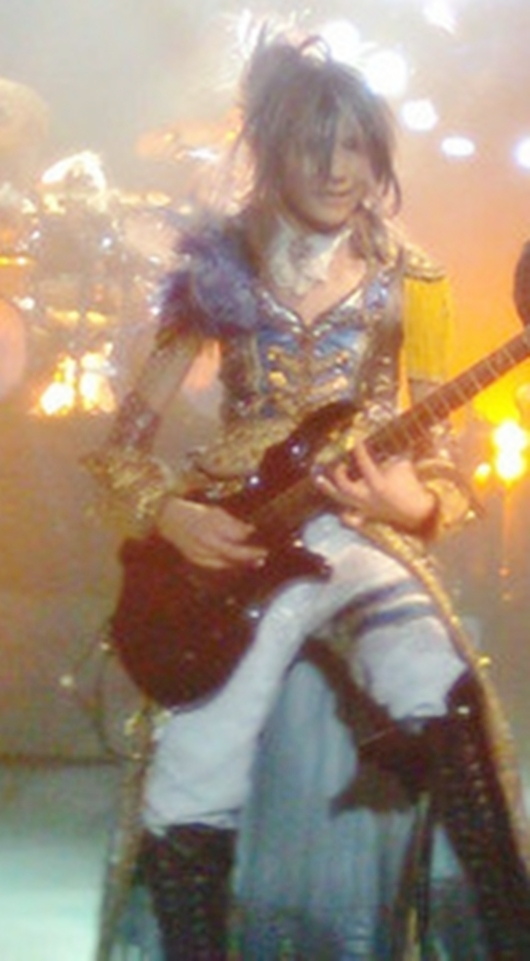
- Teru in 2010

Background information
- Also known as: TERU, wait A minute
- Born: April 10; Kyoto, Japan
- Genres: Power metal; symphonic metal; neoclassical metal
- Occupations: Musician; songwriter
- Instrument: Guitar
- Years active: 2001–present
- Member of: Versailles; Jupiter
- Formerly of: Hizaki Grace Project; Aikaryu
- Website: teruism.com

Teru (stylized as TERU) is a Japanese visual kei metal musician. He is best known as guitarist for the symphonic power metal band Versailles. He is also a member of Jupiter. Before Versailles he was previously in Aikaryu and supported his future bandmate Hizaki in his solo project.

== Biography ==
Teru joined Aikaryu (藍華柳) in 2002, replacing guitarist Death. In August 2003 they signed to Crow Music (the same label as Hizaki's band Crack Brain) and released their first single the following month. For the next three years they toured extensively, had numerous releases and several line-up changes. But in early 2006, they were involved in a car accident with most members having serious injuries. While the members recovered Teru participated in Hizaki's solo project, Hizaki Grace Project. In December Aikaryu regrouped and performed a small tour. But in April 2007, they decided to disband.

Teru joined Hizaki's solo band, Hizaki Grace Project, in October 2006. Which also included Yuu (Jakura) on bass, Mikage (Babylon) on drums and Juka (Moi dix Mois) on vocals. They released three albums; Dignity of Crest, Ruined Kingdom and Curse of Virgo, and on December 24, 2007 had their latest live performance.

In 2007, he was recruited for Versailles by Hizaki and Kamijo, after being recommended by the Rock May-Kan venue. They quickly developed a large following worldwide, having their debut EP released domestically in Europe, and to date have gone on two world tours, which took them across Asia, Europe and Latin America.

Teru is also an artist, having designed many releases for Kamijo's record label Sherow Artist Society under the alias "Wait a Minute" (stylized as wait A minute), including for Versailles, Hizaki Grace Project and Matenrou Opera. He even gave a lecture at a seminar on the development of Japanese pop culture, held by the Kyoto University of Art and Design on November 25, 2010. He also designed the artwork for the 2015 album, Venom, by American heavy metal band, Impellitteri.

In January 2011, he and the rest of Versailles started starring in their own TV mini drama called Onegai Kanaete Versailles (おねがいかなえてヴェルサイユ; "Fulfill My Wish Versailles"). The show also starred Rina Koike and aired on Mainichi Broadcasting System and TV Kanagawa until March. Both Teru and Hizaki participated in the Blue Planet Japan project, which was created in response to the 2011 Tōhoku earthquake and tsunami. The project is comprised on many visual kei artists, including members of Daizystripper, heidi., Matenrou Opera, and Dolly. They performed live at Shibuya O-West on June 25 and released the single "Hitotsu Dake ~We are the One~" on September 14, with the proceeds from the single donated to the victims.

On August 9, 2011, the second anniversary of Jasmine You's death, Teru composed and dedicated the song "「For You」" to his former bandmate.

On July 20, 2012, Versailles announced they were stopping all activities at the end of the year. On April 1, 2013, every member of Versailles minus singer Kamijo announced they had formed a new band named Jupiter. They recruited Zin as vocalist and released their debut single, "Blessing of the Future", in the summer.

== Equipment ==
Current

- ESP 激鉄 "Geki-Tetsu" Teru Custom Black

Other

- ESP Antelope Black
- ESP Reindeer Teru Custom See Thru Black
- ESP Jerk Teru Custom
- Strat Type Guitar Cherry Burst with EMG pickups
- Strat Type Guitar Black
- Zoom G7.1UT
- Custom Audio Electronics Cables
- TC Electronic G Major
- Korg DTR-1 Rack Tuner
- EX-PRO Wireless System
- Furman Power Conditioner
- BOSS FC-50 Midi Foot Controller
- ENGL, Hughes & Kettner, Bogner, Brunetti, Mesa Boogie & Marshall Amps

== Discography ==
=== With Hizaki Grace Project ===
Albums

- Dignity of Crest (January 1, 2007)
- Ruined Kingdom (September 19, 2007)
- Curse of Virgo (December 26, 2007)

DVD

- Eien no Kokuin (永遠の刻印; February 17, 2007, distributed at concert)
- Monshou (紋章; May 9, 2007)
