= Hizaki =

Japanese musician

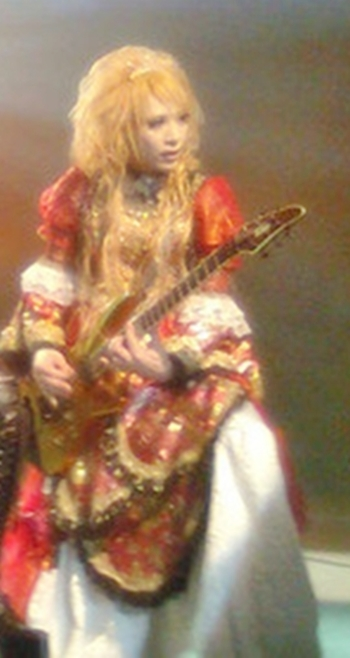
- Hizaki in 2010

Background information
- Also known as: Hizaki (緋咲)
- Born: February 17, 1979 (age 47); Shiga, Japan
- Origin: Kyoto, Japan
- Genres: Power metal; symphonic metal; neoclassical metal
- Occupations: Musician; songwriter; record producer
- Instruments: Guitar; bass
- Years active: 1997–present
- Member of: Versailles; Jupiter
- Website: hizaki-grace.com

Hizaki (stylized as HIZAKI, born February 17, 1979) is a Japanese visual kei metal musician. He is best known as the guitarist of the symphonic power metal band Versailles. He is also a member of Jupiter and has a solo career. Before forming Versailles, he was in several independent bands.

== Early life ==
Hizaki grew up in the countryside of Shiga Prefecture. He liked classical music in kindergarten, especially the violin, but his parents refused to let him learn the violin or piano. When he was in sixth grade his older brother started to learn guitar, and after Hizaki's first time playing with it, he "dove into music." Even at that young age he hated playing other people's songs, and wanted to create his own. Already a fan of Loudness and X Japan, Hizaki wanted to play lead guitar, but was not skilled enough for their songs at the time and so created his own guitar exercises. After studying diligently, Hizaki was quite skilled by middle school, but had no one around him at his level. He entered high school during Japan's band boom and so finally had others to play with in a band, but had to lower his skill level in order to fit in. While unwavered in his love of metal and visual kei, his friends preferred punk or grunge. As such, Hizaki said he had no fun in the band and that his high school days were "quite gloomy."

After graduating, Hizaki moved to Kyoto and finally found the music scene he always longed for. Already comfortable wearing makeup from shows in high school, he formed a visual kei band with a former upperclassman of his and the upperclassman's friends. He explained that ever since he started guitar, he felt that being able to play was not enough, one must be good-looking or put on a great performance; "I always thought about how I could stand out on stage, and eventually, my conclusion was to look like a girl." In 2020, Hizaki remarked that his visual kei style of makeup and skirts has been the same since high school. He also noted that he has a lot of childhood photographs where he is wearing red clothes, possibly being the reason a lot of his stage costumes are red.

== Career ==
Hizaki debuted as guitarist for the Kyoto-based visual kei band Garnet Grave in 1997. After two years, Hizaki and bassist Hizumi departed from Garnet Grave to form Crack Brain with guitarist Airi (Madeth Gray'll).

In 2002, Crack Brain disbanded and Hizaki and Airi formed the band Gurotesuku Romantikkaa (グロテスクロマンティッカー), who in May 2003 changed their name to Schwardix Marvally. They released two EPs, one composed of cover songs from various bands. Soon after releasing the two EPs, Schwardix Marvally disbanded in 2004.

Hizaki then proceeded to start a solo career that same year and released Maiden Ritual. He published two more EPs: Dance with Grace and Maiden Ritual -Experiment Edition- with a variety of musicians in the visual kei scene. In 2005 he put his solo work on hold and joined Sulfuric Acid, staying until they disbanded in October 2006. On October 31, Hizaki supported Lareine at their last concert.

He then restarted solo activities and formed his solo group, Hizaki Grace Project, with Hikaru (Izabel Varosa) on vocals, Yuu (Jakura) on bass and support drummer Seiji (Sulfuric Acid). After recruiting Mikage (Babylon) on drums, Teru (Aikaryu) on guitar and Juka (Moi dix Mois) on vocals, they released the album Dignity of Crest. Hizaki Grace Project's album, Curse of Virgo, was released on December 26, 2007.

In early 2007, he became support for Node of Scherzo, a project fronted by Kamijo (Lareine), Juka and Kaya (Schwarz Stein), and also supported by Jasmine You and Asagi (D). At Node of Scherzo's first live performance on March 14, Kamijo and Hizaki announced they were forming a band together. On March 30, the details of the band were announced, it would be named Versailles and also included drummer Yuki (Sugar Trip) and Hizaki Grace Project's Jasmine You and Teru. Hizaki's solo work was put on hold while he focused on Versailles.

On September 23, 2008, Hizaki modeled clothing for Baby, The Stars Shine Bright on the runway at Individual Fashion Expo IV. On July 15, 2010, he partook in the one-night only revival of Crack Brain, at a concert for their old record label, Crow Music.

In January 2011, he and the rest of Versailles started starring in their own TV mini drama called Onegai Kanaete Versailles (おねがいかなえてヴェルサイユ; "Fulfill My Wish Versailles"). The show also starred Rina Koike and aired on Mainichi Broadcasting System and TV Kanagawa until March.

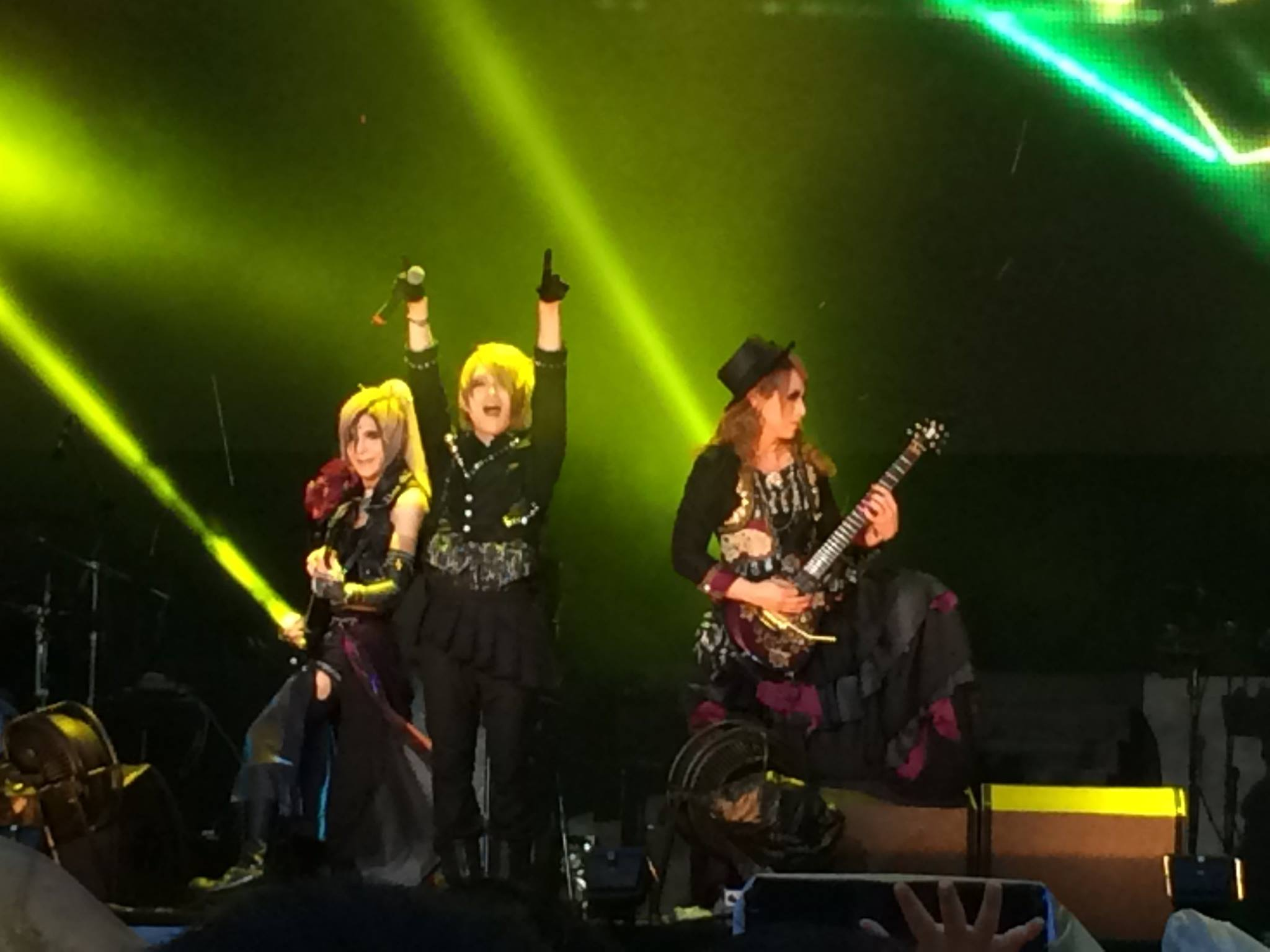
Hizaki (right) performing with Jupiter in 2015.

In response to the 2011 Tōhoku earthquake and tsunami on March 11, Hizaki composed and dedicated the song "Prayer" to its victims. Both Hizaki and Teru participated in the Blue Planet Japan project, which was created in response to the Tōhoku earthquake and tsunami. The project is composed of many visual kei artists, including members of Daizystripper, heidi., Matenrou Opera and Dolly. They performed live at Shibuya O-West on June 25 and released the single "Hitotsu Dake ~We are the One~" on September 14, with the proceeds from the single donated to the victims.

Hizaki composed the music for the title track of Kaya's January 2012 single "Vampire Requiem". On July 20, Versailles announced they were stopping all activities by the end of the year. Hizaki, Kaya, Versailles bassist Masashi, Ken Morioka (Soft Ballet), Kenta Harada and Chargeeeeee (Omega Dripp, ZIZ) performed in a special session band on October 7 at Shinjuku Loft.

On April 1, 2013, every member of Versailles minus singer Kamijo announced they had formed a new band named Jupiter. They recruited Zin as vocalist and released their debut single, "Blessing of the Future", in the summer. That same year Hizaki participated in the Dead End Tribute – Song of Lunatics - album, paying tribute to the band Dead End by performing on the cover of their song "Dress Burning".

Hizaki returned to solo activities in 2015 with short European and South American tours. He released his first solo album in 11 years, Rosario, on August 3, 2016, via major record label Warner Music Japan. A mini album, Back to Nature, was released by Zeno Records on November 27, 2019. The single "Pavane" was released on July 15, 2020, and credited to Hizaki grace project. The solo mini album Rusalka was released on February 17, 2021. As Hizaki's first international solo release, Setsuzoku Records combined his past two mini albums into Rusalka + Back to Nature, which was released on September 17, 2021. Hizaki also provided guest guitar to "Zenith" from Ancient Myth's 2021 album ArcheoNyx.

== Music ==
The focus of Hizaki's solo work is guitar instrumentals, creating the main melody with the guitar. He said the idea is to replace the vocalist with a guitar. Rather than technical skill, he thinks his ability to create melodies is where he excels. Hizaki said his approach to guitar solos in a band is different than other guitarists; instead of trying to match the flow of the song and insert a solo, he tries to "bring the song into another dimension." Instead of playing "on top of the hook," Hizaki creates a song within a song. He suggested this was influenced by She-Ja (Gargoyle, Animetal, Volcano), who he said used to play solos "completely irrelevant" to the song.

Hizaki revealed that he hates practicing guitar: "I'm the kind of person who wants to create music whenever I have a guitar in my hands. Practicing studiously is something I really hate, so I almost never do it." He admitted that he regresses and loses his touch, frequently not playing for two days in a row. He said he is unsure of how precise his picking is, but is sure that he has a "heavy" way of picking.

Hizaki admitted that at the beginning of Jupiter it was pretty similar to Versailles, as it had four of the same five members. But when Versailles reunited, they chose distinct directions for each, and in 2020, said the main difference was the vocalist's key. He described Kuze as having a "powerful, masculine voice with transcendent high tones while Versailles' vocalist has a mid-range voice with a great aesthetic appeal." Since the key is different, Hizaki's approach to composing music for each is different as well, and he views the two bands as completely different.

== Hizaki Grace Project members ==
Last line-up

- Hizaki – guitar
- Yuu/Jasmine You – bass
- Teru – guitar
- Mikage – drums
- Juka – vocals

Former members

- Hikaru – vocals
- Seiji – drums (support member)

== Equipment ==
Current

- ESP Maiden Hizaki Custom Rose

Other

- ESP Horizon-III Hizaki Custom Pearl White Gold w/flake
- ESP Horizon-III Hizaki Custom Illusion
- ESP Bottom Line GT
- Boss GT-10 Guitar Effects Processor
- Boss SD-1 Super Overdrive
- Ibanez Jemini Distortion Pedal
- Ibanez TS-9 Tube Screamer
- Marshall Guvnor
- Morley Wah Pedal
- Custom Audio Electronics Cables
- TC Electronic G Major
- Korg DTR-1 Rack Tuner
- EX-PRO Wireless System
- Furman Power Conditioner
- Roland FC-200 Midi Foot Controller
- Marshall JVM410H
- Hughes & Kettner, Bogner, Brunetti, Mesa Boogie and Laney Amps
- Keeley Katana Boost Pedal
- Boorocks MD-1 LEON Multi-Driver

== Discography ==
Albums and EPs

- Maiden Ritual (September 29, 2004)
- Dance with grace (April 27, 2005; two editions: regular was instrumental)
- Maiden Ritual -Experiment Edition- (May 11, 2005)
  - The song "Tragic Serenade" was replaced by the instrumental "Scarlet", while "Ritual" has been replaced by its instrumental version.
- Grace Special Package I (2005)
  - Three disc box set: includes Dance with grace, Maiden Ritual -Experiment Edition- and bonus CD-R with "Members Comment" and instrumental version of "Tragic Serenade".
- Rosario (2016), Oricon Albums Chart Peak Position: No. 60
- Back to Nature (2019) No. 231
- Rusalka (2021) No. 132
- Rusalka + Back to Nature (2021, international only)
- The Zodiac Sign (June 12, 2024) No. 46

=== With Hizaki Grace Project ===
Albums

- Dignity of Crest (January 1, 2007)
- Ruined Kingdom (September 19, 2007)
- Curse of Virgo (December 26, 2007)

Singles

- "Pavane" (July 15, 2020)

Home videos

- Eien no Kokuin (永遠の刻印; February 17, 2007; distributed at concert)
- Monshou (紋章; May 9, 2007), Oricon DVDs Chart Peak Position: No. 264

Omnibuses

- Graceful Playboys (August 5, 2006; with "Race Wish")
- -Unique- (August 9, 2006; split EP with +Isolation, with "Solitude" and "Cradle")
- Summit 03 (November 29, 2009; with "Cradle")
- Final Summit 2000~2010: Sequence Records (February 16, 2011; with "Philosopher")

=== With Garnet Grave ===
- "Haitoku no Savior" (背徳のSavior; 1998, demo tape)

=== With Crack Brain ===
- "Crack Diary" (July 24, 1999; demo tape)
- "Sokubaku Izonshou" (緊縛依存症; April 18, 2000; demo tape)
- "Sunadokei" (砂時計; June 27, 2000; demo tape)
- "Kankinshitsu no Tobira" (監禁室の扉; April 14, 2001)
- -Reset- (March 23, 2002)
- "-Speed･R-" (May 11, 2002; freely distributed at concert at Meguro Rock-May-Kan)

=== With Schwardix Marvally ===
- Kairoroku ~Dai san Shou~ (回顧録～第三章～; August 20, 2003)
  - Four track EP with covers of Gargoyle, Luna Sea and Madeth Gray'll and one original song, track one credited to Gurotesuku Romantikkaa (グロテスクロマンティッカー).
- Heaven's Romance (January 28, 2004)
  **Released in two versions, each with a different bonus disc.
- Schwardix Marvally ~Tenkuu e no Monogatari~ (Schwardix Marvally～天空への物語～; January 1, 2007; compilation album)

=== With Sulfuric Acid ===
- "Vanilla Sky" (September 19, 2005; freely distributed at concert at Meguro Rock-May-Kan)
- "Aka Hebi -Kimi to Mita aka no Kioku-" (赤蛇 -君と見た赤の記憶-; December 28, 2005)
- "Ao Hebi -Boku no Naka no Aoi Yami-" (青蛇 -僕の中の青い闇-; December 28, 2005)
- 【s∧lfj'urik 'aesid】 (April 27, 2006)
- Kyousei Inyou [03-06] Ongenshuu (強制引用【03-06】音源集; November 29, 2006; compilation album)
- Final Summit 2000~2010: Sequence Records (February 16, 2011; omnibus with "Acid Trip")
