= Abigail Barrows =

American marine biologist

Abigail P. W. Barrows
- Education: University of Tasmania; College of the Atlantic
- Known for: microplastics research
- Scientific career
- Fields: Marine science
- Workplaces: Adventure Scientists

Abigail P. W. Barrows (born 1984) is an American marine research scientist and advocate based in Maine. Barrows is the Principal investigator for the Global Microplastics Initiative with Adventure Scientists, where she directs microplastics research that is used to inform conservation-focused legislation, and she initiated the first baseline data map of microplastic pollution distribution in the waters off the coast of Maine. Her primary interests are in research, seaweed and oyster farming, education, field methodology, and using scientific data to drive legislation and policy to lower single-use plastic.

== Early life and education ==
Barrows grew up in Stonington, Maine, a town on the island of Deer Isle, off the coast of Maine. Her family owned a small farm, which was part of how she discovered her love for animals. From a teenager, she knew she loved the outdoors after participating in an Outward Bound trip. She began to learn about and love the ocean which helped her pursue her career. Her interests are in research, oyster and seaweed farming, innovation, and working to reduce single-use plastic locally & globally. In 2006, Barrows graduated with a bachelor's degree in zoology, with a focus on marine biology from the University of Tasmania, Australia. After returning to Stonington, Maine, Barrows completed her master's degree in microplastics from the College of the Atlantic in Bar Harbor, Maine in 2018.

== Career ==
During her early career, Barrows worked in biology projects with seahorses. Barrows studies plastic pollution in global waterways. Barrows' biological studies led her to travel much of the world including Papua New Guinea, the Himalaya, and South and Central America. She later focused her studies on microplastics, having recognized plastic pollution as a global issue. Barrows has leveraged her research to help pass legislation to reduce plastic consumption.

In 2011, Barrows took a job coordinating educational programming at the Shaw Institute where she focused on environmental health. She later directed global microplastic pollution research from 2013 to 2017, and consequently published research in collaboration with the Shaw Institute. In December 2017, Abby played a part in accomplishing the enacting of a bill that would cease microbead containing products from being made within the state of Maine. She has published 12 scientific papers, where her work on microplastic prevalence has been cited hundreds of times. Burrows worked with Adventure Scientists, an organization that links researchers with outdoorsmen and women. This collaboration yielded the largest known and most diverse microplastics dataset as of 2019. Her work has identified that plastic pollution is present in New York’s Hudson River, and in popular bottled water brands - specifically, an average of 325 plastic particles were found for every litre of water being sold, in an analysis of 259 bottles, across 19 locations, in nine countries. In a study she contributed to, it was found that around an average of 300 million individual anthropogenic microfibers are released per day on the upper part of the Hudson River.

Barrows is currently the owner of Deer Isle Oyster Company, based in Stonington, Maine, where she is trying to develop and create plastic-free aquaculture gear, and operates an oyster aquaculture farm, Long Cove Sea Farm. This includes working on prototypes of wooden oyster cages, selling oysters in compostable beechwood bags, and testing a mycelium buoy, a fungal alternative to a plastic buoy. In 2021, Barrows was awarded a $15,000 grant by the USDA's Northeast Sustainable Agriculture Research and Education Program to identify ecologically friendly materials for aquaculture systems. As of 2023, Barrows operates Long Cove Sea Farm, a three-acre oyster farm in Maine, which yields approximately 40,000 oysters per year and develops plastic-free aquaculture equipment. Additionally, she was featured in a Patagonia video We Can Get There From Here where she further elaborates on her plastic-free oyster farm.

== Selected bibliography ==
- Microfibre Methodologies for the Field and Laboratory. Abigail P.W. Barrows and Courtney A. Neumann. In Polluting Textiles, pp. 15-32. Routledge, 2022.
- Global patterns for the spatial distribution of floating microfibers: Arctic Ocean as a potential accumulation zone. André R.A. Lima, Guilherme V.B. Ferreira, Abigail P.W. Barrows, Katie S. Christiansen, Gregg Treinish, Michelle C. Toshack. Journal of Hazardous Materials. 2021.
- A watershed-scale, citizen science approach to quantifying microplastic concentration in a mixed land-use river. Abigail P.W. Barrows, Katie S. Christiansen, Emma T. Bode, Timothy J. Hoellein. Water Research. 2018.
- Grab vs. neuston tow net: a microplastic sampling performance comparison and possible advances in the field. Abigail P. W. Barrows, Courtney A. Neumann, Michelle L. Berger and Susan D. Shaw. Analytical Methods, 2017.
- Mountains to the sea: River study of plastic and non-plastic microfiber pollution in the northeast USA. Rachael Z. Miller, Andrew J.R. Watts, Brooke O. Winslow, Tamara S. Galloway and Abigail P.W. Barrows. The Marine Pollution Bulletin. 2017.
