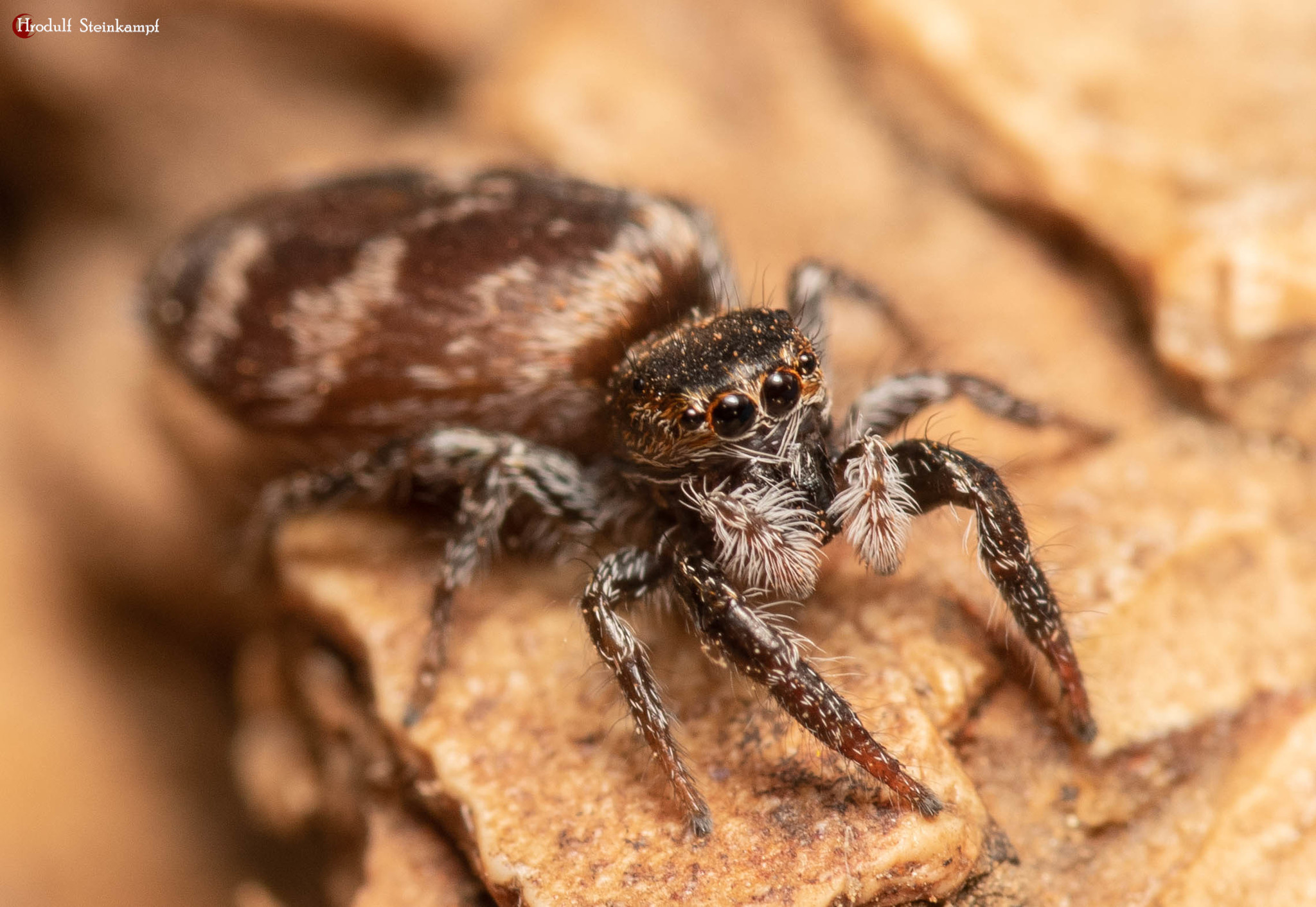

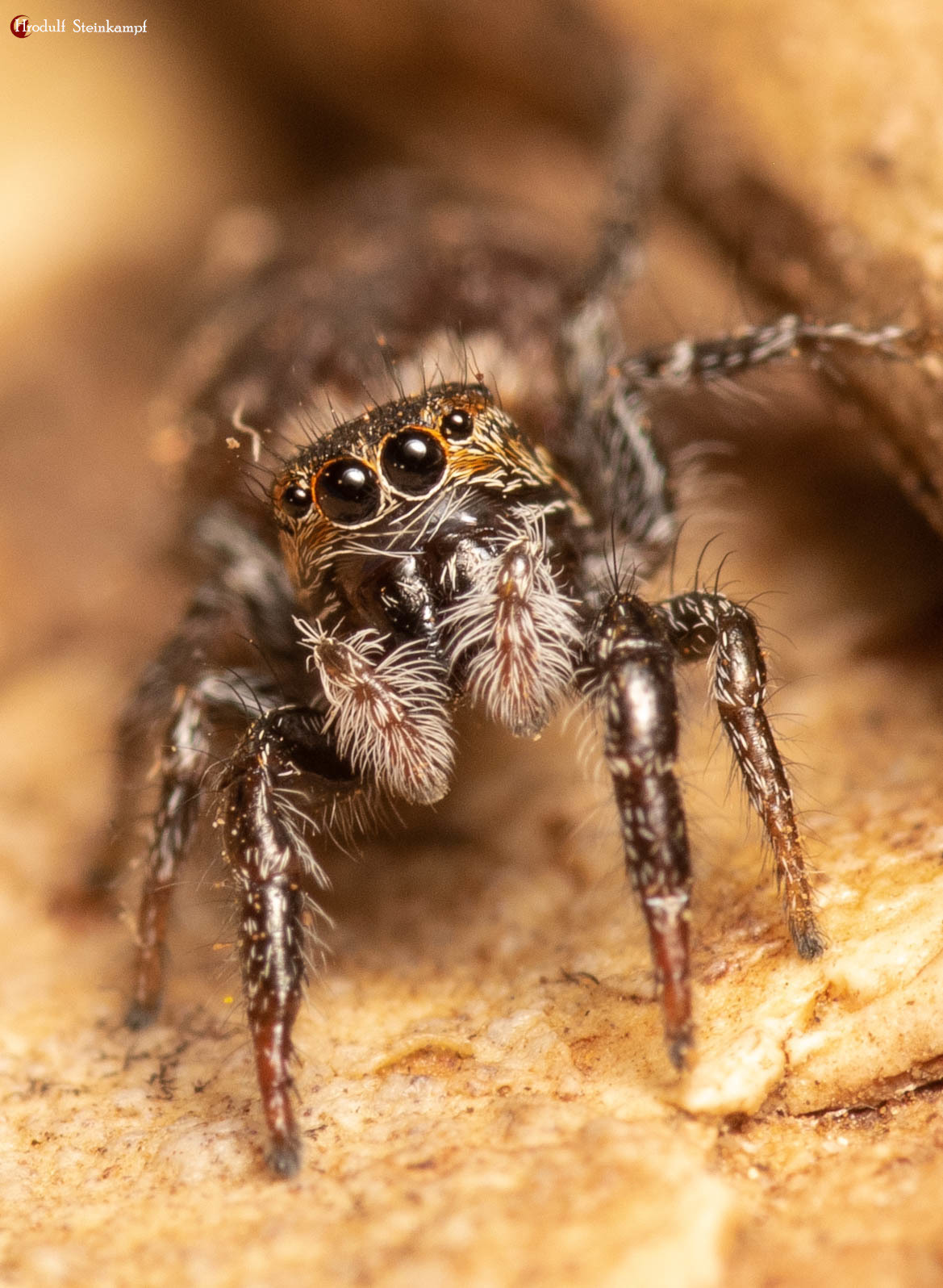

Scientific classification
- Kingdom: Animalia
- Phylum: Arthropoda
- Subphylum: Chelicerata
- Class: Arachnida
- Order: Araneae
- Infraorder: Araneomorphae
- Family: Salticidae
- Genus: Afraflacilla
- Species: A. karinae

Binomial name
- Afraflacilla karinae (Haddad & Wesołowska, 2011)

Synonyms
- Pseudicius karinae Haddad & Wesołowska, 2011

= Afraflacilla karinae =

Karin's Afraflacilla Jumping Spider

Species of spider

Afraflacilla karinae is a species of jumping spider in the genus Afraflacilla that is found in South Africa. The spider was first defined in 2011 by Charles Haddad and Wanda Wesołowska. They originally placed the species in the genus Pseudicius, but Jerzy Prószyński moved it in 2017 to Afraflacilla on the basis of shape of its copulatory organs. Only the male has been described. The spider is brown and medium-sized, with a carapace typically 2.1 mm (0.083 in) long and an abdomen 2.7 mm (0.11 in) long. The spider has brown legs, with longer and thicker front legs. It stridulates using its legs and carapace. Afraflacilla karinae is superficially similar to many other spiders in both the genera Afraflacilla and Pseudicius. It is most like Afraflacilla zuluensis, particularly in its size, external appearance and distribution. The species is best identified by the short blunt dorsal apophysis, or appendage, on its palpal bulb.

== Taxonomy ==
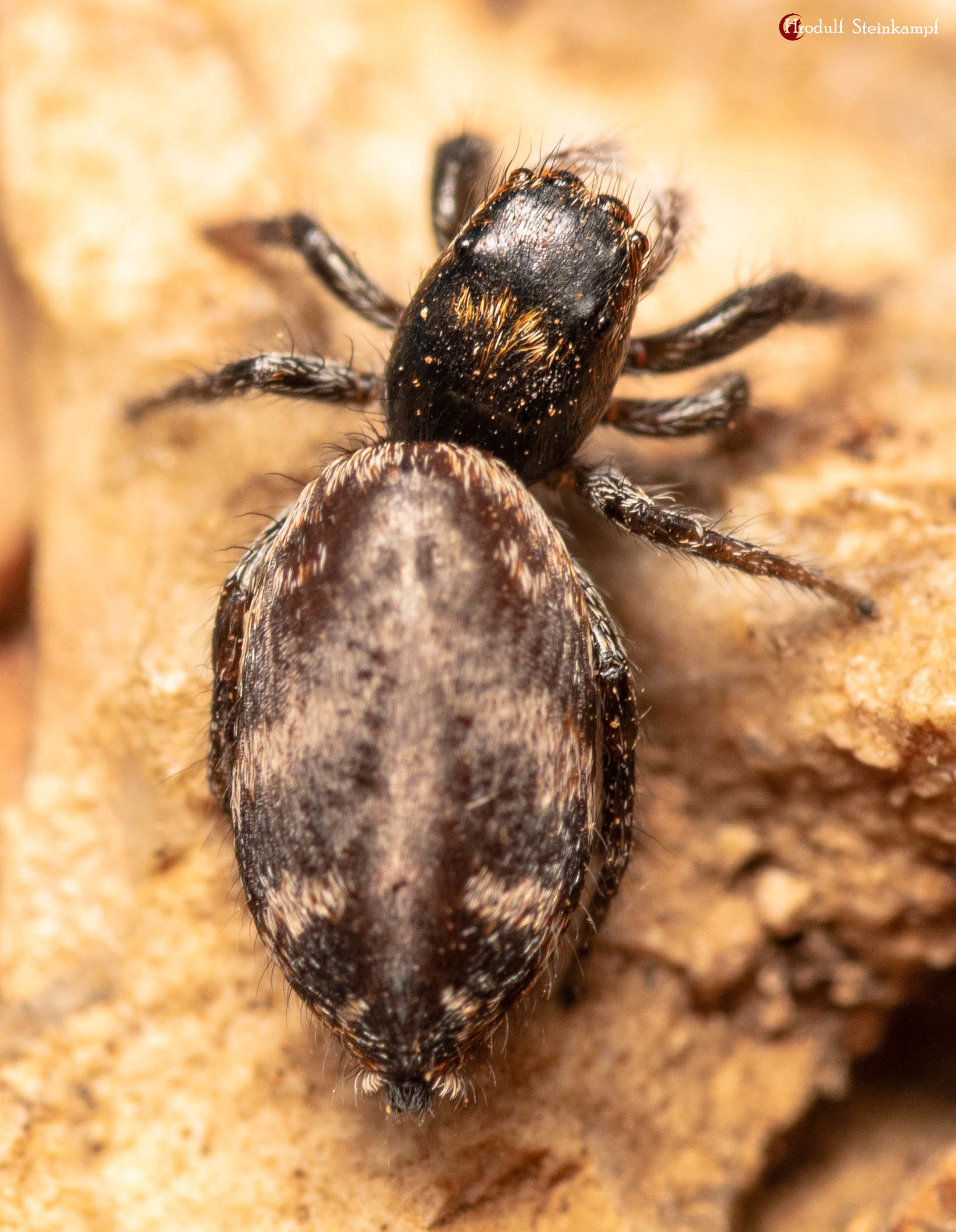

Afraflacilla karinae is a jumping spider that was first described by Charles Haddad and Wanda Wesołowska in 2011. It was one of more than 500 species that the Polish arachnologist Wesołowska had a part in identifying during her career, which makes her one of the most prolific scientists in the discipline. They allocated the species to the genus Pseudicius, first raised by Eugène Simon in 1885. The genus name is related to two Greek words that can be translated false and honest. The genus was provisionally placed alongside Icius that, despite looking superficially similar, has a different etymology. Indeed, Ekaterina Andreeva, Stefania Hęciak and Jerzy Prószyński looked to combine the genera in 1984. The two genera have similar spermathecal structure but work by Wayne Maddison in 1987 demonstrated that they have very different DNA.

The two genera were placed in the tribe Heliophaninae alongside Afraflacilla and Marchena. The tribe is ubiquitous across most continents of the world. Maddison renamed the tribe Chrysillini in 2015. The tribe is a member of the clade Saltafresia within the subfamily Salticoida. A year later, in 2016, Jerzy Prószyński moved the species to the genus Afraflacilla on the basis of the shape of the copulatory organs. It was one of more than 40 species that were transferred between the two genera at the time. Afraflacilla had been created by Lucien Betland and Jacques Millot in 1941. It is also a member of the tribe Heliophaninae. Prószyński allocated the genus to the Pseudiciines group of genera, which was named after the genus Pseudicius. The species is named after Karin Haddad, the mother of the lead author of the paper that first described the spider.

== Description ==
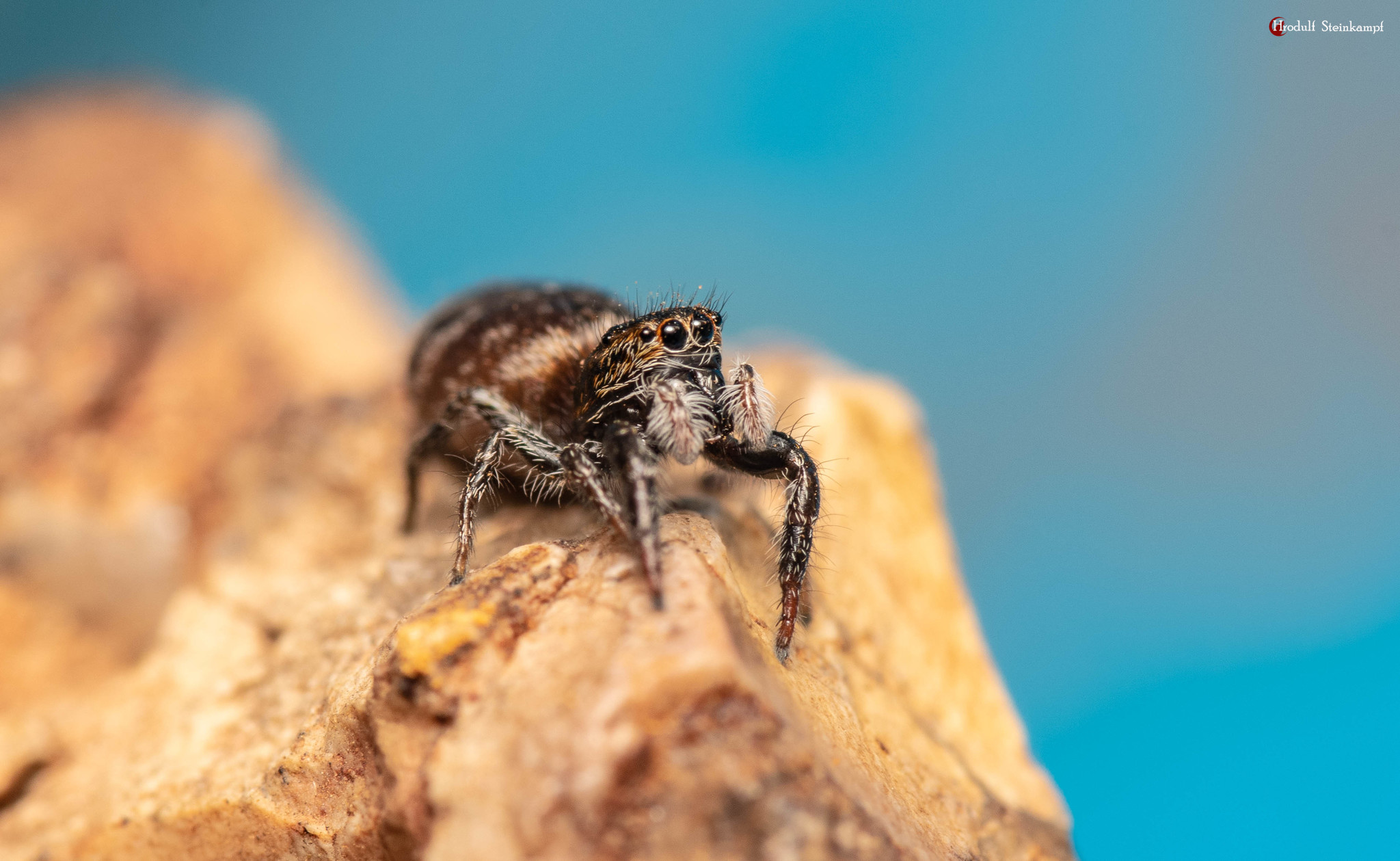

Afraflacilla karinae is a medium-sized spider with an elongated and flattened body. The male has a very flat carapace that is typically 2.1 mm (0.083 in) long and 1.4 mm (0.055 in) wide. It is brown, lighter towards the middle, and covered with brown hairs, with a nearly-black eye field. There are long bristles on the first row of eyes. The spider has brown chelicerae, labium and maxilae and sternum. The abdomen is typically 2.7 mm (0.11 in) long and 1.4 mm (0.055 in) wide. The top is blackish-brown and has a vague pattern of eight white patches arranged in pairs. The underside is yellowish-grey. The spinnerets are dark. The legs are brown and covered in long thin hairs. The front legs are longer, stouter and darker with a swollen tibia that has one short and two long spines. It has other spines on its legs and carapace that it uses for stridulation. The pedipalps are light brown. The spider has a distinctively very long retrolateral tibial apophysis, or appendage, with a curved tip and a short blunt dorsal apophysis.

The female has not been described. Haddad and Wesołowska speculated that it could be the species identified as Pseudicius solitarius. The two have a very similar distribution. However, Prószyński moved that species to the genus Psenuc in 2017 due to its dissimilar copulatory organs to the spider in the genus Afraflacilla.

The spider is similar to others in the genus. It is closely related to Afraflacilla altera, Afraflacilla elegans, Afraflacilla venustula and Afraflacilla zuluensis. It is particularly similar in size and external appearance to the last species. The shape of the dorsal apophysis is distinctive. Afraflacilla zuluensis has a lobe at the base that this species lacks. The spider is superficially hard to distinguish from species in the genus Pseudicius. For example, it can be confused with Pseudicius gracilis except for its shorter apophysis.

== Distribution and habitat ==
Afraflacilla karinae is endemic in South Africa. It lives in similar places to Afraflacilla zuluensis. The holotype, a male, was collected in Bloemfontein in 2000. The species lives in the bark of Eucalyptus trees.
