= Susan Shaw (conservationist) =

American scientist, explorer, conservationist, author (1943–2022)

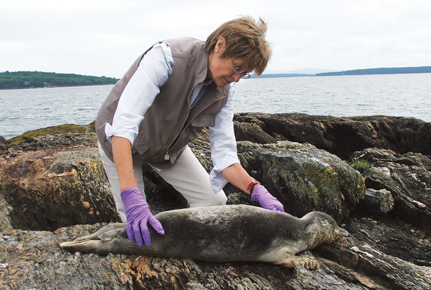
- Shaw examining a harbor seal
- Born: October 24, 1943; Dallas, Texas, U.S.
- Died: January 27, 2022 (aged 78); New York City, U.S.
- Education: University of Texas at Austin; Columbia University School of the Arts; Columbia University School of Public Health
- Spouse: Cynthia Stroud
- Parents: Edward Carrington Shaw (father); Lois Bonner (mother)
- Awards: Society of Woman Geographers' Gold Medal Award; Explorers Club Citation of Merit; Gulf of Maine Visionary Award
- Scientific career
- Fields: Environmental health Aquatic toxicology
- Workplaces: University at Albany, SUNY; Shaw Institute
- Website: www.shawinstitute.org

Susan D. Shaw (October 24, 1943 – January 27, 2022) was an American environmental health scientist, marine toxicologist, explorer, ocean conservationist, and author. A Doctor of Public Health, she was a professor in the Department of Environmental Health Sciences at the School of Public Health at the State University of New York at Albany, and Founder/President of the Shaw Institute, a nonprofit scientific institution with a mission to improve human and ecological health through innovative science and strategic partnerships. Shaw is globally recognized for pioneering high-impact environmental research on ocean pollution, climate change, oil spills, and plastics that has fueled public policy over three decades. In 1983, with landscape photographer Ansel Adams, she published Overexposure, the first book to document the health hazards of photographic chemicals. Shaw is credited as the first scientist to show that brominated flame retardant chemicals used in consumer products have contaminated marine mammals and commercially important fish stocks in the northwest Atlantic Ocean. She became the first scientist to dive into the Gulf of Mexico oil slick following the 2010 BP Deepwater Horizon oil rig explosion to investigate the impacts of chemical dispersants used in response to the spill.

Recognized as an outspoken voice on emerging contaminants like plastic, Shaw traveled globally to raise awareness on toxic legacy of man-made chemicals and its impact on public health and the environment.

== Education and early career ==
Shaw was born in Dallas, Texas, the daughter of Edward Carrington and Lois (née Bonner) Shaw.

She received a Bachelor of Arts degree from the University of Texas in 1967 with a major in Plan II, an interdisciplinary honors program modeled after the Harvard Society of Fellows Program. She was selected for the UT-Chilean Exchange Program in 1964, and spent a year in Chile as a Fulbright Scholar. Shaw earned two degrees from Columbia University: an MFA degree in film in 1970, and a doctorate in Public Health/Environmental Health Sciences (Dr.P.H.) in 1999.

In 1980, Ansel Adams commissioned her to write Overexposure, published in 1983 as the first book to document the health hazards of photographic chemicals used in the darkroom. A second edition of the book was published in 1991.

Shaw founded the Shaw Institute in Blue Hill, Maine in 1990 following the deaths of 20,000 harbor seals inhabiting polluted waters of northwestern Europe. This wildlife “signal” event was followed by other mass die-offs of marine mammals in polluted marine regions.

Advancing understanding of the impacts of toxic chemicals on marine mammal health became the institute's research focus over the next two decades. In the institute's mission to "discover and expose environmental threats to people and wildlife through innovative science," its focus areas are human exposure, plastics and microplastics, marine wildlife exposure, oil spill response, and Maine coastal monitoring.

== Research ==
For three decades, Shaw's work focused on the health effects of environmental chemical exposure in marine wildlife and humans.

In 2000, the Shaw Institute began its long-term research focused on marine sentinel species to characterize the extent of contamination of the northwest Atlantic marine ecosystem from Maine to New York. Funded by the National Oceanic and Atmospheric Administration (NOAA), this region-wide effort has produced a large body of data on a wide range of persistent organic pollutants, including flame retardants, in marine mammals and fish that has placed the region in a global perspective. This work has shown that levels of toxic chemicals, such as polychlorinated biphenyls (PCBs), in northwest Atlantic harbor seals are among the highest in the world.

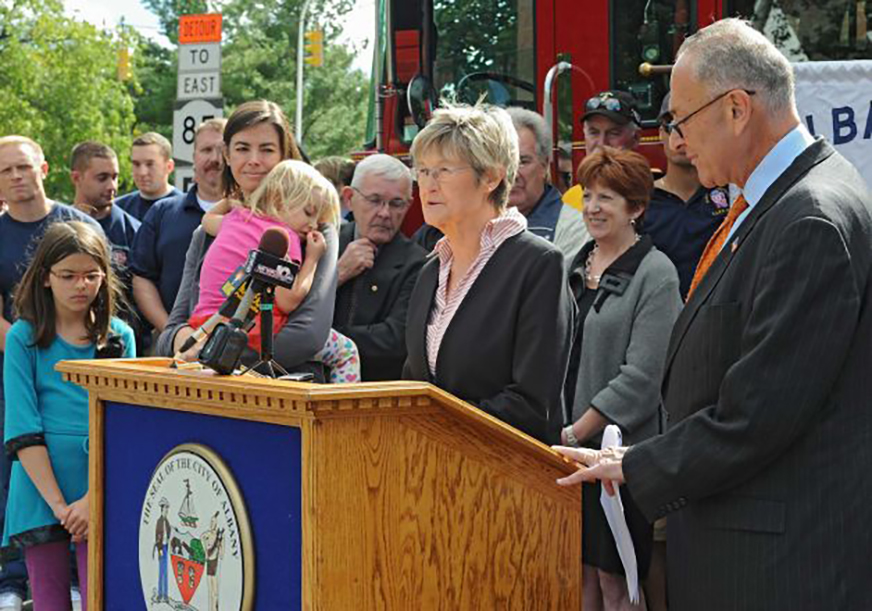
Dr. Shaw at a press conference with Senator Chuck Schumer in Albany, NY, in support of his bill, The Children and Fire Fighter Protection Act

In 2007, Shaw was credited as the first scientist to show that brominated flame retardant chemicals used in household and consumer products have contaminated marine mammals and fish in the northwest Atlantic Ocean. This information helped support toxics policy reform in the state of Maine when the Legislature banned Deca-BDE from household products as of 2010.

That same year, Shaw was lead author on a review paper entitled Halogenated Flame Retardants: Do the Fire Safety Benefits Justify the Risks?, which challenged the efficacy of these chemicals in preventing fire deaths. It presented a large body of scientific evidence of the negative health effects, including cancer, that are associated with exposure to halogenated flame retardants in consumer products. The paper had national policy implications, laying the groundwork for the San Antonio Statement, which cited the need for regulatory action on halogenated flame retardant chemicals worldwide. It was signed by more than 300 scientists from 30 countries. Shaw's paper and the statement were, in turn, the basis for the Chicago Tribune's 2012 exposé of the chemical industry's campaign to market harmful flame retardant chemicals to the American public.

== BP Oil Spill ==
In May 2010, a month after the explosion of the Deepwater Horizon oil rig in the Gulf of Mexico, Shaw dove into the oil slick to investigate the impact of the chemical dispersant Corexit, which was being used to contain the oil spill. Her findings informed the national debate on the dangers of chemical dispersant use. She maintained that the dispersant-oil mixture was more toxic to wildlife and human health than the oil alone, because of the increased exposure to hydrocarbons in the water column, and the synergistic toxicity of Corexit and oil components combined.

Shaw was appointed to the Strategic Sciences Working Group (SSWG), convened by the US Department of the Interior, to assess the consequences of the oil spill and make policy recommendations to federal agencies. In September 2010, she drafted a scientific memo titled “It’s Not About Dose” on behalf of the SSWG stating there is no safe level of exposure to cancer-causing hydrocarbons in oil. The memo warned that the use of Corexit dispersants, in combination with crude oil, would result in long-term damage to wildlife and human health in the Gulf region. The Shaw Institute subsequently launched Gulf EcoTox, an independent investigation into the effects of oil and chemical dispersants in the food web.

Shaw predicted the decimation of deep-water coral, species known to be sensitive to the Corexit-oil mixture, and the deaths of dolphins from unavoidable inhalation of the mixture as they surfaced to breathe. Both outcomes have since occurred. She also predicted with certainty the human health crisis in the Gulf today, stating that a scientific review found that “five of the Corexit ingredients are linked to cancer, 33 are associated with skin irritation from rashes to burns, 33 are linked to eye irritation, 11 are or are suspected of being potential respiratory toxins or irritants, and 10 are suspected kidney toxins.”

She delivered three TEDx talks discussing the long-term damage to the ecosystem and the impending human health crisis in the Gulf as a result of exposure to the oil-Corexit mixture. She appeared in documentary films on the oil spill, including Animal Planet's Black Tide: Voices of the Gulf and Green Planet's The Big Fix.

== Later work ==
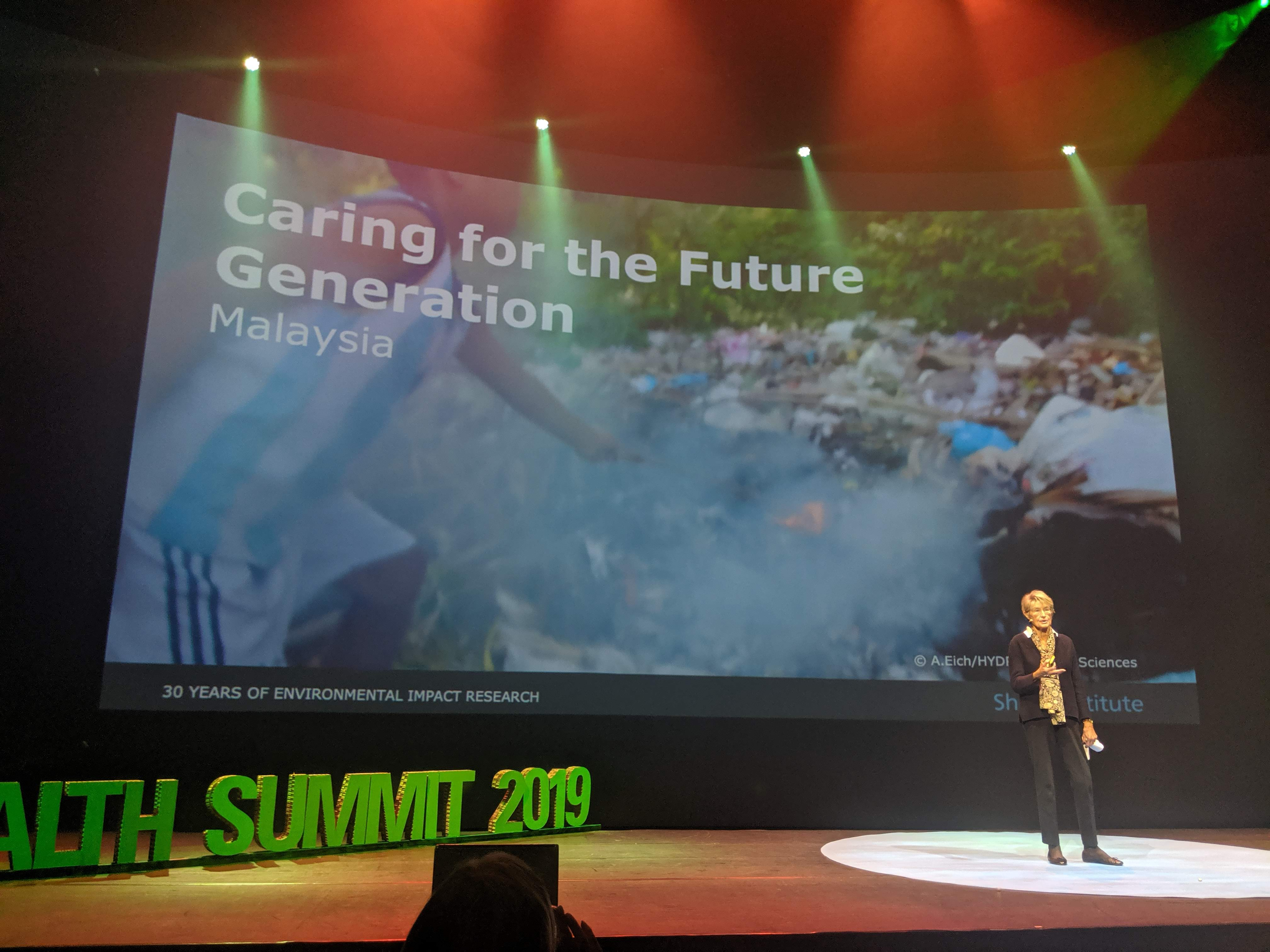
Dr. Shaw onstage at the Plastic Health Summit in Amsterdam, 2019

The Shaw Institute's research examines the sources, fate, exposure pathways, tissue-specific bioaccumulation/biomagnification, and health effects of organic halogenated chemicals and other toxic man-made chemicals in the environment. The organization's current work focuses on highly exposed populations, including firefighters, to indoor contaminants including flame retardants and carcinogenic combustion by-products that may relate to their elevated rates of cancer. An expert on marine pollution, Shaw led a multinational project with scientists from Sweden, Greenland and Iceland to assess the converging impacts of climate change and flame retardant chemicals on marine mammals from the US Atlantic, Baltic, and Arctic seas.

In 2013, Shaw was lead investigator of a study that tested a group of firefighters in San Francisco and found that their blood contains high levels of flame retardants and cancer-causing chemicals such as dioxins and furans, produced by the burning of flame-retarded household materials. The study's findings suggested that chemical exposure during firefighting may carry higher risk for multiple cancers than previously demonstrated. Based on these findings, in 2014, the Institute announced plans for a long-term study of chemical exposure and cancer risk in U.S. firefighters.

In 2012 Shaw launched a study into microplastics in the Gulf of Maine that influenced a nationwide ban of microbeads in cosmetics. Shaw Institute scientists led a 2018 study on the uptake and expulsion of microplastic fibers by blue mussels (Mytilus edulis) in the Gulf of Maine. In 2018, the Shaw Institute partnered with the international Plastics Health Coalition in order to advance understanding of the damaging effects of microplastics in the human body and to promote plastic reduction across multiple sectors on a global scale. Shaw's final work was to draw attention to the health hazards faced by children employed as waste pickers and e-waste recyclers.

== Honors and awards ==
Shaw was a Woodrow Wilson Visiting Fellow to U.S. universities and was named a Gulf of Maine Visionary by the Gulf of Maine Council on the Marine Environment in 2007. In May 2011, she became the 19th recipient of the Society of Woman Geographers' Gold Medal Award dating back to 1933, when Amelia Earhart became its first recipient. In March 2012, Shaw received the Explorers Club Citation of Merit Award for her work in ocean conservation. In 2011, she was named “Woman of the Gulf” by Audubon Society Women in Conservation at the Rachel Carson Awards. She was a recipient of the 2012 Next Award from Mainebiz magazine for her work in shaping the future and the economy of Maine. On Earth Day 2019, Shaw was named one of the "Top Eco-Warrior Women in the World" by Make it Better magazine.

== Personal life ==
Shaw met artist Cynthia Stroud, her future wife, in 1980 in New York City. They moved to Brooklin, Maine, where they lived for several decades. They played pétanque competitively, including a second-place finish at the 2012 Federation Petanque USA Women's World Qualifier. They moved back to New York City, where Shaw died on January 27, 2022, at the age of 78.
