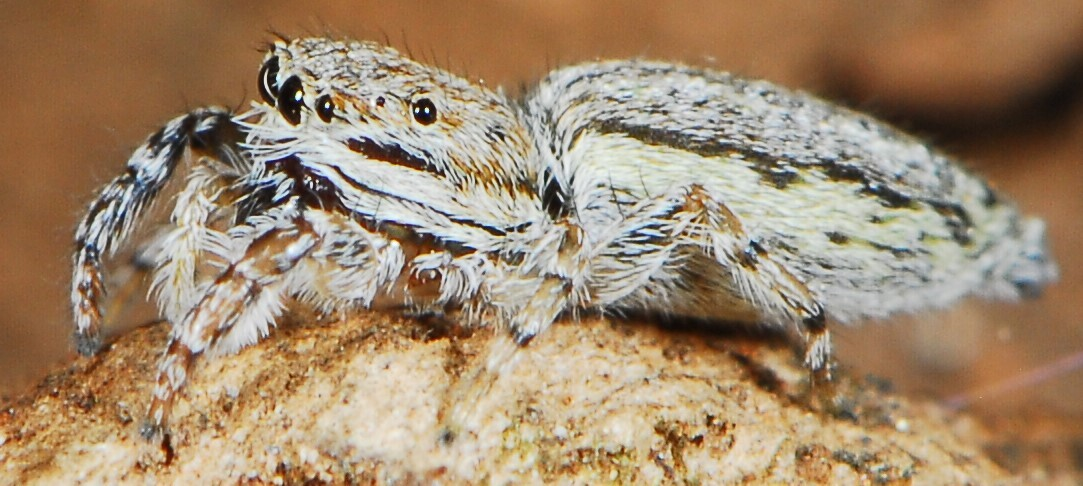
- View from the side of a mature female from uMhlanga, South Africa
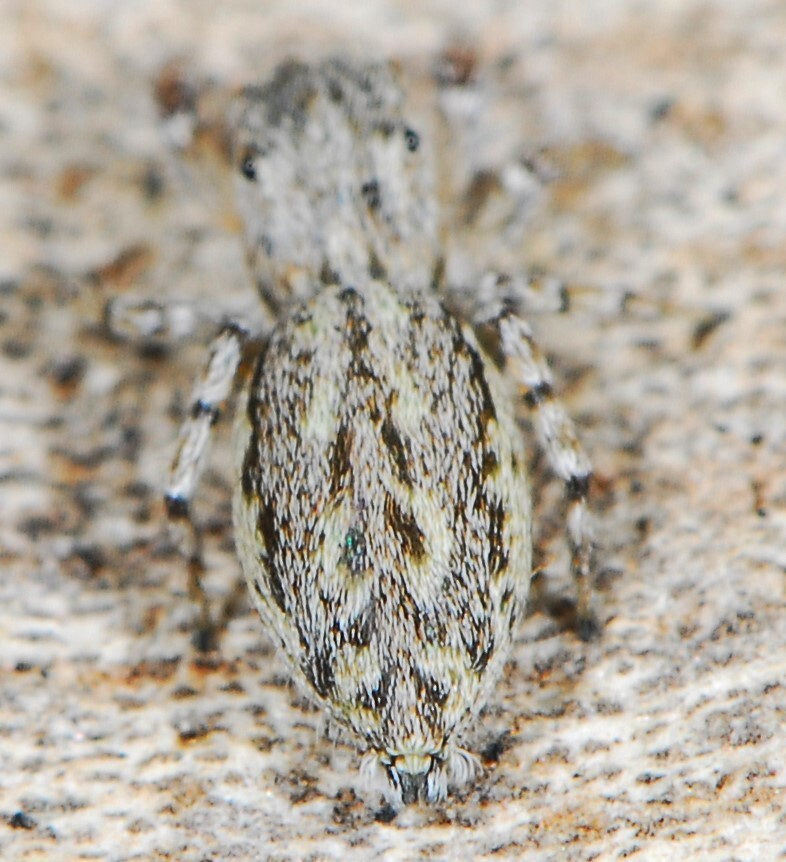
- The same female viewed from above

Conservation status
- Least Concern (IUCN 3.1)

Scientific classification
- Kingdom: Animalia
- Phylum: Arthropoda
- Subphylum: Chelicerata
- Class: Arachnida
- Order: Araneae
- Infraorder: Araneomorphae
- Family: Salticidae
- Genus: Psenuc
- Species: P. dependens

Binomial name
- Psenuc dependens (Haddad &Wesołowska, 2011)

Synonyms
- Pseudicius dependens Haddad & Wesołowska, 2011

= Psenuc dependens =

Species of jumping spider

Psenuc dependens, the Common Psenuc Jumping Spider, is a species of jumping spider that is endemic to South Africa. Originally called Pseudicius dependens, the spider was first described in 2011 by Charles R. Haddad and Wanda Wesołowska. Now a member of the genus Psenuc, it has been found living close to humans, in farms and orchards. It is a small spider, the male being between 4.1 and 4.3 mm (0.16 and 0.17 in) long and the female slightly smaller. It has a flattened slender body with a brown carapace, the hard upper part of the front section of its body, that has a black eye field. Behind its carapace is an ovoid abdomen that is either greyish-brown or brownish-grey but marked with a distinctive pattern that differs between the sexes. The female has a pattern of patches and chevrons; the male has patches and spots. The male has a cymbium, part of its copulatory organs, that has a distinctive shape with a bulge at the end of its curved tip. This feature is the source of its specific name, which is a Latin word meaning 'hanging down'. The female has large, spherical accessory glands.

== Taxonomy and etymology ==
Psenuc dependens is a species of jumping spider, a member of the family Salticidae, that was first described by the arachnologists Charles R. Haddad and Wanda Wesołowska in 2011. It is one of 15 new species discovered by the researchers at the time as part of a study of spiders that live in the grasslands of South Africa. The study looked into whether jumping spiders could be seen as a possible sentinel species for environmental and conservation crises given that only 2.8 percent of grassland in the country is preserved. They initially allocated the species to the genus Pseudicius, which had been first circumscribed by Eugène Simon in 1885, with the name Pseudicius dependens. It is one of over 500 different species of jumping spider described by Wesołowska during her career.

The genus Pseudicius had been provisionally placed alongside Icius based on morphological similarities. As they are superficially similar, Ekaterina Andreeva, Stefania Hęciak and Jerzy Prószyński looked to combine the genera in 1984. Although the two genera have similar copulatory organs, work by Wayne Maddison in 1987 demonstrated that they have very different DNA. They were kept separate, but recognised as related. The two genera were placed in the tribe Heliophaninae alongside Afraflacilla and Marchena.The tribe is ubiquitous across most continents of the world. Maddison renamed the tribe Chrysillini in 2015.

A year later, in 2016, Jerzy Prószyński moved the species to a new genus called Psenuc. He allocated the genus to the Pseudiciines group of genera. They can be identified by their flattened and elongated body and characteristic patterns. The tribe is a member of the clade Saltafresia within the subfamily Salticoida. The spider's generic name is a combination of the names of two words, 'Pseudicius', after the genus, and 'nuclearis'. Its specific name is a Latin word meaning 'hanging down', which refers to th shape of the male's cymbium, a part of its copulatory organs that hangs down like a pendant. The spider is also known as the Common Psenuc Jumping Spider. The holotype is stored in the National Museum, Bloemfontein.

== Description ==
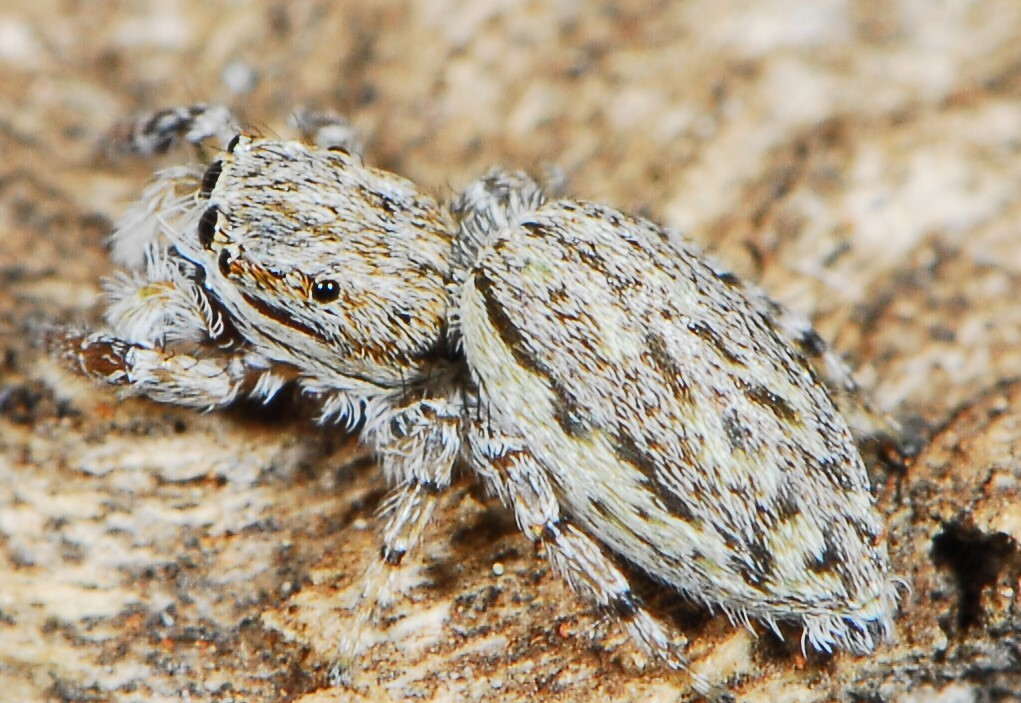
A mature female

Pseudicius dependens is a small spider that has a flattened slender body. The male's flat, oval and dark brown carapace, the hard upper part of the front section of its body, is typically 2 mm (0.08 in) long and between 1.4 and 1.6 mm (0.06 and 0.06 in) wide. Its eye field is black and has a covering of dense greyish hairs. There are long brown bristles near its eyes and a circle of small fawn scales around its foremost eyes. Behind this is a thin line running down the middle of the spider's body and a stripe made up of white hairs on the edge of the carapace. The part of the underside of the carapace known as the sternum is brown. Its face, or clypeus, is low and has a covering of white hairs. Its mouthparts are also brown.

Behind its carapace, the male has an ovoid abdomen that is between 2.1 and 2.3 mm (0.08 and 0.09 in) long and between 1.2 and 1.4 mm (0.05 and 0.06 in) wide. Its topside is dark greyish-brown and is decorated with a pattern of ten patches in pairs in lines down the edges and eight smaller spots in pairs running down the middle. Its underside is pale. The spider has grey spinnerets that it uses to spin webs. Its first pair of legs are long and robust with a single spine on their tibia. Its other legs are yellow with hints of brown. They have brown leg hairs and spines.

|ts pedipalps, sensor organs near its mouth, are brown and hairy. At the end of a pedipalp is the spider's copulatory organs. The male can be identified by its narrow embolus and its lack of a serrated palpal bulb that is often seen on spider's of the genus. The spider's palpal tibia is relatively small with a large jagged projection, or tibial apophysis. At the end of the tibia is a uniquely-shaped rounded cymbium, which has a curved tip that ends in a distinctive bulge. Attached to the cambium, the spider has a small lumpy tegulum that hangs down and overlaps with its palpal tibia. A long embolus starts at the base of this tegulum and follows the outside of the cymbium to finish in a whip-like end.

The female is similar to the male. Its carapace, which measures between 1.8 and 1.9 mm (0.07 and 0.07 in) in width and between 1.3 and 1.5 mm (0.05 and 0.06 in) in width, is similar in shape to the male but smaller. It is generally brown and covered in a dense coat of whitish-grey hairs. Its eye field is black with brown bristles near its eyes. Its sternum is brown. It mouthparts, including its chelicerae, labium and maxillae, are also brown but have whitish tips.

The female's abdomen is between 2.5 and 2.9 mm (0.10 and 0.11 in) in width and typically 1.5 mm (0.06 in) in width. It is dark brownish-grey on top with a pattern that consists of three diagonal patches on its edges, three more irregular patches in the middle and two chevrons to the rear. The pattern is lighter than the rest of the abdomen but hard to see. The underside of its abdomen is pale like the male's. Its legs are yellow with brown rings. The female's epigyne, the visible external part of its copulatory organs, is wider than it is long and has a large shallow depression in the middle. In some cases, this is plugged with a waxy secretion. Towards the rear of its epigyne are two relatively large copulatory openings that lead to narrow seminal ducts that show slight signs of sclerotization, with hardened elements made of sclerotin. The spider's accessory glands are large and spherical.

The species is similar to Pseudicius dentatus, but can be distinguished by its copulatory organs. The female has no pockets on its epigyne, which the other species has, and no gonopores in its epigastric furrow.

== Distribution and habitat ==
Pseudicius spiders can be found across Afro-Eurasia and the Eastern hemisphere. Psenuc dependens is endemic to South Africa. It was first collected by canopy fogging in an orchard of pistachio trees near Prieska in 2001. Early examples were seen in Northern Cape and Free State. It has also been found in Limpopo and Western Cape Provinces. It lives on trees in areas of human habitation, including farms. One specimen was collected from leaf litter under an ancient olive tree in the Free State National Botanical Garden. Others have been seen on the bark of Celtis africana and living in woods. As it has a wide distribution across South Africa, its conservation status is considered of least concern.
