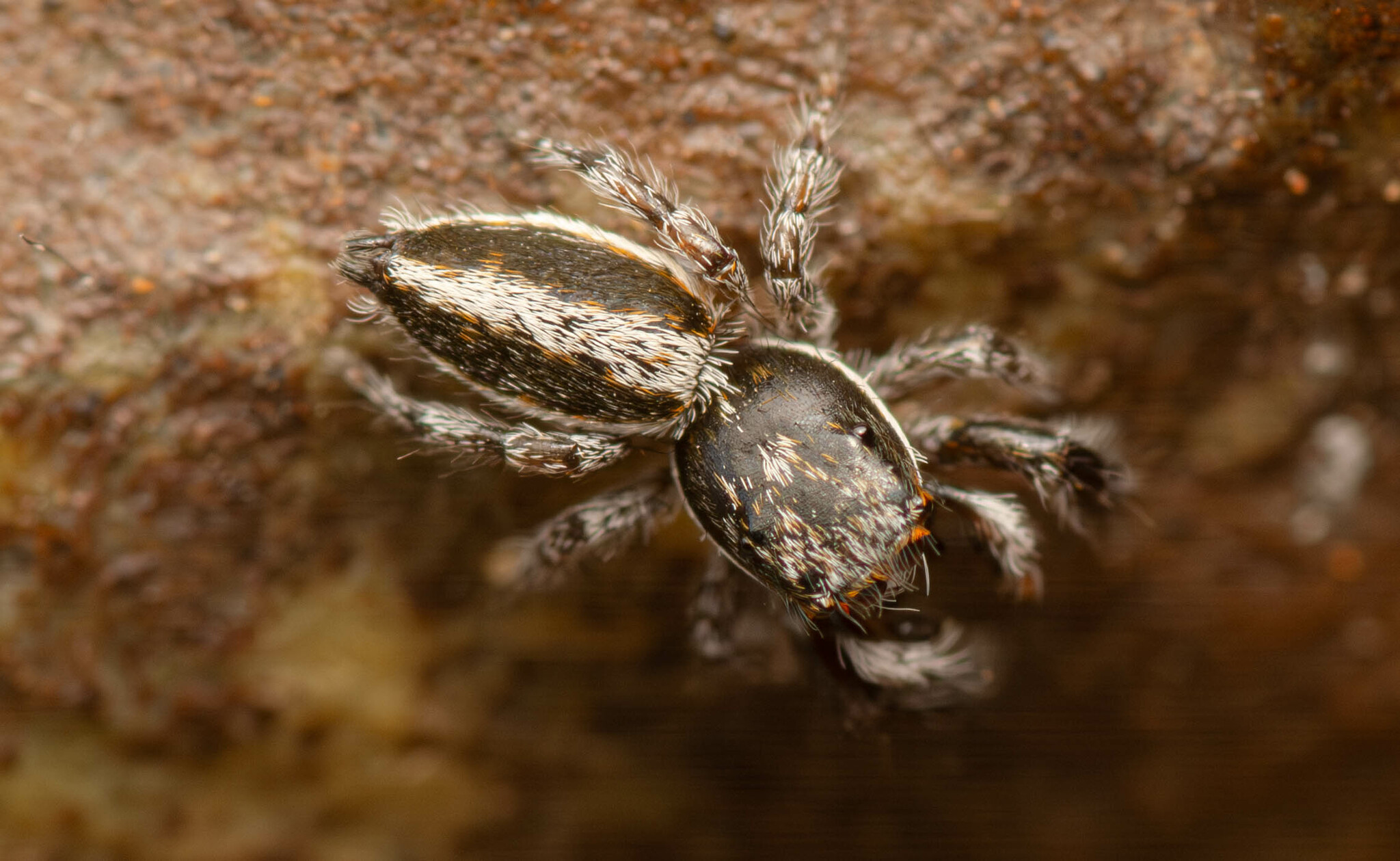
- male
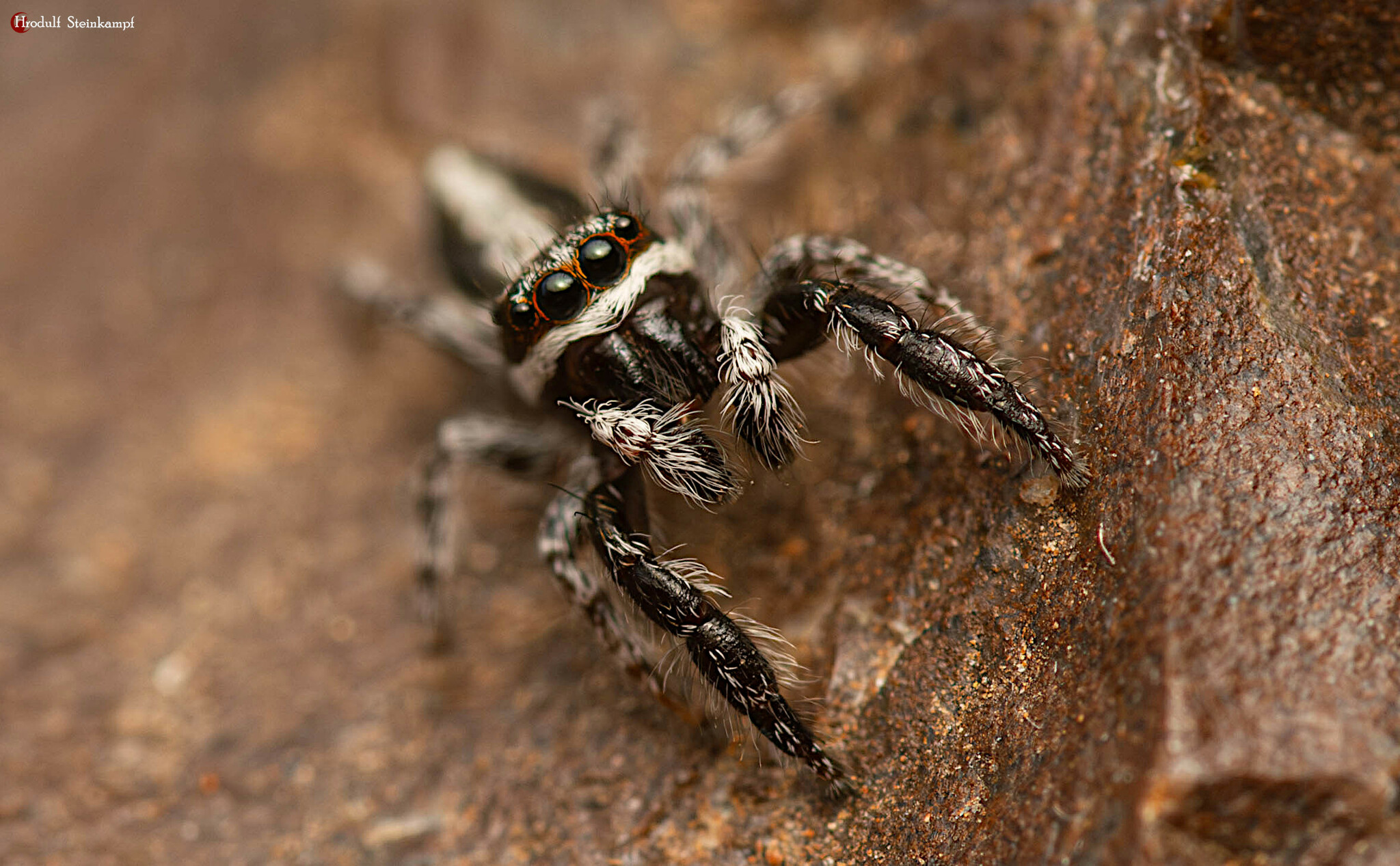
- male

Conservation status
- Least Concern (IUCN 3.1)

Scientific classification
- Kingdom: Animalia
- Phylum: Arthropoda
- Subphylum: Chelicerata
- Class: Arachnida
- Order: Araneae
- Infraorder: Araneomorphae
- Family: Salticidae
- Genus: Pseudicius
- Species: P. dentatus

Binomial name
- Pseudicius dentatus Wesołowska & Haddad, 2013

= Pseudicius dentatus =

Species of spider

Pseudicius dentatus or the Opathe Pseudicius Jumping Spider is a species of jumping spider in the genus Pseudicius that is endemic to South Africa. The spider was first defined in 2013 by Wanda Wesołowska and Charles Haddad. The spider is small, with an oval carapace between 1.7 and 2.0 mm (0.07 and 0.08 in) long and an abdomen between 1.7 and 2.9 mm (0.07 and 0.11 in) long. The female is larger than the male. The abdomen has a pattern of white spots in pairs, the female having clearer and larger spots than the male. The spider has yellow legs, the front pair being longer and more robust. The spider's copulatory organs are distinctive. The female has two pockets lining the sides of the furrow in the epigyne. The male has a broader embolus than the otherwise similar Psenuc dependens. It can also be distinguished by its serrated tibial apophysis that is recalled in its specific name, which can be translated "toothed".

== Taxonomy ==
Pseudicius dentatus is a species of jumping spider, a member of the family Salticidae, that was first described by the Polish arachnologist Wanda Wesołowska and Charles Haddad in 2013. They allocated the species to the genus Pseudicius, first circumscribed by Eugène Simon in 1885. The spider's generic name is related to two Greek words that can be translated false and honest. Its specific name is a Latin word meaning "toothed". The spider is also known as the Opathe Pseudicius Jumping Spider.

The genus Pseudicius had been provisionally placed alongside Icius based on morphological similarities. As they are superficially similar, Ekaterina Andreeva, Stefania Hęciak and Jerzy Prószyński looked to combine the genera in 1984. Although the two genera have similar spermathecal structure, work by Wayne Maddison in 1987 demonstrated that they have very different DNA. Also, despite the names looking similar, they have different etymologies. They were kept separate, but recognised as related. The two genera were placed in the tribe Heliophaninae alongside Afraflacilla and Marchena.The tribe is ubiquitous across most continents of the world. Maddison renamed the tribe Chrysillini in 2015. The tribe is a member of the clade Saltafresia within the subfamily Salticoida. A year later, in 2016, Jerzy Prószyński allocated the genus to the Pseudiciines group of genera, which was named after the genus. Marchena is a member of the group, while Icius is not. They have flattened and elongated body and a characteristic colour pattern.

== Description ==
Pseudicius dentatus is a small spider with a slender body. The male has a carapace that is between 1.7 and 1.8 mm (0.07 and 0.07 in) long and between 1.1 and 1.2 mm (0.04 and 0.05 in) wide. The carapace is oval and chocolate brown with a black marking to the edges and a streak formed of white hairs on its side. The eye field is pitted with a scattering of white hairs visible. It has black rings with long, brown bristles around the eyes themselves. The underside, or sternum, is brown. The spider's face, or clypeus, is very low and covered with white hairs. The chelicerae has a single large tooth to the back, while the remaining mouthparts include a dark brown labium and maxillae. The elongated abdomen is between 1.7 and 2.1 mm (0.07 and 0.08 in) long and between 1.0 and 1.2 mm (0.04 and 0.05 in) wide. It has a pattern of eight white patches in pairs on its greyish brown topside and a greyish underside. The spinnerets are dark and the legs are yellow with brown spines and hairs. The foremost legs are longer and more robust. The pedipalps are brown with a dense covering of long dark hairs. The spider has a long embolus and the tip of the cymbium curves around the small and oval palpal bulb. There is a short protrusion on the palpal tibia called a tibial apophysis. It has a distinctive serrated feature reminiscent of teeth, as reflected in the name.

The female is similar to the male. The carapace is slightly lighter, measuring between 1.7 and 2.0 mm (0.07 and 0.08 in) long and between 1.1 and 1.4 mm (0.04 and 0.06 in) wide. The abdomen has a more distinctive pattern with larger spots on the topside and a covering of grey hairs. It is also larger, between 2.3 and 2.9 mm (0.09 and 0.11 in) long and between 1.3 and 1.5 mm (0.05 and 0.06 in) wide. The legs and other features are similar to the male. The spider has an elongated epigyne with a large deep central depression and two pockets lining the sides of the epigastric furrow. The copulatory openings, placed at the back of the epigyne, lead to wide insemination ducts to u-shaped receptacles, or spermathecae. The accessory glands are very large.

The species is similar to Psenuc dependens, but can be distinguished by its copulatory organs. The male can be identified by its broader embolus and its serrated palpal bulb. The female has pockets on its epigyne, which the other species lacks, and gonopores in its epigastric furrow.

== Distribution ==
Pseudicius spiders can be found across Afro-Eurasia and the Eastern hemisphere. Pseudicius dentatus is endemic to South Africa. The holotype was found in the Ophathe Nature Reserve in KwaZulu-Natal during 2008. Other examples have been found in the Kruger National Park and Ndumo Game Reserve.
