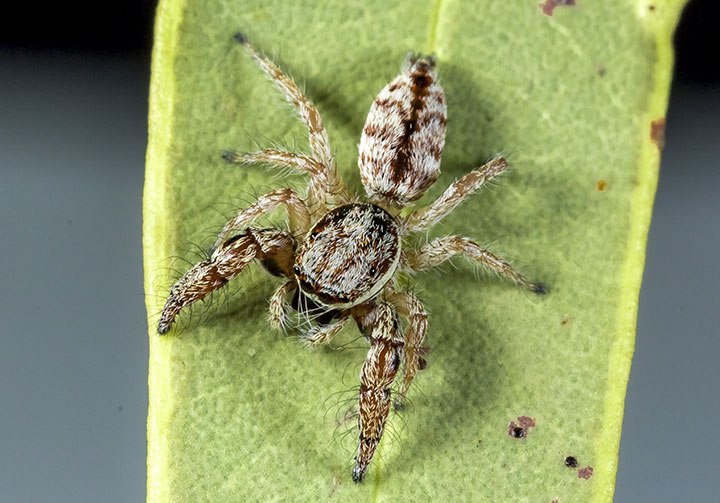
- The related Afraflacilla grayorum

Scientific classification
- Kingdom: Animalia
- Phylum: Arthropoda
- Subphylum: Chelicerata
- Class: Arachnida
- Order: Araneae
- Infraorder: Araneomorphae
- Family: Salticidae
- Genus: Afraflacilla
- Species: A. zuluensis

Binomial name
- Afraflacilla zuluensis (Haddad & Wesołowska 2013)

Synonyms
- Pseudicius zuluensis Haddad & Wesołowska, 2013

= Afraflacilla zuluensis =

Zululand Afraflacilla jumping spider

Species of spider

Afraflacilla zuluensis is a species of jumping spider in the genus Afraflacilla that lives in South Africa. The spider was first described in 2013 by Charles Haddad and Wanda Wesołowska. Originally allocated to the genus Pseudicius, it was moved to its current name by Jerzy Prószyński in 2016. It is hard to distinguish from others in the genus, particularly the related Afraflacilla karinae. The female is also hard to distinguish from Pseudicius gracilis. The spider is small, with a cephalothorax that is between 1.8 and 1.9 long and an abdomen between 2.0 and 2.2 mm long. It has a dark brown carapace with a black eye field. The female has a pattern of white lines on its abdomen, which is otherwise brown on top and yellowish underneath. The male makes sounds by rubbing short hairs on its front legs with its carapace. The male's front leg is also larger than the other legs, which are also generally more yellowish. It lives in the canopy of trees of the Vachellia genus in the mountains of Zululand, KwaZulu-Natal, after which it is named.

== Taxonomy ==
Afraflacilla zuluensis is a jumping spider that was first described by Charles Haddad and Wanda Wesołowska in 2013. It is one of over 500 species identified by Wesołowska during her career, leading her to be one of the most prolific scientists in the field. They originally allocated the species to the genus Pseudicius. First circumscribed by Eugène Simon in 1885, the genus is named after two Greek words that can be translated false and honest. The genus is a member of the tribe Heliophaninae, which is ubiquitous across most continents of the world. Wayne Maddison renamed the tribe Chrysillini in 2015. The tribe is a member of the clade Saltafresia within the subfamily Salticoida.

A year later, in 2016, Jerzy Prószyński moved the species to the genus Afraflacilla on the basis of the shape of the copulatory organs. It was one of more than 40 species that were transferred between the two genera at the time. Afraflacilla had been circumscribed by Lucien Betland and Jacques Millot in 1941. It is also a member of the tribe Chrysillini. Prószyński allocated the genus to the Pseudiciines group of genera in 2017, which was named after the genus Pseudicius. They can be distinguished from other jumping spiders by their flattened and elongated body and characteristic colour patterns. The species is named after Zululand, the region of KwaZulu-Natal where the spider was first found.

== Description ==
Afraflacilla zuluensis is a small spider with an elongated body. The spider's body is divided into two main parts: the cephalothorax and the abdomen. The male has a cephalothorax that is typically 1.9 mm (0.07 in) long and 1.2 mm (0.05 in) wide. Its carapace is a dark brown flattened oval, covered in thin colourless hairs. The eye field is black and pitted with a few long bristles and whitish scales around the eyes themselves. The underside of the carapace, or sternum, is also dark brown. The spider has dark brown mouthparts, including its chelicerae, labium and maxilae. The spider's abdomen is typically 2.0 mm (0.08 in) long and 1.3 mm (0.05 in) wide. It is a brown ovoid with a pattern of white hairs on the top contrasting with the underside, which is yellowish. The sides of the abdomen are dark with light streaks. It has dark spinnerets. The legs are generally yellowish-brown, apart from the first pair. These are larger, brown with a sharp spine on the front of a swollen tibia. It has stridulatory apparatus for producing sound, by rubbing a row of short stiff hairs on the front of the carapace and a few similar bristles on its front femora.

The male spider has distinctive copulatory organs. The pedipalps are brown with a tibia that has two projections, or apophyses. The larger one has a pronounced curve and a small spike on the end. The other is significantly shorter and has a secondary bump near the base. The palpal bulb is rounded and bulbous, with a particularly pronounced lump to the base. It has a long thin embolus that runs out from the side, around the top and then beyond, pointing away at an angle.

The female is very similar to the male. The cephalothorax is typically 1.8 mm (0.07 in) long and 1.2 mm (0.05 in) wide and the abdomen 2.2 mm (0.09 in) long and 14 mm (0.55 in) wide. The carapace is generally similar as are the mouthparts. The abdomen looks different as it has a brownish topside that has a light light that stretches down the middle crossed by three thin streaks. Unlike in the male, the front pair of legs are similar to the others. The spider has an oval epigyne that is wider than it is long and has two pockets and two round depressions to the front. The copulatory openings lead to long twisted insemination ducts that follow a complex route to narrow spermathecae. The large accessory glands fall into the ducts.

The species is similar to others in the genus, many of which were also previously allocated to the genus Pseudicius. It is the copulatory organs that enable them to be separated. For example, while the spider is externally very similar to the related Afraflacilla karinae, the male differs in the shape of the tibial apophysis. It is also very hard to distinguish from species currently in the genus Pseudicius. The female is particularly striking as it is almost identical to Pseudicius gracilis.

== Behaviour ==
Jumping spiders rarely use webs and instead use their good eyesight to hunt prey. The related Afraflacilla venustula is known to be particularly active in the early and mid-morning, and mid-afternoon. They create silk cocoons, in which the males are often co-habit with subadult females. Female spiders are known to stay with the egg sacs until the babies emerged from their eggs. The spiders use visual displays during courtship and transmit vibratory signals through silk to communicate to other spiders.

== Distribution and habitat ==
Afraflacilla zuluensis is endemic to South Africa. The holotype was found in the Vryheid Mountain Provincial Nature Reserve near Vryheid in KwaZulu-Natal in 2012 at an altitude of 1,225 m (4,019 ft) above sea level. Other examples were also found in the local area. It is limited to that province. The species thrives in Afromontane areas. Like other members of the genus, the species lives in the fogging canopy of Vachellia trees in grassland habitats. The holotype was found in the canopy of Vachellia tortilis trees.
