= Psenuc solitarius =

Scientific classification
- Kingdom: Animalia
- Phylum: Arthropoda
- Subphylum: Chelicerata
- Class: Arachnida
- Order: Araneae
- Infraorder: Araneomorphae
- Family: Salticidae
- Genus: Psenuc
- Species: P. solitarius

Binomial name
- Psenuc solitarius (Haddad & Wesołowska, 2011)

Species of jumping spider

Psenuc solitarius is a species of jumping spider that is found in Namibia and South Africa. A member of the genus Psenuc, the spider was originally called Pseudicius solitarius. The female spider was first described in 2011 by Wanda Wesołowska and Charles Haddad; the male has not been described, which is recalled in its specific name, the Latin word for 'alone'. The spider is between 4.3 and 6.2 mm (0.17 and 0.24 in) in total length, South African examples being longer than those from Namibia. It has a generally brown and flattened body with a pattern on the top of its abdomen. South African spiders have a faint pattern of three diagonal stripes and Namibia spiders have a symmetrical pattern of light patches. The spider is distinguished from others in the genus by the internal design of its copulatory organs, particularly the length of seminal ducts and the size of its spermathecae, or receptacles.

== Taxonomy and etymology ==
Psenuc solitarius is a species of jumping spider, a member of the family Salticidae, that was first described by the arachnologists Charles Haddad and Wanda Wesołowska in 2011. They initially allocated the species to the genus Pseudicius, first circumscribed by Eugène Simon in 1885, with the name Pseudicius solitarius. The genus Pseudicius had been provisionally placed alongside Icius based on morphological similarities. As they are superficially similar, Ekaterina Andreeva, Stefania Hęciak and Jerzy Prószyński looked to combine the genera in 1984. Although the two genera have similar spermathecal structure, work by Wayne Maddison in 1987 demonstrated that they have very different DNA. They were kept separate, but recognised as related. The two genera were placed in the tribe Heliophaninae alongside Afraflacilla and Marchena.The tribe is ubiquitous across most continents of the world. Maddison renamed the tribe Chrysillini in 2015.

A year later, in 2016, Jerzy Prószyński moved the species to a new genus called Psenuc. He allocated the genus to the Pseudiciines group of genera. They can be identified by their flattened and elongated body and characteristic patterns. The tribe is a member of the clade Saltafresia within the subfamily Salticoida.

The spider's generic name is a combination of the names of two words, 'Pseudicius', after the genus, and 'nuclearis'. Its specific name is a Latin word meaning 'alone' and relates to the fact that only the female has been described. The holotype is stored in the National Museum, Bloemfontein.

== Description ==
Pseudicius solitarius is a small spider that has a flattened slender body that is typical for the genus. The female spider has a hard upper part of the front section of its body, known as a carapace, that is flat, oval, flattened, brown, and between 1.9 and 2 mm (0.07 and 0.08 in) long and between 1.2 and 1.4 mm (0.05 and 0.06 in) wide. It is generally covered in of dense whitish hairs. A row of stiff bristles on the side of the spider's carapace are used for producing sound by stridulation. There are long brown bristles near its eyes which are surrounded by either a black eye field or black rings. There is a circle of white scales around its foremost eyes. The part of the underside of the carapace known as its sternum is brown as are its jaws, or Chelicerae. Its remaining mouthparts, including its, labium and maxillae, are also brown but have whitish tips.

Behind its carapace, the male has an ovoid abdomen that is between 2.4 and 4.2 mm (0.09 and 0.17 in) long and 1.3 and 2 mm (0.05 and 0.08 in) wide. South African specimen are longer than those found in Namibia. Its topside is greyish-beige. South African specimen are decorated with a faint pattern of three diagonal stripes and a scattering of brown bristles on top and have a beige underside with a pattern of two paler stripes. Namibian specimen have a symmetrical pattern of light patches. The spider has brown spinnerets. Its first pair of legs are brown with a single spine on their tibia. Its other legs are yellow with brown rings on the back pairs.

The female's epigyne, the visible external part of its copulatory organs, is oval with gonopores to the rear. There are two openings that are situated also near the rear far to the left and right. These lead to seminal ducts that follow a complex pattern of loops before terminating in relatively large spermathecae, or receptacles. The spider's accessory glands are large and spherical. It is these longer ducts and larger spemathecae that distinguish the species from the related Pseudicius adustus.

The male has not been described. Haddad and Wesołowska did consider whether Afraflacilla karinae, the male of which was first described at the same time with the name Pseudicius karinae, is the same species. However, the difference between this species and its relatives and the large relatively small range of the various species dissuaded them.

== Distribution and habitat ==
Pseudicius spiders can be found across Afro-Eurasia and the Eastern hemisphere. Psenuc solitarius has been found in Namibia and South Africa. The first examples were seen in Free State living in vegetation.
