= Shaw Institute =

- Formation: 1990
- Founder: Susan Shaw
- Purpose: Environmental research
- Location: Blue Hill, Maine, U.S.
- Website: www.shawinstitute.org
- Formerly called: Marine & Environmental Research Institute

The Shaw Institute, formerly the Marine & Environmental Research Institute, is a 501(c)(3) nonprofit scientific research organization based in Blue Hill, Maine and New York City. The institute conducts research into ocean pollution, flame retardants, microplastics and plastic pollution, sentinel species and climate change.

== Background ==
The Shaw Institute was established as the Marine & Environmental Research Institute in 1990 by environmental health scientist, marine toxicologist, explorer, and author Susan Shaw. The institute was renamed in 2018 to accommodate the organization's global research profile with emphasis on improving human health and to reflect the 30-legacy of its founder, who is credited as the first scientist to show that brominated flame retardant chemicals used in consumer products have contaminated marine mammals and commercially important fish stocks in the northwest Atlantic Ocean.

== Background ==
Founded in 1990 by Susan Shaw (as the Marine & Environmental Research Institute), the Shaw Institute was established to research and expose environmental health threats through innovative science and engage in strategic partnerships to improve human and ecological health. Shaw is globally recognized for pioneering high-impact environmental research on ocean pollution, climate change, oil spills, and plastics that has fueled public policy over three decades. In 1983, with landscape photographer Ansel Adams, she published Overexposure, the first book to document the health hazards of photographic chemicals. Shaw is credited as the first scientist to show that brominated flame retardant chemicals used in consumer products have contaminated marine mammals and commercially important fish stocks in the northwest Atlantic Ocean. She became the first scientist to dive into the Gulf of Mexico oil slick following the 2010 BP Deepwater Horizon oil rig explosion to investigate the impacts of chemical dispersants used in response to the spill.

As of 2019, the institute conducts research into ocean pollution, plastics and microplastics, chemical health threats, and climate change in the Gulf of Maine and raises awareness of the toxic legacy of man-made chemicals on human health and marine environments. The institute is a 501(c)(3) nonprofit scientific research organization funded primarily by grants and charitable contributions.

== Milestones ==
In 1990, Shaw established the Marine & Environmental Research Institute (MERI) and began long-term marine sentinels research on contaminants and endocrine-disrupting effects in marine mammals that became the Institute's central focus over the next two decades. In 2000, the Institute hosted its first international conference: The Atlantic Coast Contaminant Workshop ACCW 2000, Endocrine Disruptors in the Marine Environment: Impacts on Marine Wildlife and Human Health, uniting international wildlife and human health scientists. Shortly thereafter, the Institute launched a coastal monitoring program, a lecture series, and education programs.

In 2000, Shaw Institute began long-term research focused on marine sentinel species to characterize the extent of contamination of the northwest Atlantic marine ecosystem from Maine to New York, funded by the National Oceanic and Atmospheric Administration (NOAA). This work has shown that levels of toxic chemicals, such as polychlorinated biphenyls (PCBs), in northwest Atlantic harbor seals are among the highest in the world.

In 2002, the Institute convened the Gulf of Maine Forum: Protecting Our Coastal and Offshore Waters in Blue Hill in conjunction with the Gulf of Maine Council on the Marine Environment, representing New England states and Canadian provinces. A year later, the Shaw Institute begins its student internships program for scientific research and monitoring. In 2004, the Ocean Environment Lecture Series is launched, attracting international experts in a variety of fields. That same year, the long-term Blue Hill Bay Monitoring Project, the first bay-wide health assessment of its kind, is established to produce a ten-year baseline dataset on conditions and issues of concern. In 2014, the project expands geographically to include Penobscot Bay and targets research on microplastics, invasive species, and seafood contamination.

In 2012, the Institute pioneered microplastics research in Blue Hill Bay, Maine. Alarming findings about the presence of microplastics in coastal waters prompted concern for human health (via seafood consumption).

In 2013, Shaw was lead investigator of a study that tested a group of firefighters in San Francisco and found that their blood contains high levels of flame retardants and cancer-causing chemicals such as dioxins and furans, produced by the burning of flame-retarded household materials. Based on these findings, in 2014, the Institute announced plans for a long-term study of chemical exposure and cancer risk in U.S. firefighters named the National Fire Fighter Cancer Biomarker Study, funded in part by IAFF and IAB.

Starting in 2017, the Institute began a multi-year project and partnership with researchers from Sweden, Greenland and Iceland to assess the converging impacts of climate change and flame retardant chemicals on marine mammals from the US Atlantic, Baltic, and Arctic seas.

== Plastics Research ==
In 2012, Shaw Institute conducted the first microplastics study of its kind in the Gulf of Maine. Using new collection methods, they detected an average of 17 microplastic fragments per liter in local seawater samples. These high results prompted the institute to monitor input sites including stream and river mouths around Blue Hill Bay.

In 2014, the Institute developed a study to measure microplastics in Maine seafood, which identified surprisingly large numbers of microplastic fragments in oysters and mussels. Shaw Institute also conducted analysis of microplastics in tissues of mussels, fish, and marine mammals. These numbers prompted questions about bioaccumulation in human consumers. In 2014, Shaw Institute testified in support of legislation to ban the use of plastic microbeads in personal care products, which passed unanimously.

In 2018, in partnership with Bigelow Laboratory for Ocean Sciences, Shaw Institute scientists lead a 2018 study on the uptake and expulsion of microplastic fibers by blue mussels (Mytilus edulis) in the Gulf of Maine. In 2019, the Shaw Institute partnered with the international Plastics Health Coalition in order to advance understanding of the damaging effects of microplastics in the human body and to promote plastic reduction on a global scale.
