= Canary Complex =

American music project

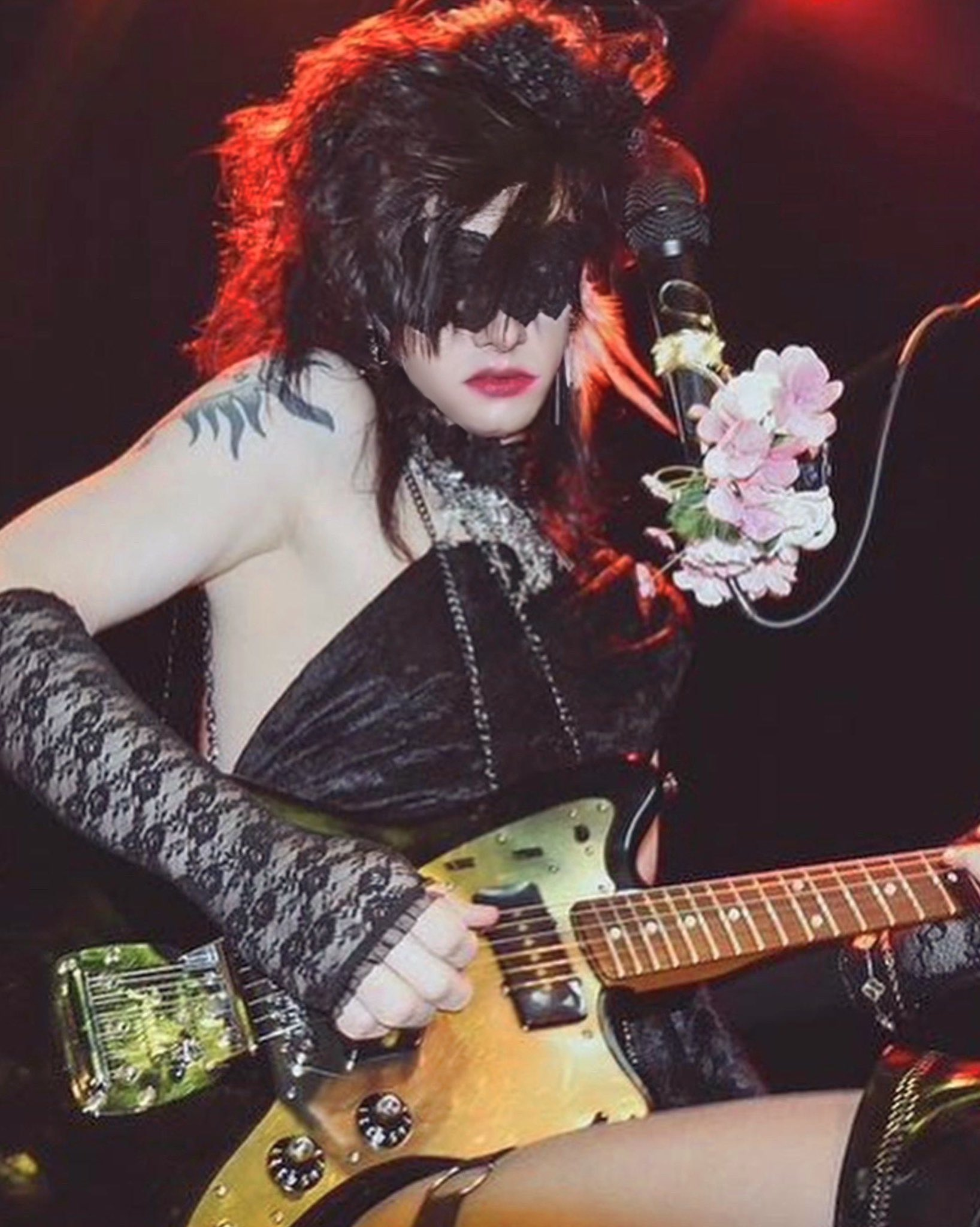
- Canary Kasey performing in 2024

Background information
- Origin: Raleigh, North Carolina, U.S.
- Genres: Progressive rock; alternative rock; chamber pop; indie rock
- Years active: 2021–present
- Members: Canary Kasey
- Website: canarycomplex.com
- Logo

Canary Complex is an American visual kei music project founded by guitarist Canary Kasey in 2021. It is regarded as one of the most notable visual kei acts outside Japan and the most prominent representative of the scene in the United States.

== History ==
Canary Kasey, a member of Flood District, began a solo project under the name Canary Complex in 2021. The project's name is a reference to the historical use of canaries to detect gas in coal mines. On August 28, 2021, Canary Complex released its debut album, titled When I Say Rain... According to Kasey, the album was recorded entirely in his bedroom.

The project's second album, The Tragic Dance of Dying Leaves, was released on March 31, 2023. It was mixed by Michael Rumple, who also played drums on several of the songs featured on the album. Canary Complex's third album, A Whisper of Spring, was released on April 24, 2025. It was preceded by three singles: "Déshabillez-Moi", "Corsets Fall", and "Papillon ~Snow Angel~". The album was co-produced by Michael Rumple.

Kasey on stage with Kamijo at Webster Hall, New York, 2026

On October 23, 2026, Canary Complex released the single "Bel Esprit". Kasey performed with Kamijo in New York City on October 31, 2026.

== Musical style ==
The project's music has been described as progressive rock, alternative rock, chamber pop, and "progressive indie rock".

The sound present on the project's third album, A Whisper of Spring, was described as "blending 90s visual kei, French chanson, and progressive rock", crafting a "romantic, imagined world set in Belle Époque Paris". It also incorporated bossa nova elements.

== Influences and legacy ==
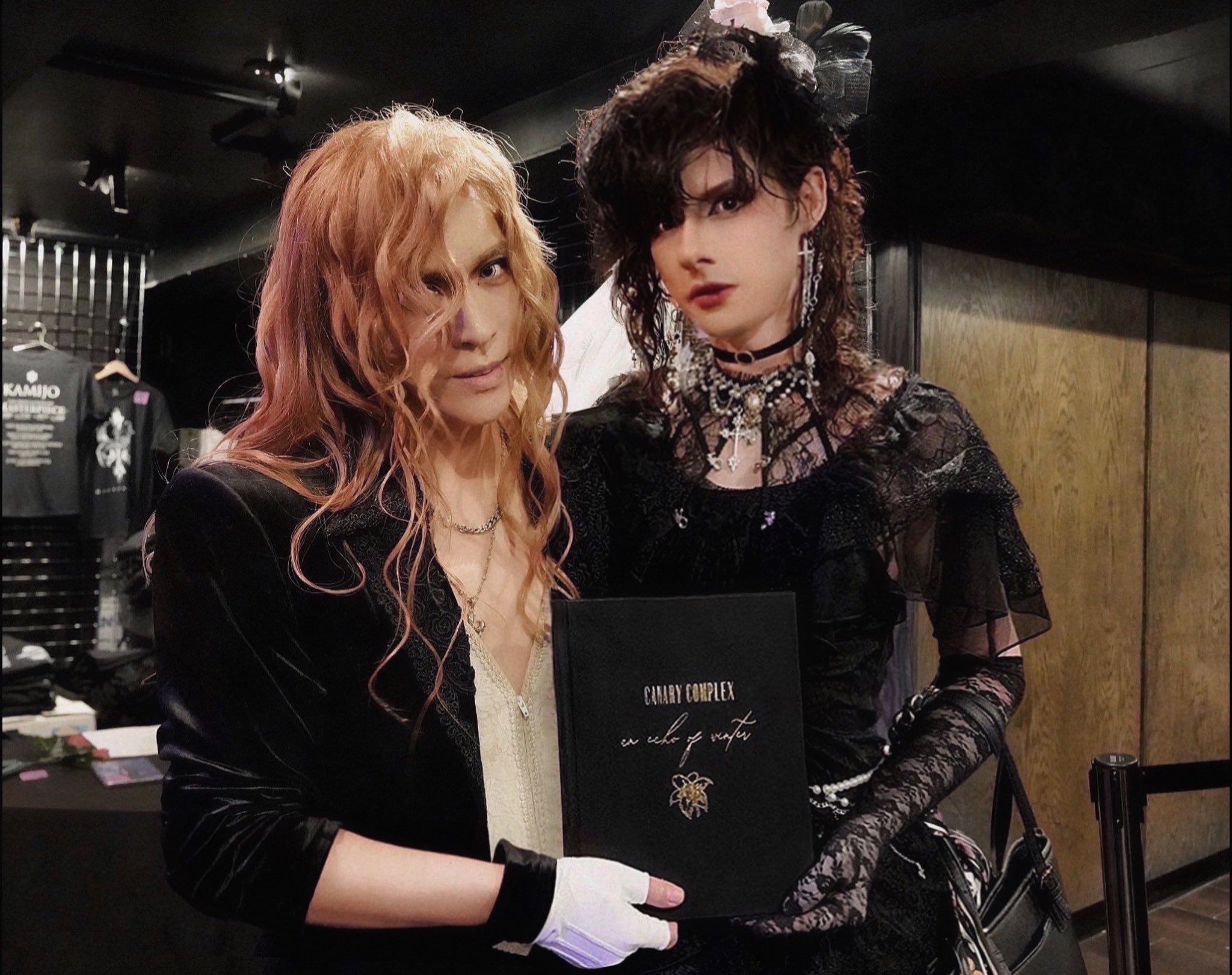
Kasey with Kamijo in 2025

The music of Canary Complex was influenced by Japanese visual kei artists such as Luna Sea, Malice Mizer, Lareine, X Japan, Kuroyume, Buck-Tick, and Shazna. It also drew inspiration from Mylène Farmer, bossa nova, gothic rock, French chanson, baroque pop, and post-punk. As a teenager, Kasey listened to American heavy metal bands like Dokken, Skid Row, and Mötley Crüe. The first visual kei band he encountered was Kagrra,

Canary Complex gained a prominent international following, particularly among Japanese and Chinese fans of visual kei. The project was praised by visual kei fans globally for contributing to the scene's presence outside its country of origin. It has been referred to as "one of the first authentic Western takes on visual kei". Kasey has been described as the first musician to "capture [visual kei's] spirit beyond Japan". The project was complimented by Kamijo. In 2026, Canary Complex was featured in The World Visual Kei Guidebook, a book showcasing visual kei artists from outside Japan.

As a guitarist, Kasey has drawn comparisons to Mana of Malice Mizer and Moi dix Mois, and Hisashi Imai of Buck-Tick.

== Discography ==
Full-length albums

- When I Say Rain... (2021)
- The Tragic Dance of Dying Leaves (2023)
- A Whisper of Spring (2025)

Singles

- "Lucky Charms" (2021)
- "Cloudbusting" (2022)
- "Déshabillez-Moi" (2025)
- "Corsets Fall" (2025)
- "Papillon ~Snow Angel~" (2025)
- "Bel Esprit" (2026)
