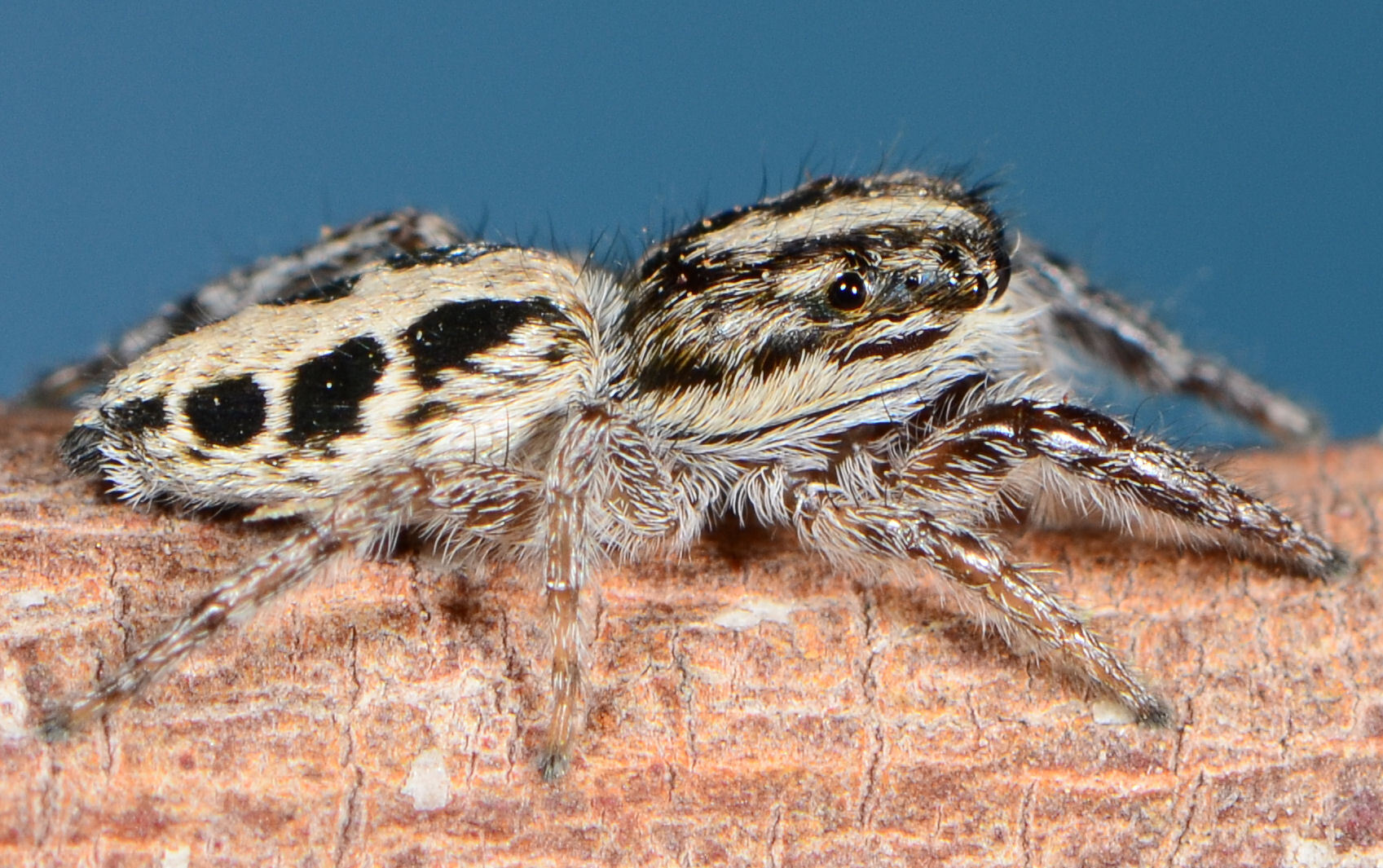
- female
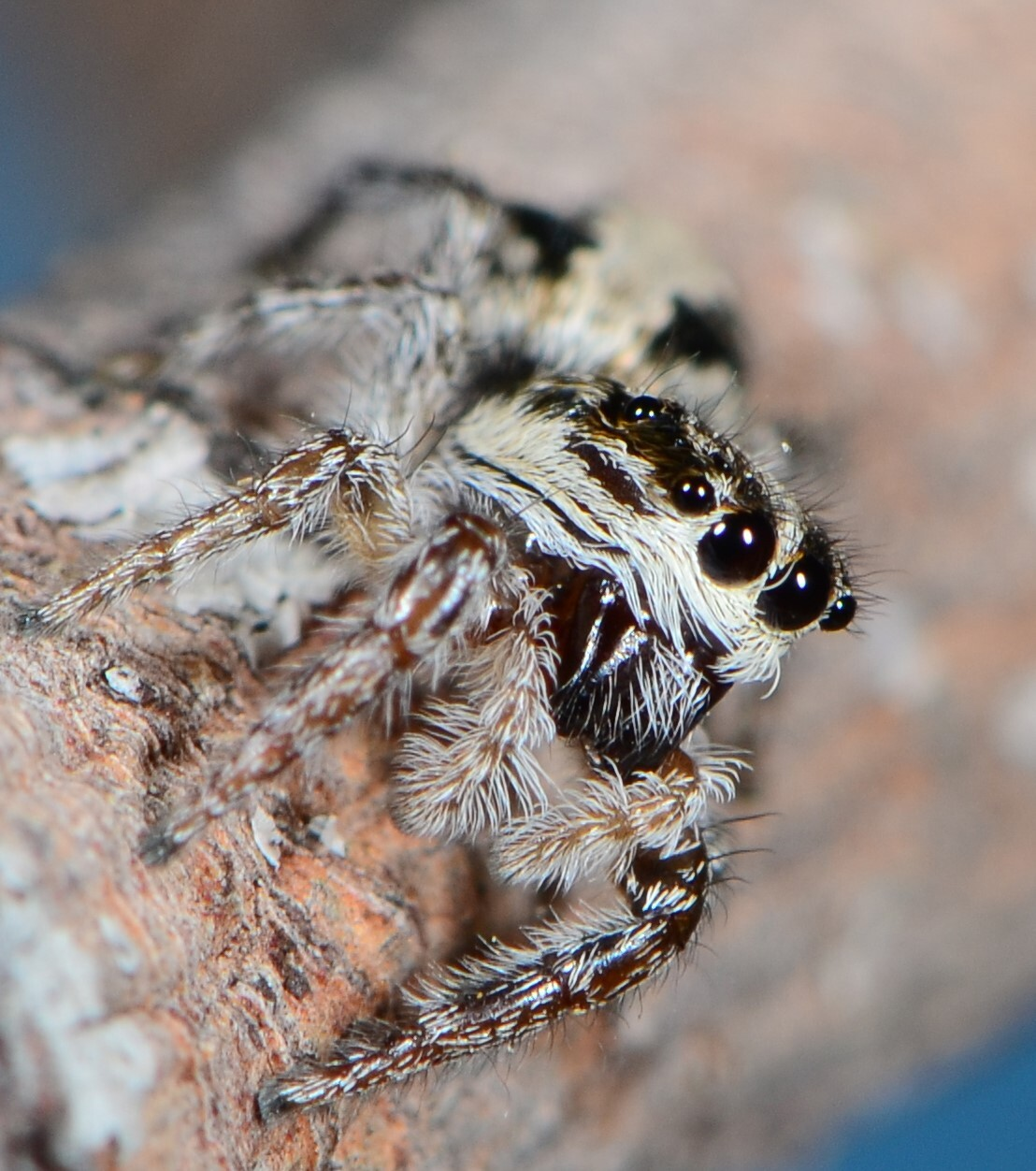
- female

Scientific classification
- Kingdom: Animalia
- Phylum: Arthropoda
- Subphylum: Chelicerata
- Class: Arachnida
- Order: Araneae
- Infraorder: Araneomorphae
- Family: Salticidae
- Genus: Pseudicius
- Species: P. adustus

Binomial name
- Pseudicius adustus Wesołowska, 2006

= Pseudicius adustus =

Species of spider

Pseudicius adustus is a species of jumping spider in the genus Pseudicius that is endemic to Namibia. The spider was first defined in 2016 by Wanda Wesołowska. The spider is small, with an oval carapace typically 1.8 mm (0.07 in) long and an abdomen 2.6 mm (0.10 in) long. The abdomen is elongated like other members of the genus, but with a yellowish with a pattern of eight brown patches. The female has an ovoid epigyne that has a large deep central depression and short wide insemination ducts. The design of the epigyne helps distinguish it from related species, like Pseudicius solitarius, which has larger receptacles and longer insemination ducts. It can also be most identified by the pattern on its abdomen. The male has not been described.

== Taxonomy ==
Pseudicius adustus is a jumping spider that was first described by the Polish arachnologist Wanda Wesołowska in 2006. It was one of more than 500 species that she identified in her career, making her one of the most prolific in the discipline. She allocated the species to the genus Pseudicius, first circumscribed by Eugène Simon in 1885. The genus name is related to two Greek words that can be translated false and honest. The genus was provisionally placed alongside Icius. As they are superficially similar, Ekaterina Andreeva, Stefania Hęciak and Jerzy Prószyński looked to combine the genera in 1984. The two genera have similar spermathecal structure but work by Wayne Maddison in 1987 demonstrated that they have very different DNA. Also, despite the names looking similar, they have different etymologies. They were kept separate, but recognised as related. The two genera were placed in the tribe Heliophaninae alongside Afraflacilla and Marchena.The tribe is ubiquitous across most continents of the world. Maddison renamed the tribe Chrysillini in 2015. The tribe is a member of the clade Saltafresia within the subfamily Salticoida. A year later, in 2016, Jerzy Prószyński allocated Pseudicius to the Pseudiciines group of genera, which was named after the genus. Marchena is a member of the group, but Icius is not. They have flattened and elongated body and a characteristic colour pattern. The species is named for a Latin word meaning partly burnt.

== Description ==
Like all Pseudicius spiders, the species is small. The female has a carapace that is typically 1.8 mm (0.07 in) long and typically 1.3 mm (0.05 in) wide. The carapace is oval, flat, dark brown and covered in greyish hairs. It has a darker eye field with long, brown bristles near the eyes. The spider's face, or clypeus, is very low and covered with white hairs. The spider's mouthparts, its chelicerae and labium, are brown and it has two teeth at the front and one to the back. The underside of the carapace, or sternum, is yellow. The abdomen is typically 2.6 mm (0.10 in) long and typically 1.3 mm (0.05 in) wide. It is elongated and hairy, yellowish with a pattern of eight brown patches in pairs. The underside is yellowish-white. The spinnerets are beige and the legs are pale yellow with brown spines and light hairs. The female has copulatory organs that are typical for the genus. The epigyne is ovoid with a large deep central depression and wide insemination ducts. The species is similar to others in the genus but is most easily identified by the pattern on its abdomen and the shape of the epigyne. The epigyne is similar to the related Pseudicius solitarius but it has smaller receptacles and shorter insemination ducts. The male has not been described.

== Behaviour ==
Pseudicius adustus is typical for the genus. Like many jumping spiders, it is not likely to spin webs to capture prey. Instead, it is mainly a diurnal hunter that uses its good eyesight to spot its prey. Pseudicius spiders frequently live in nest complexes rather than solitarily. They use visual displays during courtship and transmits vibratory signals through silk to communicate to other spiders.

== Distribution ==
Pseudicius spiders can be found across Afro-Eurasia and the Eastern hemisphere. Pseudicius adustus is endemic to Namibia. The holotype was found near Brandberg Mountain in 1991.
