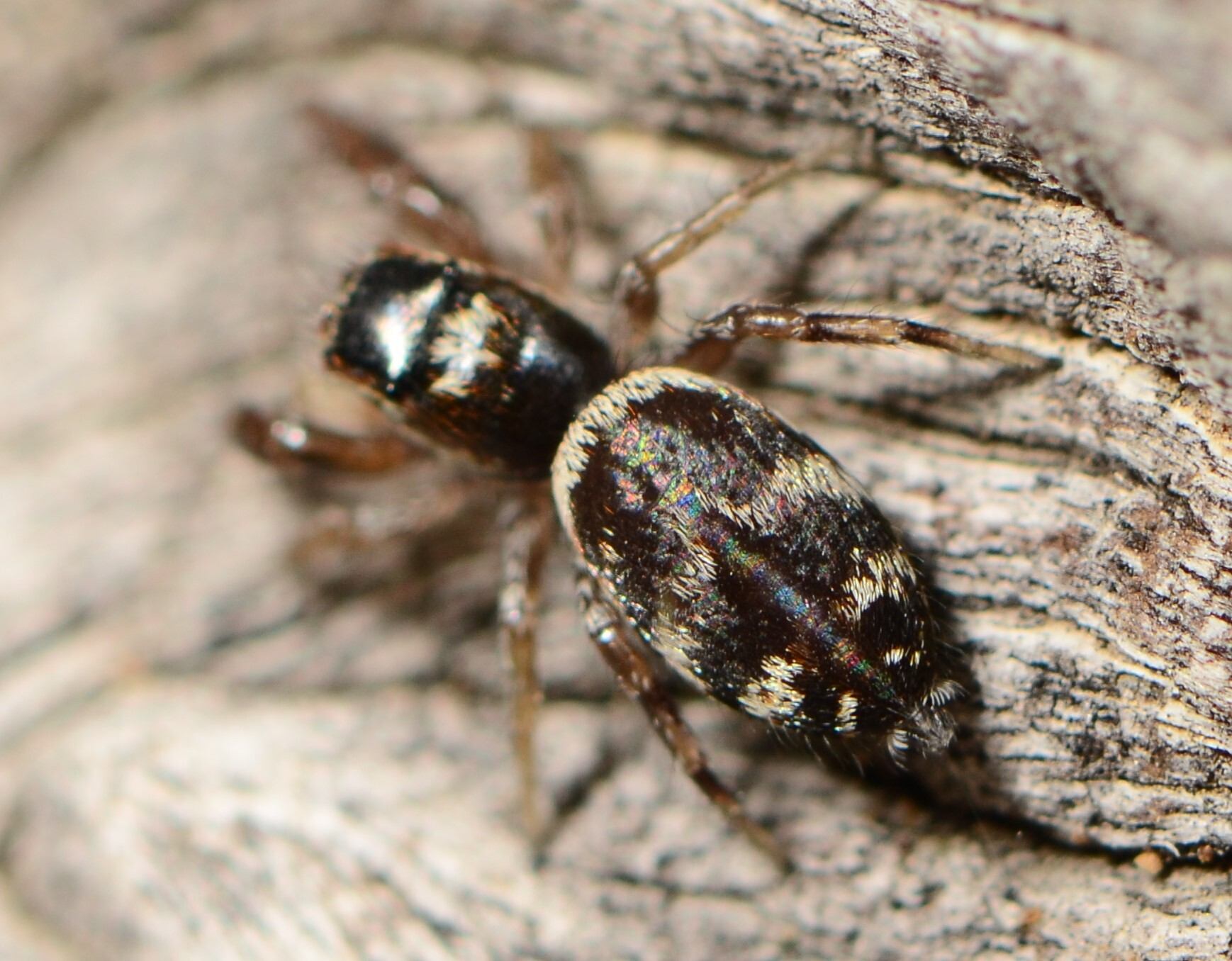
- female
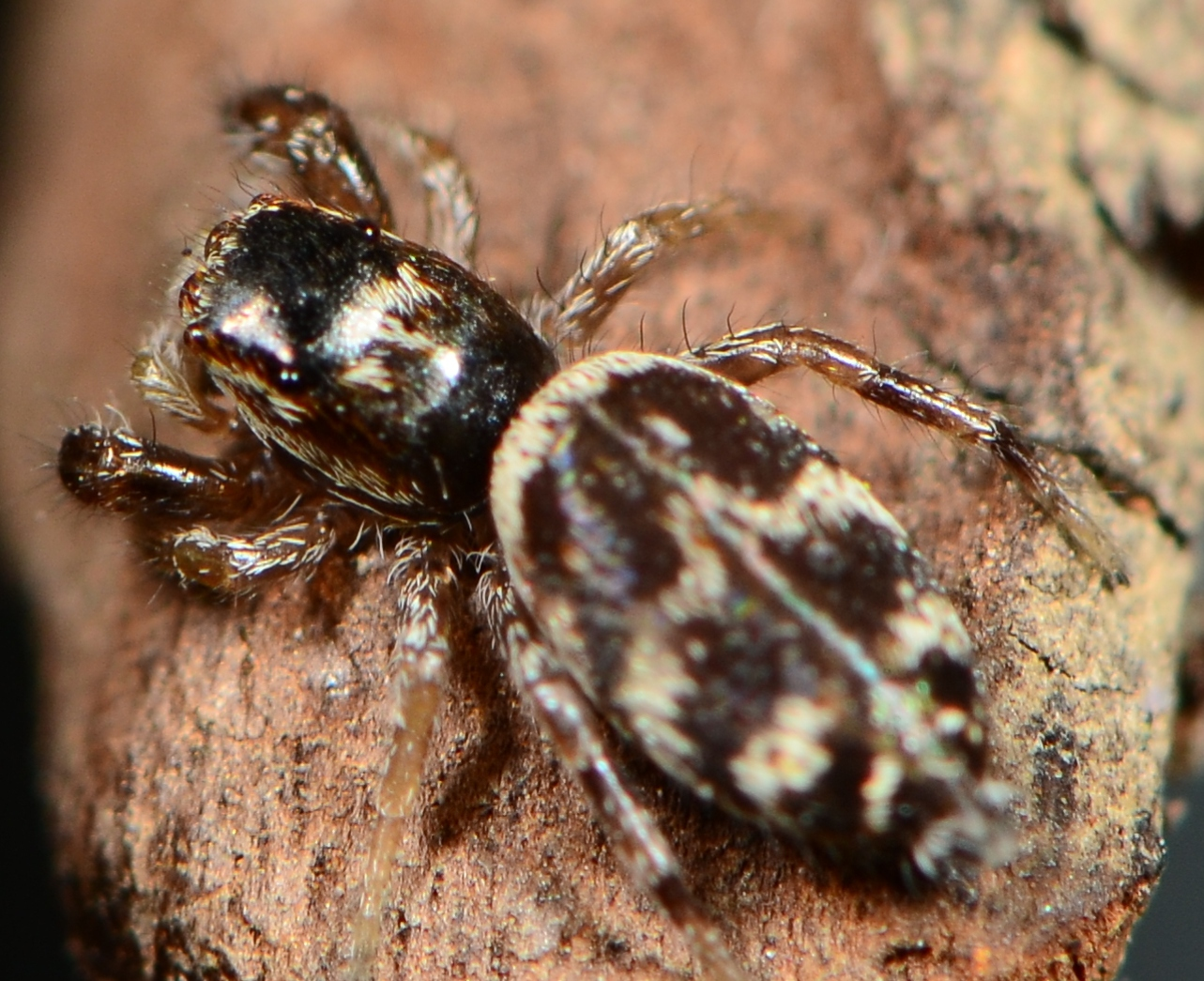
- female

Scientific classification
- Kingdom: Animalia
- Phylum: Arthropoda
- Subphylum: Chelicerata
- Class: Arachnida
- Order: Araneae
- Infraorder: Araneomorphae
- Family: Salticidae
- Genus: Pseudicius
- Species: P. gracilis

Binomial name
- Pseudicius gracilis Haddad & Wesołowska, 2011

= Pseudicius gracilis =

Species of spider

Pseudicius gracilis is a species of jumping spider in the genus Pseudicius that lives in South Africa. The spider was first defined in 2011 by Charles Haddad and Wanda Wesołowska. The spider is small, with an oval carapace between 1.9 and 2.2 mm (0.075 and 0.087 in) long and an ovoid abdomen that measures between 2.7 and 3.0 mm (0.11 and 0.12 in) long. The male and female are similar in size, shape and colouration. The carapace is dark brown with a black eye field and the abdomen is brown with a pattern of six patches that line the sides and two rounded spots to the back. It is almost indistinguishable from species in the genus Afraflacilla, particularly Afraflacilla elegans, Afraflacilla karinae and Afraflacilla zuluensis. It can be best differentiated by its copulatory organs, particularly the shape of the male tibial apo[apophyses, or appendages and the arrangement of pocket and openings on the female epigyne.

== Taxonomy ==
Pseudicius gracilis is a jumping spider that was first described by Charles Haddad and Wanda Wesołowska in 2011. They allocated the species to the genus Pseudicius, first raised by Eugène Simonin 1885. The genus name is related to two Greek words that can be translated false and honest. The genus was provisionally placed alongside Icius that, despite looking superficially similar, has a different etymology. Indeed, Ekaterina Andreeva, Stefania Hęciak and Jerzy Prószyński looked to combine the genera in 1984. The two genera have similar spermathecal structure but work by Wayne Maddison in 1987 demonstrated that they have very different DNA. The two genera were placed in the tribe Heliophaninae alongside Afraflacilla and Marchena. The tribe is ubiquitous across most continents of the world. Maddison renamed the tribe Chrysillini in 2015. The tribe is a member of the clade Saltafresia within the subfamily Salticoida. A year later, in 2016, Jerzy Prószyński allocated the genus to the Pseudiciines group of genera, which was named after the genus. Marchena is a member of the group, while Icius is not. They have a flattened and elongated body and characteristic colour patterns. The species is named after a Latin word that can be translated slender.

== Description ==
Pseudicius gracilis is a small spider with a slender elongated shape. The female has a carapace that is between 1.9 and 2.2 mm (0.075 and 0.087 in) long and typically 1.2 mm (0.047 in) wide. Oval and distinctively flattened, it is dark brown with a covering of thin colourless hairs. It has a reticulated black eye field with a few long bristles around the eyes themselves. The spider has a brown chelicerae, labium and sternum. The ovoid abdomen measures between 2.7 and 3.0 mm (0.11 and 0.12 in) long and between 1.5 and 1.7 mm (0.059 and 0.067 in) wide. It is brown with a pattern of six patches that line the sides and two rounded spots to the back, each of white hairs on its topside and a brown underside. The spinnerets are dark The legs are light brown and have a sparse covering of long, thin brown leg hairs. The forelegs are much longer, stouter and darker compared to the others. It has an oval epigyne, wider than it is long, with two pockets and two round gonopores behind. The copulatory openings and large accessory glands lead to long twisted insemination ducts and narrow spermathecae.

The male is superficially similar to the female. The carapace is about the same size, measuring. typically 1.9 mm (0.075 in) long and 1.2 mm (0.047 in) wide. The carapace is similarly dark brown and the eye field black. The carapace is covered in grey hairs with a few brown hairs near the eyes. The abdomen is similarly brown and patterned like the female, but less distinct. It is typically 2.6 mm (0.10 in) long and 1.4 mm (0.055 in) wide. The pedipalps are brown. It has a short tibia with two apophyses, or appendages, the more forward one longer and more bent. The spider has an ovoid palpal bulb with a large lump at the bottom and a thin curved embolus.

The species is similar to species in the genus Afraflacilla. Particularly, the female is almost indistinguishable from Afraflacilla zuluensis. The male is also similar to that species, differing in the shape of one of the tibial apophyses, and the presence of a larger lump towards the bottom of the appendage. The longer tibial apophysis also differentiates the male from the otherwise similar Afraflacilla karinae, while the female has its epigynal openings and pockets in a different arrangement. The male can be differentiated from Afraflacilla elegans by its two tibial apophyses. These species were originally members of the genus Pseudicius but were moved out of the genus on the basis of the shape of the male palpal bulb and the female insemination ducts.

== Behaviour ==
Pseudicius gracilis creates silk retreats in the thorns of Vachellia erioloba trees. The trees are home to Crematogaster ants that create their own nests by hollowing out these thorns. Haddad and Wesołowska note that the spiders can feast on the ants by attacking through the holes that are created by these hollowing actions. Pseudicius spiders use visual displays during courtship and transmit vibratory signals through silk to communicate to other spiders.

== Distribution and habitat ==
Pseudicius spiders can be found across Afro-Eurasia and the Eastern hemisphere. Pseudicius gracilis is endemic to South Africa. The holotype was found in Sandveld Nature Reserve in Free State, South Africa, during 2003. Other examples have also found in the state. The spider thrives in trees like the common acacia or Vachellia karroo.
