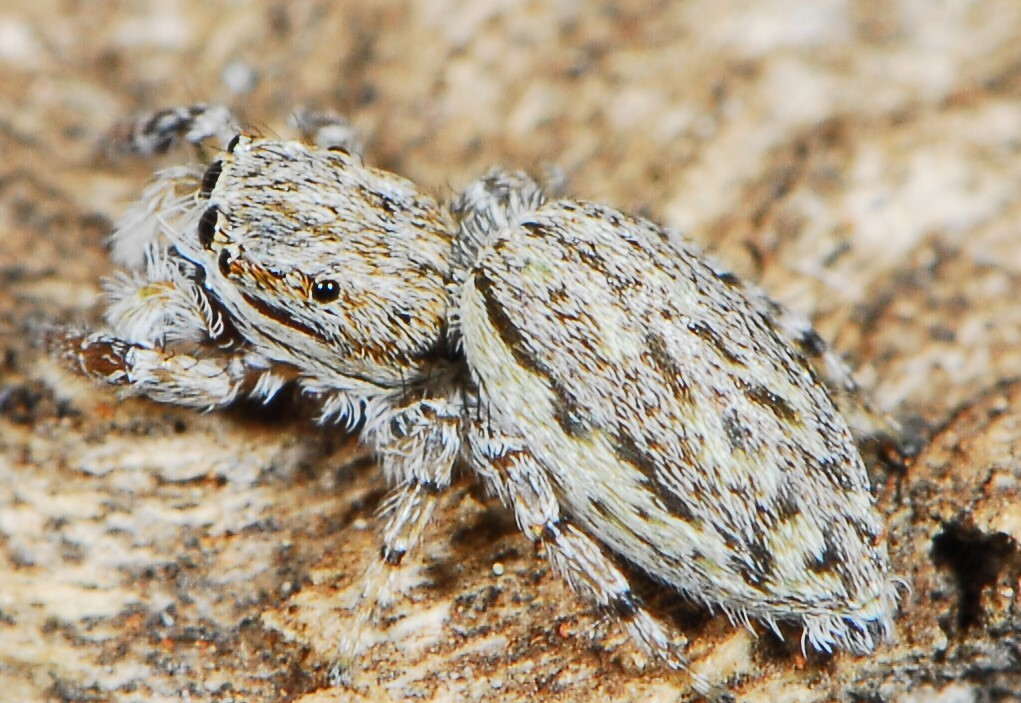
- female P. dependens

Scientific classification
- Kingdom: Animalia
- Phylum: Arthropoda
- Subphylum: Chelicerata
- Class: Arachnida
- Order: Araneae
- Infraorder: Araneomorphae
- Family: Salticidae
- Subfamily: Salticinae
- Genus: Psenuc; Prószyński, 2016

Type species
- Psenuc vesporum (Prószyński, 1992)

Species
- 13, see text

= Psenuc =

Genus of spiders

Psenuc is a genus of spiders in the family Salticidae. It was first described in 2016 by Prószyński.

== Taxonomy ==
The genus Psenuc was one of a number of new genera erected by Jerzy Prószyński in 2016, largely for species formerly placed in Pseudicius. Prószyński placed these genera in his informal group "pseudiciines", with Pseudicius as the representative genus. In Wayne Maddison's 2015 classification of the family Salticidae, Pseudicius, broadly circumscribed, is placed in the tribe Chrysillini, part of the Salticoida clade of the subfamily Salticinae.

== Species ==
As of October 2025, this genus includes thirteen species:

- Psenuc courti (Żabka, 1993) – Papua New Guinea
- Psenuc dentatus (Wesołowska & Haddad, 2013) – Mozambique, South Africa
- Psenuc dependens (Haddad & Wesołowska, 2011) – South Africa
- Psenuc hongkong (Song, Xie, Zhu & Wu, 1997) – China
- Psenuc lalawa Dhiya'ulhaq, 2025 – Indonesia (Sumatra)
- Psenuc manillaensis (Prószyński, 1992) – Philippines
- Psenuc milledgei (Żabka & Gray, 2002) – Western Australia
- Psenuc nuclearis (Prószyński, 1992) – Marshall Islands, Caroline Islands
- Psenuc originalis (Żabka, 1985) – Vietnam
- Psenuc solitarius (Haddad & Wesołowska, 2011) – Namibia, South Africa
- Psenuc solomonensis (Prószyński, 1992) – Solomon Islands
- Psenuc squamatus (Haddad & Wesołowska, 2013) – Mozambique, South Africa
- Psenuc vesporum (Prószyński, 1992) – Philippines (type species)
