= The Marine Pollution Bulletin =

- Discipline: Environment
- Language: English

Publication details
- Publisher: Elsevier
- Impact factor: 7.001 (2021)

Standard abbreviations
- ISO 4: Mar. Pollut. Bull.

Indexing
- ISSN: 0025-326X

Links
- Journal homepage; Online archive

The Marine Pollution Bulletin is an open-access scientific journal that focuses on the study of marine pollution and its effects on the environment and human health. The journal was first published in 1971 and is currently published by Elsevier on behalf of the International Maritime Organization.

The journal covers a wide range of topics related to marine pollution, including the sources and types of pollutants, their impacts on marine ecosystems and organisms, and technologies used to mitigate marine pollution. The journal publishes research articles, review articles, and case studies that provide new insights and advances in the field of marine pollution science.

In addition to its regular articles, the Marine Pollution Bulletin also publishes special issues and supplements on specific topics related to marine pollution. These special issues often include contributions from leading researchers and experts in the field, and provide in-depth coverage of important topics in marine pollution science. The editorial board of the journal is composed of experts in the field of marine pollution, who review and select articles for publication based on their scientific merit and relevance to the journal's scope.

According to the Journal Citation Reports, the journal has a 2021 impact factor of 7.001.

== Abstracting and indexing ==
The journal is indexed in several major databases, including the Science Citation Index, Scopus, and the Web of Science. Its articles are also available through Elsevier's ScienceDirect platform.
