= Journal of Hazardous Materials =

- Discipline: Materials science
- Language: English
- Edited by: Zhen He

Publication details
- History: 1975-present
- Publisher: Elsevier
- Frequency: 20/year
- Open access: Hybrid
- Impact factor: 11.3 (2024)

Standard abbreviations
- ISO 4: J. Hazard. Mater.

Indexing
- CODEN: JHMAD9
- ISSN: 0304-3894 (print); 1873-3336 (web)
- LCCN: sf89091518
- OCLC no.: 644501650

Links
- Journal homepage; Online archive

The Journal of Hazardous Materials is a peer-reviewed, scientific journal that covers the study of hazardous materials and their impact on the environment. The journal is published by Elsevier and was established in 1975. Since 2022, the editor-in-chief is Zhen He (Washington University in St. Louis). The journal publishes original research articles, review articles, and short communications.

== Abstracting and indexing ==
The journal is abstracted and indexed in:

- Aquatic Sciences and Fisheries Abstracts
- Biological Abstracts
- BIOSIS Previews
- CAB Abstracts
- Chemical Abstracts Service
- Current Contents/Engineering, Computing & Technology
- EBSCO databases
- Ei Compendex
- Food Science and Technology Abstracts
- GEOBASE
- Index Medicus/MEDLINE/PubMed
- Inspec
- METADEX
- PASCAL
- ProQuest databases
- Science Citation Index Expanded
- Scopus

According to the Journal Citation Reports, the journal has a 2024 impact factor of 11.3.
