= Analytical Methods (journal) =

- Discipline: Chemistry
- Language: English
- Edited by: Scott Martin

Publication details
- History: 2009–present
- Publisher: Royal Society of Chemistry (United Kingdom)
- Frequency: Monthly
- Open access: Hybrid
- Impact factor: 3.532 (2021)

Standard abbreviations
- ISO 4: Anal. Methods

Indexing
- CODEN: AMNEGX
- ISSN: 1759-9660 (print); 1759-9679 (web)
- OCLC no.: 489019369

Links
- Journal homepage

Analytical Methods is a monthly peer-reviewed scientific journal covering research on the development of analytical techniques. It is published by the Royal Society of Chemistry and the editor-in-chief is Scott Martin (Saint Louis University).

== Abstracting and indexing ==
The journal is abstracted and indexed in Chemical Abstracts Service, Science Citation Index, and Scopus. According to the Journal Citation Reports, the journal has a 2021 impact factor of 3.532.
