= Sentinel species =

Organisms used to detect risks to humans

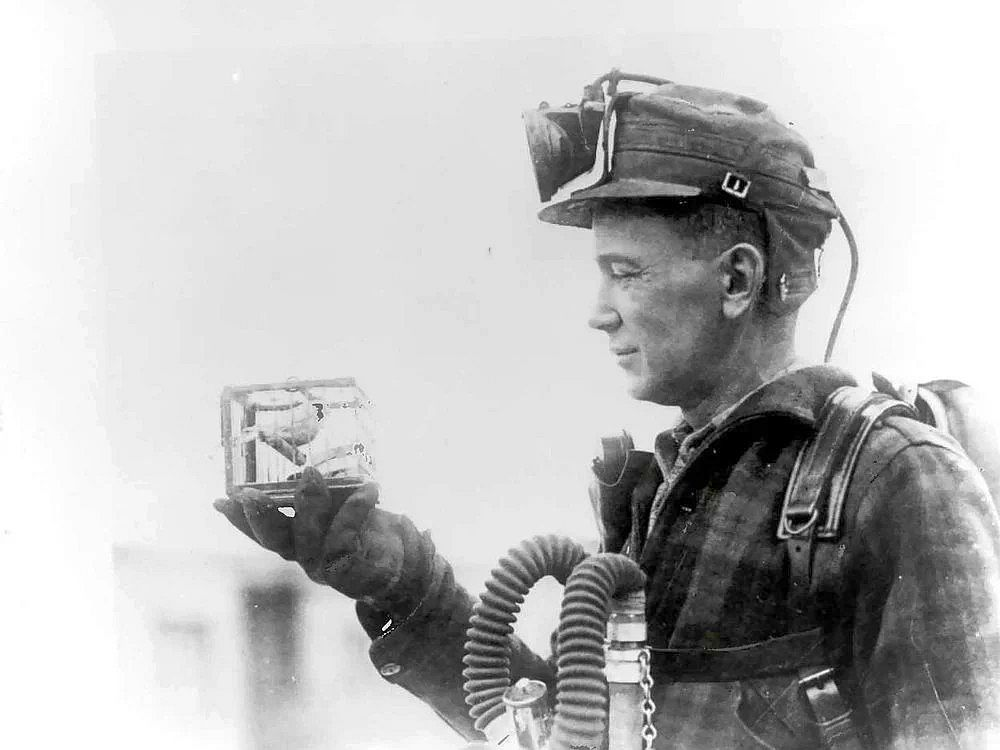
Mining foreman R. Thornburg with a caged canary, in 1928. Canaries were historically used to warn miners of build-up of carbon monoxide gas inside tunnels.

Sentinel species are organisms, often animals, used to detect risks to humans by providing advance warning of a danger. The terms primarily apply in the context of environmental hazards rather than those from other sources. Some animals can act as sentinels because they may be more susceptible or have greater exposure to a particular hazard than humans in the same environment. People have long observed animals for signs of impending hazards or evidence of environmental threats. Plants and other living organisms have also been used for these purposes.

== Historical examples ==
Many observations of animals point to toxicity in food, water or air that would or could harm humans.

=== Canaries ===
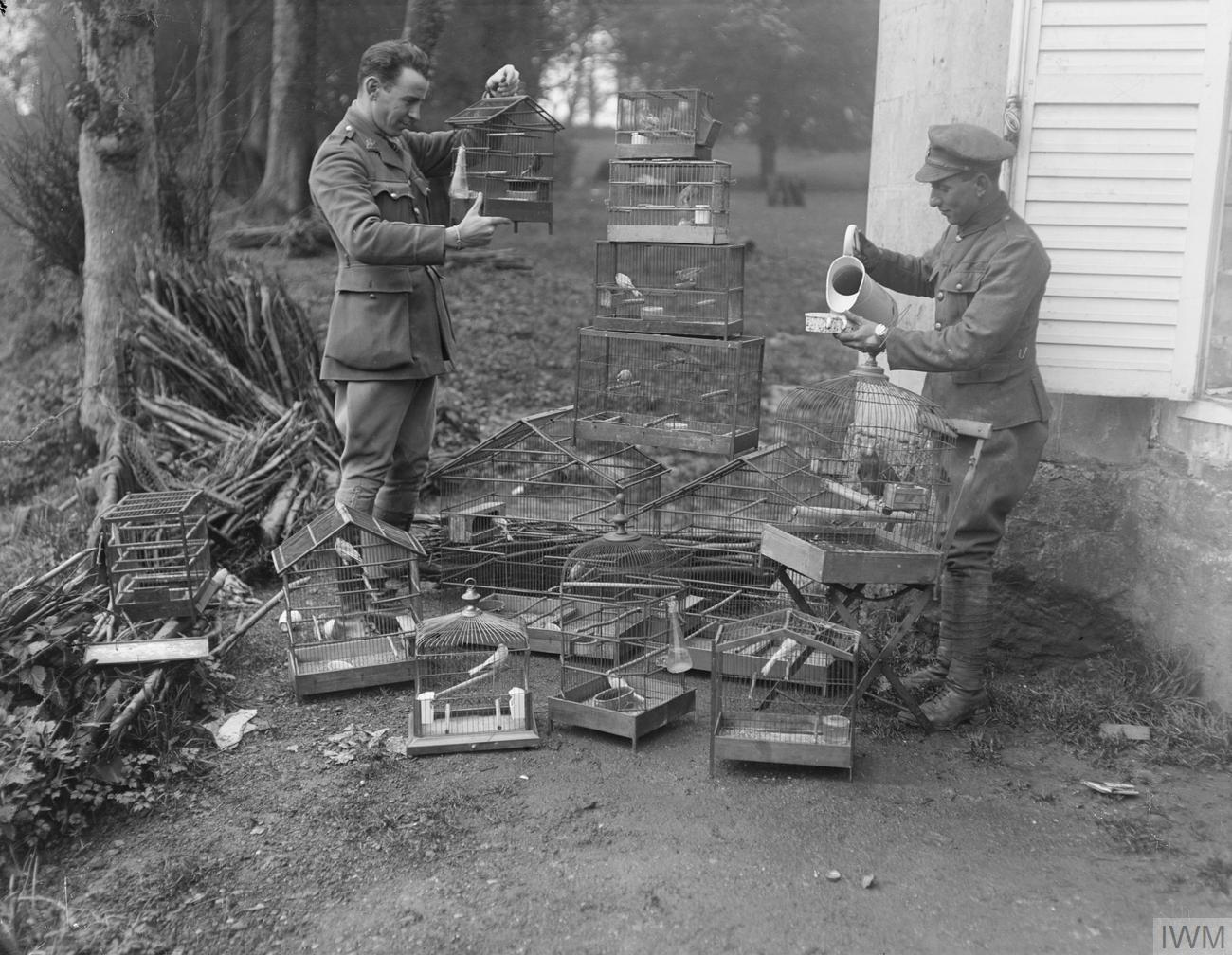
Canaries were used during tunnel warfare in World War I

The classic example is the "canary in a coal mine". The idea of placing a warm-blooded animal in a mine to detect carbon monoxide was first proposed by John Scott Haldane in 1895, and canaries were used as early as 1896. Countries such as Britain, the United States, and Canada used canaries as a sentinel species. Well into the 20th century, coal miners brought canaries into coal mines as an early-warning signal for toxic gases, primarily carbon monoxide. "Canary in the coal mine" is now used as an idiom for a person or thing that warns people of danger.

=== Cats ===
In Minamata Bay, Japan, cats developed "dancing cat fever" before humans were affected due to eating mercury-contaminated fish.

=== Dogs ===
Dogs were recognized as early as 1939 to be more susceptible to tonsil cancer if they were kept in crowded urban environments. Studies similarly found higher disease rates in animals exposed to tobacco smoke.

=== Mussels ===
Bear paw clams being used to monitor water quality in New Caledonia

In Poznań, Poland, eight mussels equipped with sensors are used to ensure the safety of the city's drinking water. These mussels act as bioindicators, meaning they provide a reliable estimation of water toxicity by responding to changes in water quality.

== Characteristics ==
Animal sentinels must have measurable responses to the hazard in question, whether that is due to the animal's death, disappearance, or some other determinable aspect. Many of these species are ideally unendangered and easy to handle. It is important that the species' range overlap with the range being studied.

Some species may show effects of a contaminant before humans due to their size, their reproductive rate, or their increased exposure to the contaminant.

== Specific applications ==
=== Toxic gases ===
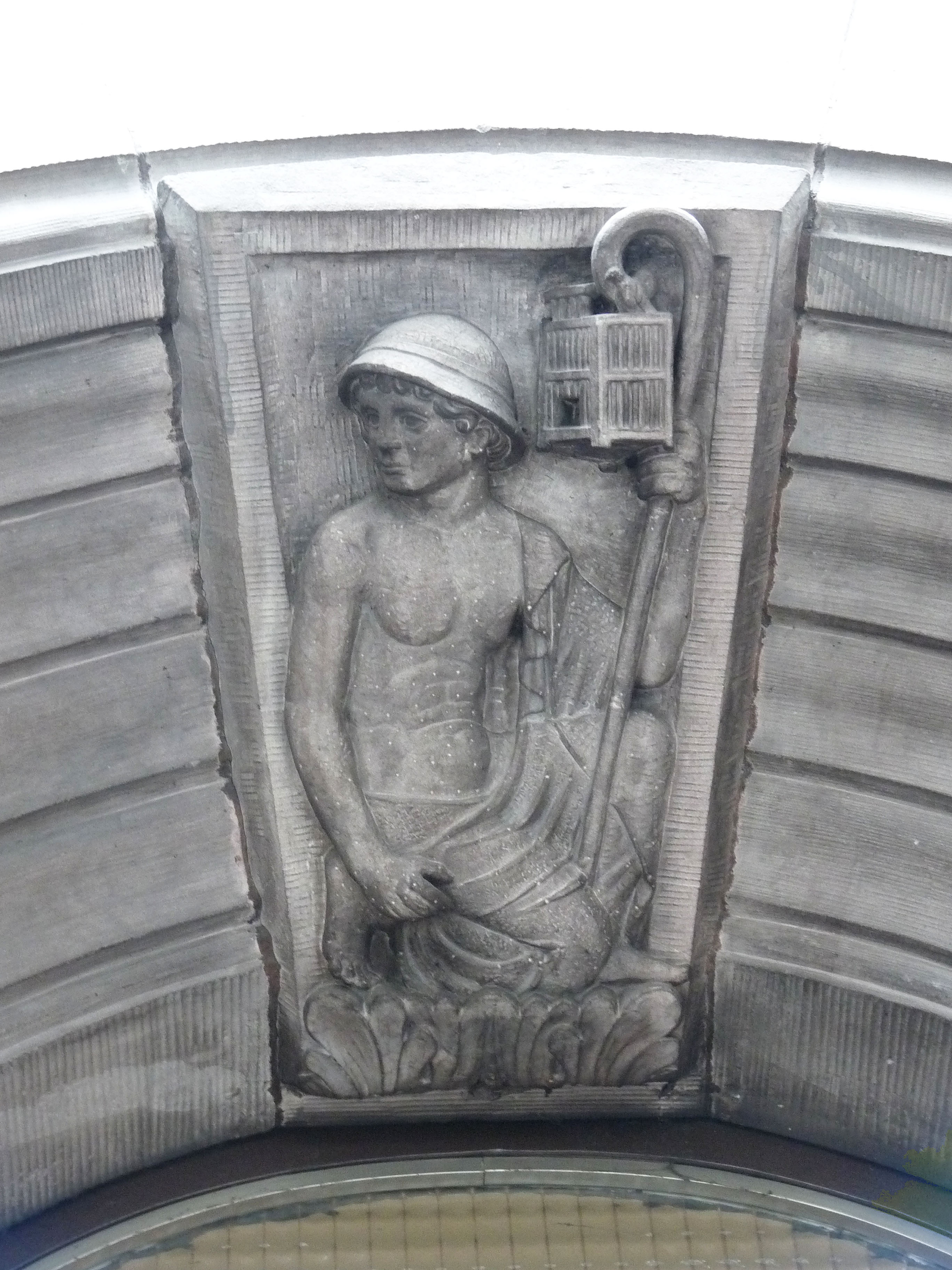
Relief sculpture of a miner's canary in a cage.

Canaries were iconically used in coal mines to detect the presence of carbon monoxide. The bird's rapid breathing rate, small size, and high metabolism, compared to other small animals or the miners, led birds in dangerous mines to succumb before the miners were affected, thereby giving the miners time to take action.

=== Air and water pollution ===
A number of animals have been used to measure varying kinds of air pollution. These include honey bees for air pollution, bivalve molluscs for online water-quality survey and pigeons for atmospheric lead. Bats and swallows have been used to monitor pesticide contamination due to their diet of insects that may have been affected by the chemicals.

Aquatic DDT pollution has been quantitatively measured in California fish. PCB has been measured through the analysis of fish livers. Toxaphene concentrations were discovered far from the area of its use through analysis of trout in the Great Lakes. The evidence of atmospheric transport of the substance influenced the subsequent prohibition of its widespread use. Alligators may have been used to warn of hazardous contamination in Centreville, Mississippi retention ponds.

Scientists also monitor crayfish in the wild in natural bodies of water to study the levels of pollutants there.

The Protivin brewery in the Czech Republic uses crayfish outfitted with sensors to detect any changes in their bodies or pulse activity in order to monitor the purity of the water used in their product. The creatures are kept in a fish tank that is fed with the same local natural source water used in their brewing. If three or more of the crayfish have changes to their pulses, employees know there is a change in the water and examine the parameters.

=== Infectious diseases ===
The discovery of West Nile virus in the Western Hemisphere was heralded by an outbreak of disease in crows and other wild birds. Other emerging diseases have demonstrated linkages between animal health events and human risk, including monkeypox, SARS, and avian influenza. In outbreaks of bubonic plague, rats begin dying out before humans.

=== Household toxins ===
Dogs may provide early warning of lead poisoning hazards in a home, and certain cancers in dogs and cats have been linked to household exposures to pesticides, cigarette smoke, and other carcinogens.

== Cultural references ==
- Kurt Vonnegut in an interview compared the function of artists in human society to coal-mine canaries; see Wikiquote.
- "Canary in a Coalmine" is the title of a non-single track on The Police's 1980 album Zenyatta Mondatta.
- "Canary in a Coalmine" is the title of a non-single track on The Crane Wives' 2012 album The Fool in Her Wedding Gown
- American professional baseball league Charleston Dirty Birds are named for canaries in coal mines.
- Name of the Canary Complex music project is a reference to "canary in the coal mine".

== See also ==
- Guard dog
- Bioindicator
- Indicator species
- Stack canary
- Warrant canary
