= Kaleidoscope (disambiguation) =

A kaleidoscope is a tube of mirrors containing small colored objects.

Kaleidoscope may also refer to:

== Computing ==
- Kaleidoscope (programming language), a constraint programming language
- Kaleidoscope (software), a shareware application similar to the Mac OS Appearance Manager
- Kaleidoscope, a hardware extension for the SAM Coupé home computer

== Mathematics ==
- Kaleidoscope (group theory), the formal description of certain symmetry groups in terms of mirror reflections

== Film, television, and radio ==
- Kaleidoscope (1966 film), British crime film starring Warren Beatty
- Kaleidoscope (1990 film), American television film based on the Danielle Steel novel (see below)
- Kaleidoscope (2016 film), psychological thriller film starring Toby Jones
- Kaleidoscope (British TV series), light entertainment show
- Kaleidoscope (American TV series), a 2023 Netflix heist drama series
- "Kaleidoscope" (Ozark), a 2017 television episode
- Kaleidoscope (US radio series), American discussion program, later renamed The Diane Rehm Show
- Kaleidoscope (UK radio series), British arts programme
- Kaleidoscope Entertainment, Indian film and television production company
- Kaleidoscope, an alternate title for Frenzy, an unproduced Alfred Hitchcock film
- "Kaleidoscope", a 1951 episode of the radio program Dimension X, based on the Ray Bradbury short story (see below)
- Kaleidoscope (organisation), television heritage organisation

== Literature ==
- Kaleidoscope (novel), a 1987 novel by Danielle Steel
- Kaleidoscope (short story collection), a 1990 book by Harry Turtledove
- "Kaleidoscope", a short story by Ray Bradbury in his book The Illustrated Man
- Kaleidoscope: My Life's Multiple Reflections, 2016 novel by Chilean Marcela Del Sol

== Music ==
=== Performers ===
- Kaleidoscope (American band), a 1960s psychedelic folk band
- Kaleidoscope (British band), a 1960s psychedelic band
- Kaleidoscope (music duo), an American Christian pop group

=== Albums ===
- Kaleidoscope (Cyrus Chestnut album), 2018
- Kaleidoscope (DJ Food album), 2000
- Kaleidoscope (Kelis album), 1999
- Kaleidoscope (Nancy Wilson album), 1971
- Kaleidoscope (Rachael Lampa album), 2002
- Kaleidoscope (Siouxsie and the Banshees album), 1980
- Kaleidoscope (Sonny Stitt album), 1957
- Kaleidoscope (Tiësto album) or the title song, 2009
- Kaleidoscope (Transatlantic album) or the title song, 2014
- Kaleidoscopes, a series of albums by Hennie Bekker
- Kaleidoscope, by Ben Granfelt Band, 2009
- Kaleidoscope, by Jam & Spoon, 1997
- Kaleidoscope, by Mekong Delta, 1992
- Kaleidoscope, by Mother Superior, 1997
- Kaleidoscope, by Roland Grapow, 1999

=== EPs ===
- Kaleidoscope EP, by Coldplay, 2017
- Kaleidoscope (Courtney Act EP) or the title song
- Kaleidoscope, by the Boo Radleys, 1990
- Kaleidoscope, by Brooke Duff, 2013

=== Songs ===
- "Kaleidoscope" (Kaya song), 2006
- "Kaleidoscope" (Alicia Keys song), 2024
- "Kaleidoscope", by BadBadNotGood from III, 2014
- "Kaleidoscope", by Blink-182 from Neighborhoods, 2011
- "Kaleidoscope", by Chappell Roan from The Rise and Fall of a Midwest Princess, 2023
- "Kaleidoscope", by Coldplay from A Head Full of Dreams, 2015
- "Kaleidoscope", by Crown the Empire from Retrograde, 2016
- "Kaleidoscope", by D'espairsRay from Mirror, 2007
- "Kaleidoscope", by David Geraghty from Kill Your Darlings, 2007
- "Kaleidoscope", by A Great Big World from When the Morning Comes, 2015
- "Kaleidoscope", by James from The Morning After, 2010
- "Kaleidoscope", by Joe Brooks from Constellation Me, 2010
- "Kaleidoscope", by Kate Havnevik from Melankton, 2006
- "Kaleidoscope", by Knife Party from Abandon Ship, 2014
- "Kaleidoscope", by Machine Head from Catharsis, 2018
- "Kaleidoscope", by Meshuggah from Immutable, 2022
- "Kaleidoscope", by the Ornette Coleman Quartet from This Is Our Music, 1961
- "Kaleidoscope", by Paul van Dyk from Reflections, 2003
- "Kaleidoscope", by Procol Harum from Procol Harum, 1967
- "Kaleidoscope", by Ride from Nowhere, 1990
- "Kaleidoscope", by Ringo Deathstarr from Colour Trip, 2011
- "Kaleidoscope", by Saves the Day from Under the Boards, 2007
- "Kaleidoscope", by the Script from #3, 2012
- "Kaleidoscope", by Simple Minds from Celebration, 1982
- "Kaleidoscope", by the Suicide Machines from A Match and Some Gasoline, 2003
- "Kaleidoscope", by Tiamat from Wildhoney, 1994

== Publications ==
- Kaleidoscope (journal), a peer-reviewed publication of Semmelweis University
- Kaleidoscope (newspaper), a defunct underground newspaper published in Milwaukee, Wisconsin
- The Kaleidoscope, a 19th-century Liverpool weekly magazine
- Kaleidoscope Publishing, a UK publishing house
- Kaleidoscope Magazine, a student publication of Poudre High School, Fort Collins, Colorado, U.S.

== Other uses ==
- Kaleidoscope (Expo 67), a pavilion at Expo 67 in Montreal, Canada
- Kaleidoscope (retailer), a British mail order company
- Kaleidoscope Festival, Sophia College, an annual arts festival in Mumbai, India
- Kaleidoscope at the Hub, a shopping mall in Des Moines, Iowa, U.S.
- The Kaleidoscope Trust, an organisation that campaigns for human rights of LGBT people worldwide
- Kaleidescape, an American multimedia company
- Kaleidoscope, a collective name for a group of butterflies; see List of animal names

== See also ==
- Kaleidoscópio, a Brazilian drum and bass duo
