= Glitter (Kaya album) =

Studio album by Kaya
- Released: December 27, 2006
- Genre: Electropop, darkwave

Kaya chronology
Glitter (2006)	Hyakki Yagyō (2007)

Glitter is the debut album of ex-Schwarz Stein vocalist Kaya, released on December 27, 2006.

Glitter contains remixes Kaya's first two singles "Kaleidoscope" and "Masquerade", as well as "Psycho Butterfly", the B-side of "Masquerade". All background music is composed by Hora (ex Schwarz Stein).

== Track listing ==
1. "Kaleidoscope -Glitter mix" - 4:23
2. "Walküre" - 4:38 (Valkyrie)
3. "Paradise lost" - 4:45
4. "Psycho Butterfly -Nightmare mix-" - 5:57
5. "Masquerade -Fabulous Night mix-" - 5:22
6. "Rose Jail" - 3:30
7. "Silvery Dark" - 6:37
8. "Glitter Arch"- 4:43
9. "Hydrangea" - 5:50
