= Masquerade (Kaya song) =

Single by Kaya
- Released: September 6, 2006
- Genre: Electronic music
- Length: 11:10
- Songwriter: KALM

Kaya singles chronology
"Kaleidoscope" (2006)	"Masquerade" (2006)	"桜花繚乱" (2007)

"Masquerade" is the second single by Kaya (ex-Schwarz Stein) released on September 6, 2006. The single peaked at 13th on the Oricon Indie chart during the first week of its release.

"Masquerade" is an upbeat jazz number while the coupling track, "Psycho Butterfly", pulls Kaya back to his electronic/digital-gothic roots. Like his first single "Kaleidoscope", both tracks on "Masquerade" were composed by ex-Velvet Eden's KALM.

== Track listing ==
1. "Masquerade" – 5:17
2. "Psycho Butterfly" – 5:53
