= Kaleidoscope (Kaya song) =

Single by Kaya
- Released: June 28, 2006
- Genre: Electronic music
- Length: 10:32

Kaya singles chronology
"Kaleidoscope" (2006)	"Masquerade" (2006)

"Kaleidoscope" is the first single by Japanese ex-Schwarz Stein vocalist Kaya. It was released on June 28, 2006, and peaked at 15th on the Oricon Indie chart during the first week of its release.

Both tracks on "Kaleidoscope" have a distinct digital-gothic sound and were composed by ex-Velvet Eden keyboardist KALM.

== Track listing ==
1. "Kaleidoscope" – 5:07
2. "Remains of Mind" – 5:25
