= Glitter (disambiguation) =

Glitter is a mixture of shiny, flat reflective particles.

Glitter may also refer to:

== Film and television ==
- Glitter (film), a 2001 American romantic musical drama starring Mariah Carey
- Glitter (American TV series), a 1984 American television drama series
- Glitter (Polish TV series), a 2022 Polish drama television series
- "Glitter" (How I Met Your Mother), a television episode

== Music ==
- Glitter rock, also known as glam rock
- Gary Glitter (Paul Francis Gadd, born 1944), English pop star and convicted sex offender
- The Glitter Band, Gary Glitter's former background band

=== Albums ===
- Glitter (Gary Glitter album), 1972
- Glitter (Kaya album), 2006
- Glitter (EP), by 070 Shake, 2018
- Glitter (soundtrack), to the 2001 film

=== Songs ===
- "Glitter" (Benee song), 2019
- "Glitter" (Perfume song), 2010
- "Glitter"/"Fated", by Ayumi Hamasaki, 2007
- "Glitter", by No Age from the album Everything in Between, 2010
- "Glitter", by Tyler, the Creator from the album Flower Boy, 2017
- "Glitter", by Mötley Crüe from the album Generation Swine, 1997
- "Glitter", by Todrick Hall from the EP Haus Party, Pt. 1, 2019

== Other ==
- Glitter (chimpanzee)
- Glitter bombing, a form of civil disobedience
- Stephanie Harrington, or Glitter, a character from the Marvel Comics series D.P. 7
- Sun glitter, the bright, sparkling reflection of sunlight off of water waves
