= Hora (musician) =

Japanese musician

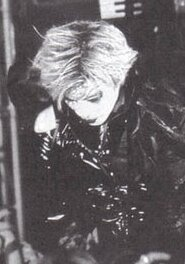
- Hora performing with Schwarz Stein in 2003

Background information
- Born: May 10, 1980 (age 45)
- Genres: Electronic music; dark wave; rock; futurepop; EBM
- Occupations: Musician; songwriter; DJ; record producer
- Instrument: Keyboards
- Years active: 2000–present
- Member of: Schwarz Stein; Mayohk
- Formerly of: Velvet Eden; Another Cell
- Website: hora.base.ec

Hora (Japanese: ホラ, 洞; born May 10, 1980) is a Japanese musician, songwriter, DJ, and record producer, best known as the keyboardist of the visual kei dark wave band Schwarz Stein. Starting as a member of Velvet Eden, he later formed Schwarz Stein with Kaya. Since 2005, he has pursued a solo career, in addition to collaborating with other artists.

== Career ==
Hora's music career started in 2000 when he became a keyboardist of the dark wave band Velvet Eden. During his time in Velvet Eden, the group shifted toward a rock-oriented sound and released several works, including the single "Sute Neko" and demo tape "Kumo Onna". Hora left Velvet Eden the following year, 2001.

Following his departure from Velvet Eden, Hora co-founded the dark wave band Schwarz Stein (initially known as Rudolf Steiner) with Kaya. The duo, produced by Mana and signed to Midi:Nette, gained significant popularity within the visual kei and Japanese goth scenes. In 2004, Schwarz Stein disbanded due to creative differences between its two members.

Hora started a solo career in 2005. He composes, writes lyrics, provides vocals, and produces his own releases. His solo project is based on electronic music, ranging from futurepop to EBM. Some tracks feature guest vocalists. Hora's first solo album, Inner Universe, was released in March 2005. It was followed by The World in December of that year.

Aside from working on his solo career, Hora has also composed songs for other artists, including Kaya and pop musicians. He wrote three songs for Kaya's solo debut album, Glitter, and also composed tracks on Kaya's major singles, "Chocolat" and "Ophelia", and on Kaya's albums Queen and Rose. In 2006, Hora collaborated with Kaya for a one-off project called Another Cell.

Prominence, Hora's third solo album, was released in September 2006. Two albums were released in 2007: Venom and Icebound. His 2008 album, Reign, had a lighter and more melodious sound than his prior releases. Another album, Dominate, came out in October 2009.

In May 2010, Hora announced his retirement from music due to poor health. Because of this, the best-of compilation Wisdom was advertised as his last album. His health improved, and in July 2011, he returned to performing live for a Schwarz Stein reunion show. November 2012 saw the release of Hora's next album, Tyrant. His tenth album, Cocoon, was released in June 2013.

Schwarz Stein resumed activity in March 2014 and started releasing new music. In 2025, Hora and Közi formed a duo under the name Mayohk. In that same year, they performed at a festival in Brazil.

== Discography ==
=== Solo ===
Studio albums

- Inner Universe (2005)
- The World (2005)
- Prominence (2006)
- Venom (2007)
- Icebound (2007)
- Reign (2008)
- Dominate (2009)
- Wisdom (2010)
- Tyrant (2012)
- Cocoon (2013)
- Desolation Beauty (2014)
- Cocytus (2015)
- Resonant (2018)

=== Velvet Eden ===
- "Sute Neko" (2000)
- "Kumo Onna" (2000)
- "Kumo no Sujiro・Kajuen" (2001)

=== Schwarz Stein ===
Studio albums

- New Vogue Children (2003)
- Artificial Hallucination (2004)
- Recurrence of Hallucination (2011)
- Demigod (2024)

=== Mayohk ===
- C'est si bon (2025)

=== Other ===
- Kaya – Glitter (2006)
- "Another Cell" (2006)
- Kaya – "Chocolat" (2008)
- Kaya – "Ophelia" (2009)
- Kaya – Queen (2011)
- Kaya – Rose (2022)
