= New Vogue Children =

New vogue children

Studio album by Schwarz Stein
- Released: June 30, 2003
- Genres: Metal, EBM
- Length: 35:32
- Label: Midi:Nette
- Producers: Schwarz Stein, Mana

Schwarz Stein chronology
New vogue children (2003)	Artificial Hallucination (2004)

New Vogue Children is the debut studio album by Japanese band Schwarz Stein, released in 2003.

The first print of the album came with a limited poster and a special "Message CD" with a spoken message from the band.

== Track listing ==
1. "the alternation of generations -conception-" (music: Hora) – 0:46
2. "Release me" (music: Hora, lyrics: Kaya) – 3:46
3. "Rise to Heaven" (music: Hora, lyrics: Kaya) – 4:20
4. "Queen of Decadence" (music: Hora, lyrics: Kaya) – 4:07
5. "transient" (music: Hora, lyrics: Kaya) – 4:54
6. "Bio Genesis" (music and lyrics: Hora) – 3:45
7. "fester love" (music and lyrics: Hora) – 4:42
8. "Succubus" (music: Hora, lyrics: Kaya) – 3:37
9. "New vogue children" (music: Hora, lyrics: Kaya) – 4:32
10. "the alternation of generations -increase-" (music: Hora) – 1:03

== Personnel ==
- Kaya - Vocals, lyrics
- Hora - Keyboards, vocals, and programming
