= Joe Brooks (singer) =

British singer and songwriter

- Joe Brooks: photo by Richard Guerrero

Background information
- Born: Joseph David Tancock; 18 May 1987 (age 39)
- Origin: Southampton, Hampshire, England
- Genres: Pop, rock, acoustic music
- Occupations: Singer-songwriter, musician
- Instruments: Vocals, piano, guitar
- Label: Unsigned
- Website: www.joebrooks.com

Joe Brooks (born Joseph David Tancock; 18 May 1987) is an English singer and songwriter. Brooks started out as a Myspace musician when he was just 17 and quickly gained popularity on the site while releasing two independent EPs. By 2008 he was hyped and labelled as the "Number 1 Unsigned UK Artist" on MySpace and had amassed 11 million song plays. In 2009 he signed to Jason Flom's Lava Records and Universal Republic Records, where he released his first full-length and major label album, Constellation Me, in 2010. Following his exit from Lava/Universal in 2011, he released a fan-funded independent EP, A Reason to Swim, later that year.

== Early life ==
Joe Brooks was born on 18 May 1987 in Southampton, England. He is the son of a trucking-business owner, and a primary-school teacher. He has an older sister and a younger brother. He grew up in Shirley, Southampton, where he attended Wordsworth and St. Mark's Schools. He focused predominantly on sports as a child and he began playing tennis when he was four years old and continued to play for the next twelve years, which included participating in competitive tennis tournaments. He quit tennis at the age of 16 when he decided to focus on a potential career of sports coaching instead.

Meanwhile, Brooks's interest in music also began at a young age, when he saw his mother play the piano. He asked her for piano lessons when he was 10 years old. He took formal piano lessons for a year before quitting due to his lack of interest in classical compositions. A few years later when he was 16, he saw musician and guitarist Derrin Nauendorf play at a local music club. This inspired him to pick up the guitar. Using his mother's old classical guitar, he began to teach himself to play in his room. He received help from various musicians whom he met while attending the Soul Survivor music festivals. Inspired by artists such as Jack Johnson, Jason Mraz, and Bryan Adams, Brooks threw himself into music and started to practice singing and composing songs.

After leaving Mountbatten Secondary School in Hampshire, his interest in the guitar and music recording lead him to focus on Music Technology classes while he attended Barton Peveril Sixth Form College. Between music classes in college and recording at home on his own digital recorder, he began to produce his own songs and covers, which became popular via Myspace.

== Myspace and Maybe Tomorrow ==
After a year of learning to make music, Brooks started his own Myspace page on 3 April 2005 and began posting music to it. Around this time he also met his first manager, Stewart Dugdale, who signed him to South Star Music, a management and studio business that Dugdale had recently started. Brooks just happened to meet Dugdale when he bought sound equipment from him. During this initial meeting, Brooks played guitar for Dugdale, who took interest in him and signed him to a management deal. Using Dugdale's small recording studio, Brooks would begin recording his first EP, Maybe Tomorrow.

During the recording of Maybe Tomorrow Brooks began gaining popularity through his Myspace page, which led to interest from other managers and labels. Brooks had offers to sign production deals and record label contracts at this time, but did not take them due to concerns with contract terms.

After graduating from Barton Peveril, Brooks attended the University of Bath to focus on a degree in Sports Development and Coach Education. During his first year at Bath, Tim Byrne, the manager of other manufactured UK acts Steps and A1, contacted him. After a series of meetings with Byrne in London, Brooks signed with Byrne as his new manager and ultimately decided to drop out from the University of Bath to focus on his music career.

Brooks released his first CD, Maybe Tomorrow on 7 March 2006 and created his own website for promotion. He sold the album online through his site and Myspace. He also continued playing live shows in small venues around Southampton and Bath.

== Transition to America ==
While attending college for his Coaching degree, Brooks began to express interest in travelling to America and playing shows there. An American professor at Bath, Eric Anderson, helped him arrange for an extended trip to California. In September 2006, Brooks travelled to America for the first time to tour small venues around California and Nevada and make contacts with people in the music business. Securing his own gigs, Brooks performed at small clubs and coffeehouses in San Diego, San Francisco, Las Vegas and Los Angeles. This self-managed tour lasted for around a month before Brooks travelled back to the UK to return to school. It was also during this month that he would meet his next manager, Ginger McCartney, the mother of Jesse McCartney, a previous child actor who was given a record contract.

The experience of playing shows in California led Brooks to quit school and focus on music full-time. Upon returning to the UK, Tim Byrne set up a tour with Brooks to open for Journey South, another band that Byrne managed. It was a step up for Brooks, who was playing shows of 2,000 to 2,500 people during the Journey South tour.

With a new-found interest and focus toward America, Brooks began travelling to California to build a career there. He switched management to Ginger McCartney and opened for Jesse McCartney on tour, which included a tour stint with both Jesse McCartney and the Jonas Brothers in April 2007. Not able to afford a visa needed to officially move to America, Brooks split his time between California and the UK. He would travel to California for a few months at a time and then return to England for a month, before returning to California again.

During this period Brooks released another EP, the Acoustic Sessions EP, and continued to grow his popularity with Myspace. In 2008, he was declared the "Number 1 Unsigned Artist" in the UK on the site and held the title for a year while amassing 11 million song plays and 100,000 profile friends, although there is no official evidence for these figures. This popularity helped Brooks sell out shows when he embarked on his first official tour in January 2009 with shows around the UK, including venues like the O2 Academy 3 in Birmingham.

== Universal/Lava Records and Constellation Me ==
In May 2009, Brooks signed a record deal with Jason Flom for Lava Records and Universal Republic with the help of his now-manager Ken Krongard. After various label offers he had turned down and other deals that fell through, Brooks was now signed to a major label. With major label backing, Brooks was able to obtain a visa that allowed him to officially move to America. He also began work on his first full-length album, Constellation Me. Production and recording for the album took place in Los Angeles and Stockholm, Sweden, with a handful of producers and used material that Brooks had been working on for the past few years. The lead single, "Superman," was a song from Brooks's early Myspace days that had proven popular on the site.

The "Superman" music video was filmed on 27 May 2010 and featured Giglianne Braga as the female lead, who was currently on the "If I Can Dream" reality show. The "If I Can Dream" film crew recorded the music video production and Brooks also visited the "If I Can Dream" house to see the rest of the cast, but the event was not featured on the show. The collaboration came from Brooks having connections with Simon Fuller, the creator of "If I Can Dream," who at one point considered casting Brooks on the show.

Constellation Me was released on 7 September 2010. Promotion for the album was brief, but included Brooks making his first national television appearance on Fox5 News in San Diego and later on SanDiego6. Tracks from the album saw commercial use, with "These Broken Hands of Mine" being featured on the show Grey's Anatomy and "Superman" on the movie Step Up 3D. The album was not a commercial success and Brooks was dropped by Lava/Universal Republic. On 1 June 2011 Brooks announced on his Facebook that he was now an independent artist.

== Second independent career and A Reason to Swim ==
Following his release from Lava/Universal Republic, Brooks focused on being an independent artist again and immediately began work on a new EP. Using the site Pledgemusic, Brooks started a pledge campaign and succeeded in funding his next album through fan donations. The funds were used to record his EP A Reason To Swim, that was released on 6 September 2011 in the US. A music video for the song "Holes Inside" was also produced and released a day after the album.

Brooks attracted enough international fans from Asia and was able to sign with Sony in Korea and Malaysia who licensed his A Reason to Swim for release there. To coincide with a media tour of Asia, Brooks ran a charity marathon to raise funds for a mission trip to China. In July 2011, Brooks travelled to China for two weeks to be a part of the Bring Me Hope Foundation, which focuses on the needs of orphans in China. Afterward, he attended a media tour in Korea to support A Reason To Swim, appearing on national television and Korean publications of Nylon and Teen Vogue. The album did well in Korea and the song "Holes Inside" reached the top 5 on the Korean pop charts.

While on his tour of the United States, Brooks made and sold a select number of limited edition CDs named The Mixtape. The band ran out of copies of A Reason To Swim in the middle of the tour, so until the new shipment arrived they sold these special edition CDs. The CD featured a hand-drawn CD jacket and a selection of songs picked by Joe Brooks that were burned onto a writable CD. The Mixtape included a mixture of songs from A Reason to Swim and Constellation Me, as well as a recorded cover of Hallelujah that is not available on iTunes. He continued to tour and released The Boy & the Broken Machine on 1 June 2013. On 11 August 2016, he released I Am Bones.

In October 2018, Brooks appeared on the blind dating television show, First Dates Hotel.

== Personal life ==
Brooks has been involved with different charity works and attributes his desire to help to his Christian faith. This charity work includes the Invisible Children Organization, going to Africa with his father when he was 19 for Habitat For Humanity and then to China in 2011 with the Bring Me Hope Foundation.

Other interests include design and film, with Brooks being involved with artistic endeavours such as his website, album and poster design. He also directed his music video for Til My Heart Stops Beating, which also stars Tammin Sursok. Brooks made a point to include his fans during the scene at the Roxy Theater in Hollywood, CA as well.

== Discography ==
=== Studio albums ===
- Constellation Me (2010)

=== Extended plays ===
- Maybe Tomorrow (2006)
- Acoustic Sessions (2007)
- A Reason to Swim (2011)
- The Boy & the Broken Machine (2013)
- I Am Bones (2016)

=== Singles ===
From Constellation Me

- "Superman" (2010)
- "World at Our Feet" (2010)

From A Reason to Swim (EP)

- "Holes Inside" (2011)

From The Boy & the Broken Machine (EP)

- "'Til My Heart Stops Beating" (2013)

Non-album singles

- "Have Yourself a Merry Little Christmas" (2011)
- "Say Something" - cover by Joe Brooks and Tammin Sursok (2014)
- "Pink Sky Moon" (2020)
