= Pure Mood =

Studio album by Ringo Deathstarr
- Released: December 11, 2015
- Genre: Shoegaze, noise pop, alternative rock
- Label: Club AC30, Sonic Unyon, Vinyl Junkie Recordings, The Reverberation Appreciation Society

Ringo Deathstarr chronology
| Gods Dream (2013) | Pure Mood (2015) |

Professional ratings
Review scores
| Source | Rating |
|---|---|
| AllMusic | 4/5 stars |
| Drowned in Sound | (7/10) |

Pure Mood is the fourth studio album by American shoegaze band Ringo Deathstarr. It was released on December 11, 2015, by Vinyl Junkie Recordings in Japan, and on January 20, 2016, by The Reverberation Appreciation Society (RVRB-024) in North America. The album was recorded in two different locations: Sky Lab in Los Angeles, and Storage Town in Austin, Texas.

== Track listing ==
| No. | Title | Length |
|---|---|---|
| 1. | "Dream Again" | 1:59 |
| 2. | "Heavy Metal Suicide" | 3:40 |
| 3. | "Stare at the Sun" | 4:19 |
| 4. | "Show Me the Truth of Your Love" | 3:54 |
| 5. | "Big Bopper" | 2:41 |
| 6. | "Guilt" | 3:00 |
| 7. | "California Car Collection" | 3:31 |
| 8. | "Frisbee" | 3:26 |
| 9. | "Boys in Heat" | 5:00 |
| 10. | "Never" | 3:14 |
| 11. | "Old Again" | 3:23 |
| 12. | "Acid Tongue" | 3:51 |
