= Constellation Me =

Studio album by Joe Brooks
- Released: 7 September 2010
- Recorded: 2009, 2010 at: Olympic Recordings (Los Angeles, CA); RW Productions (Los Angeles, CA); Pilot Studios (Stockholm, Sweden); The Village (Los Angeles, CA); The Backyard Studios (Los Angeles, CA)
- Genre: Pop
- Length: 41:42
- Label: Lava Music/Universal Republic Records
- Producers: Rune Westberg, Carl Falk, Carl Bjorsell, Stuart Brawley

Constellation Me is the debut studio album by British singer/songwriter and musician Joe Brooks, released on 7 September 2010 on the label Lava Records/Universal Republic Records in the United States. Constellation Me is the first major label release by Brooks and his third music release overall.

== Background ==
Constellation Me began production in 2009 when Brooks signed to Jason Flom's Lava Records and Universal Republic Records. Production and recording for the album took place in Los Angeles, California and Stockholm, Sweden with a handful of producers and used material that Brooks had been working on for the past few years. The album's single, "Superman", was a song that had proven popular on Brooks's Myspace page. The "Superman" music video filmed on 27 May 2010 and featured Giglianne Braga as the female lead, who was currently on the "If I Can Dream" reality show. Memorabilia from the "Superman" shoot would later be raffled off as part of the funding/promotion for Brooks's next album, A Reason To Swim.

Constellation Me was released on 7 September 2010. Promotion for the album was brief, but included Brooks making his first national television appearance on Fox5 News in San Diego and later on SanDiego6. Tracks from the album saw commercial use, with "These Broken Hands of Mine" being featured on the show Grey's Anatomy and "Superman" on the movie Step Up 3D. The album was not a commercial success and Brooks was dropped by Lava/Universal Republic.

== Track listing ==
No.	Title	Writer(s)	Length
1.	"World at Our Feet"	Joe Brooks, Jack McManus	3:23
2.	"Feel the Sunshine"	Joe Brooks, Steve McMorran	3:53
3.	"Lead the Crowd"	Joe Brooks, Rune Westberg	3:51
4.	"Superman"	Joe Brooks, Charlie Grant, Pete Woodroffe	3:26
5.	"Five Days of Summer"	Joe Brooks, Rune Westberg, Pam Sheyne	4:00
6.	"Marching Band"	Joe Brooks, Carl Falk, Carl Bjorsell	3:32
7.	"Hello Mr. Sun"	Joe Brooks, Carl Falk, Carl Bjorsell	3:17
8.	"Kaleidoscope"	Joe Brooks	4:18
9.	"Rules of Attraction"	Joe Brooks, Rune Westberg	5:07
10.	"These Broken Hands of Mine"	Joe Brooks, Carl Falk, Carl Bjorsell	4:09
11.	"Voices"	Joe Brooks	2:46
12.	"Apple"	Joe Brooks, Charlie Grant, Pete Woodroffe	3:47

== Personnel ==
=== Musicians ===
- Joe Brooks: Vocals, Acoustic Guitar (all tracks)
- Fredrick Bokkenheuser: Drums
- Jason Borger: Keyboards
- Rune Westberg: Additional Guitars, Bass, Percussion, Programming
- Stuart Brawley: Piano, Organ, Keyboards
- Victor Indrizzo: Drums, Percussion
- Carl Falk: Keyboards, Programming, Additional Guitars, Backing Vocals
- Ilya Toshinsky: Additional Guitars
- Carl Bjorsell: Backing Vocals
- Mikal Blue: Bass
- Martin Bylund: Violin
- Mattias Johansson: Violin
- Irene Bylund: Viola
- David Bukovinszky: Cello
- Joe Corcoran: Electric Guitars, Bass, Horns, Percussion
- Jason Borger: Organ
- Joacim Otterbjork: Bass

=== Production ===
- Rune Westberg: Producer, Engineer, Mixer
- Carl Falk: Producer, Engineer
- Carl Bjorsell: Producer, Engineer
- Mark Endert: Mixer
- Stuart Brawley: Producer, Engineer, Programmer, Mixer
- Management: Ken Krongard
- Doug Mark: Legal
- Pamela Littky: Photography
- Joe Spix: Art, Direction
