= Ringo Deathstarr =

American shoegaze band

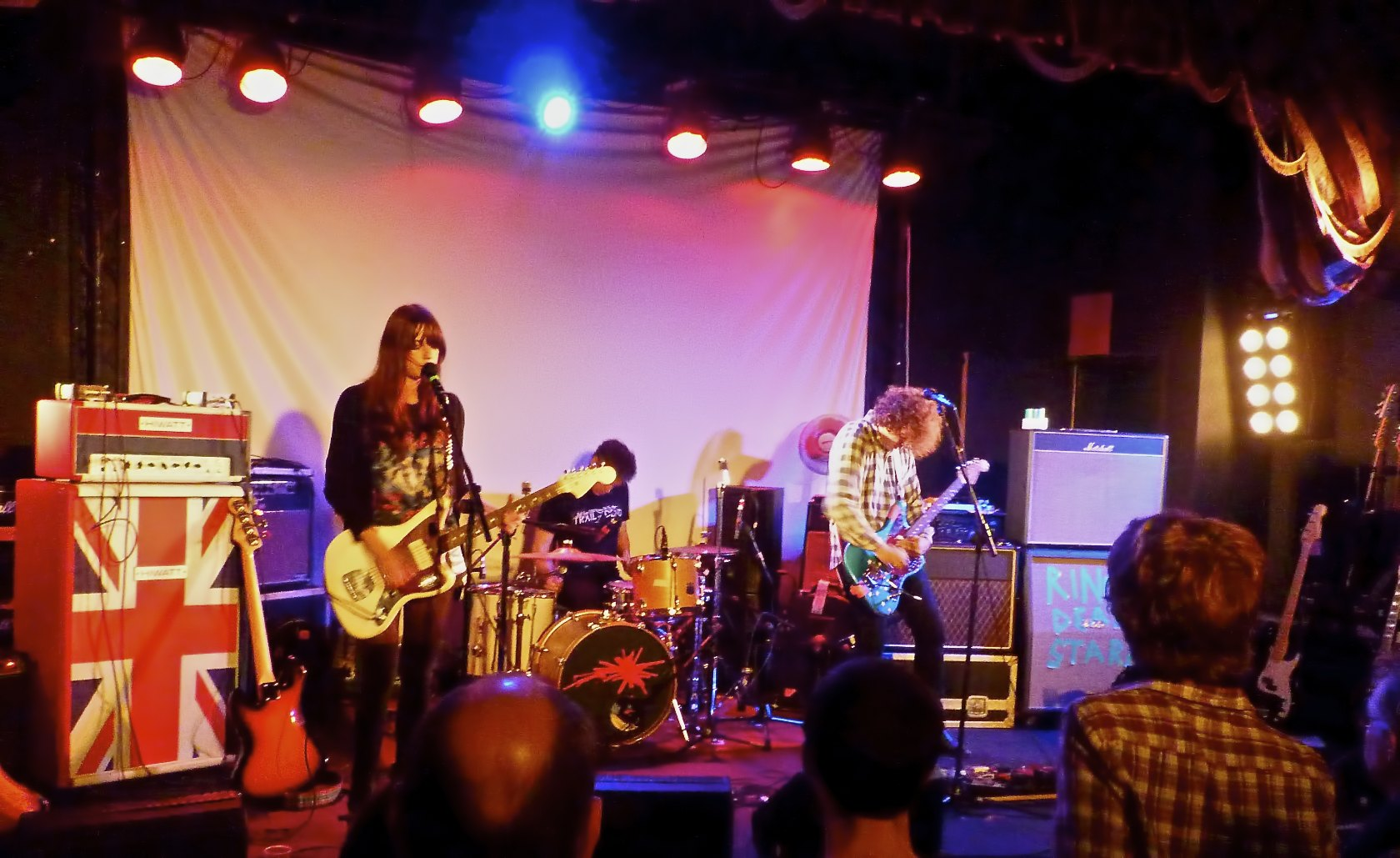
- Live at The Globe, Cardiff, November 23, 2010.

Background information
- Origin: Austin, Texas, U.S.
- Genres: Shoegaze, noise pop, alternative rock
- Years active: 2005–present
- Labels: SVC Records; Custom Made Music; Club AC30; Sonic Unyon; Vinyl Junkie Recordings; Neon Sigh
- Members: Elliott Frazier; Alex Gehring; Daniel Coborn
- Past members: Dustin Gaudet; Renan McFarland; Stephen Hablinski; Austin Brown; Erin Pursley

Ringo Deathstarr is an American shoegaze band from Austin, Texas, formed by singer/songwriter Elliott Frazier in 2005. The band name is a combination of the Beatles drummer Ringo Starr and the Star Wars Death Star.

== History ==
Ringo Deathstarr was started by Frazier in 2005 in his Texas hometown, Beaumont. After he moved to the busier city of Austin, a band lineup stabilized consisting of Frazier, bassist Alex Gehring, guitarist Renan McFarland and drummer Dustin Gaudet.

The band's debut five-song EP, Ringo Deathstarr, was initially released by SVC Records in the UK in early 2007, and then self released later the same year in the US (and later reissued in 2009 by Fan Death Records).

The EP was followed by a string of 7" singles, including "You Don't Listen" (released September 2009 on Custom Made Music), "In Love" (released on September 14, 2009, on SVC Records), "Tambourine Girl" (the B-side to a split single with the Depreciation Guild, released in 2009 by UK label Club AC30) and "So High" (released on January 31, 2011, by Club AC30).

On November 4, 2009, Japanese label Vinyl Junkie Recordings issued a compilation album, Sparkler, collecting the debut EP, the two tracks from the "In Love" single, and two additional tracks.

The band's debut full-length album, Colour Trip, was first released by Club AC30 on February 14, 2011, in the UK, then licensed to Sonic Unyon for release in North America, and Vinyl Junkie Recordings for release in Japan. By this time, McFarland and Gaudet had departed, and Daniel Coborn had joined on drums. Another EP, Shadow, followed on November 2. They toured with the Smashing Pumpkins in the winter of 2011–2012.

Ringo Deathstarr's second studio album, Mauve, was released on September 19, 2012, by Club AC30, Sonic Unyon and Vinyl Junkie Recordings. It was previewed by the release of the first track, "Rip", as a CD single on September 5 by Vinyl Junkie and a 7" single on September 14 by Club AC30.

The mini-album God's Dream was issued on December 18, 2013. The band's next album, Pure Mood, was released on November 20, 2015, with The Reverberation Appreciation Society taking over as North American distributor.

On March 27, 2020, Ringo Deathstarr was released as a self titled album on Club AC30. The single "God Help the Ones You Love" was released earlier that year to promote the album. A west coast tour was planned for mid 2020, but it was ultimately postponed due to the COVID-19 pandemic.

== Style ==
Ringo Deathstarr has been compared to earlier shoegaze bands such as My Bloody Valentine, Ride, the Jesus & Mary Chain and Medicine. AllMusic described them as "shoegaze revivalists from Texas who play it pretty straight, but aren't afraid to add extra noise to the mix".

== Discography ==
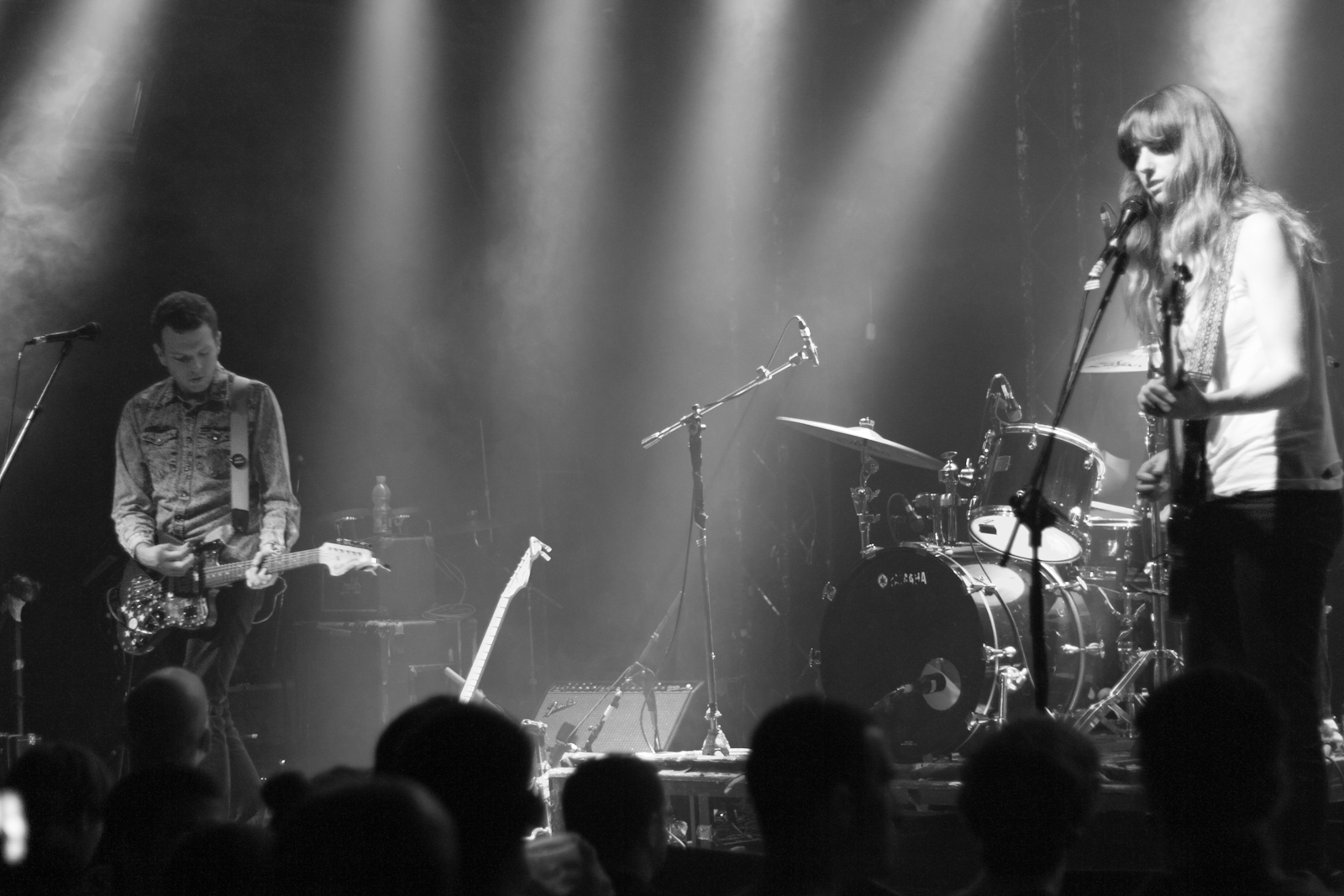
Ringo Deathstarr at the Tel Aviv Barby, August 2013

=== Studio albums ===
- Colour Trip (2011, Club AC30/Sonic Unyon/Vinyl Junkie Recordings)
- Mauve (2012, Club AC30/Sonic Unyon/Vinyl Junkie Recordings)
- God's Dream (2013, Neon Sigh/Noyes Records/Vinyl Junkie Recordings)
- Pure Mood (2015, Club AC30/The Reverberation Appreciation Society/Vinyl Junkie Recordings)
- Ringo Deathstarr (2020, Club AC30/Vinyl Junkie Recordings)

=== EPs ===
- Ringo Deathstarr CD (2007, self-released/SVC Records)
- Shadow CD/10" (2011, Club AC30/Vinyl Junkie Recordings)

=== Singles ===
- "You Don't Listen" 7" (2009, Custom Made Music)
- "In Love" 7" (2009, SVC Records)
- "Dream About Me"/"Tambourine Girl" 7" split with the Depreciation Guild (2009, Club AC30)
- "So High" 7" (2011, Club AC30)
- "Rip" CD/7" (2012, Club AC30/Vinyl Junkie Recordings)

=== Compilation albums ===
- Sparkler (2009, Vinyl Junkie Recordings)
