= Mauve (album) =

Studio album by Ringo Deathstarr
- Released: September 24, 2012
- Genre: Shoegaze, noise pop, alternative rock
- Length: 39:52
- Label: Club AC30, Sonic Unyon, Vinyl Junkie Recordings

Ringo Deathstarr chronology
Colour Trip (2011)	Mauve (2012)	Gods Dream (2013)

Professional ratings
Review scores
Source	Rating
AllMusic	4/5 stars
Consequence of Sound	C−
Drowned in Sound	8/10

Mauve is the second studio album by American shoegaze band Ringo Deathstarr. It was released on September 19, 2012, by Vinyl Junkie Recordings in Japan, and on September 24, 2012, by Club AC30 in the UK and Sonic Unyon in North America.

== Track listing ==
No.	Title	Length
1.	"Rip"	2:26
2.	"Burn"	2:41
3.	"Drain"	2:16
4.	"Slack"	2:19
5.	"Brightest Star"	5:47
6.	"Drag"	2:43
7.	"Fifteen"	2:41
8.	"Girls We Know"	3:27
9.	"Nap Time"	3:47
10.	"Waste"	3:47
11.	"Do You Wanna?"	2:26
12.	"Please Don't Kill Yourself"	2:31
13.	"Wave"	2:59
Total length:		39:52
