= Marcela Del Sol =

Australian/Chilean writer (born 1973)

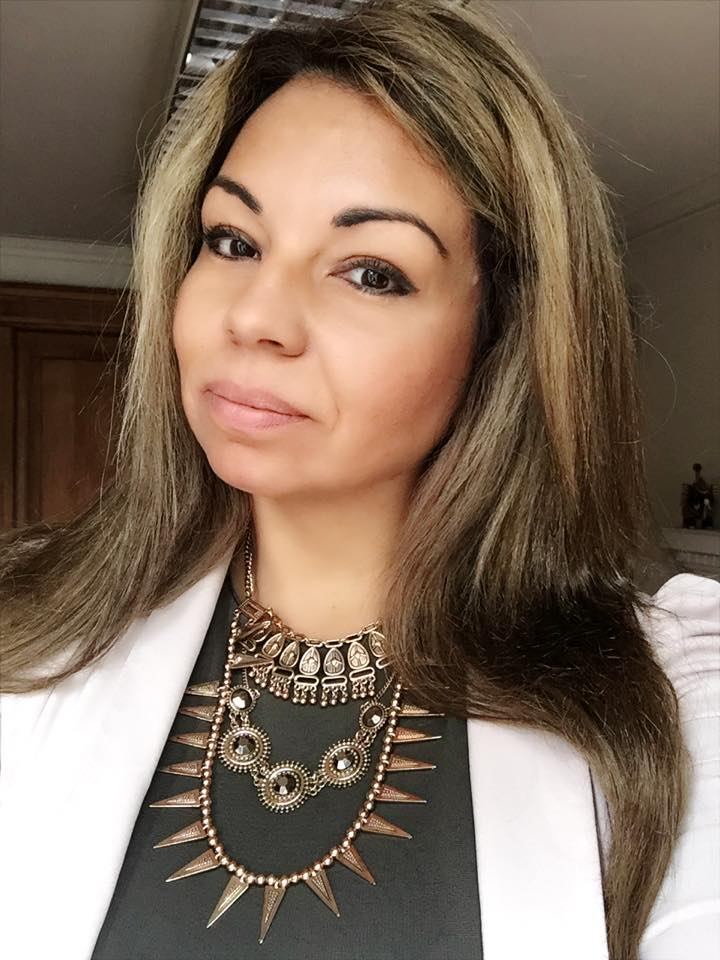
- Born: Marcela López-Flores; 10 July 1973 (age 53); Antofagasta, Chile
- Citizenship: Australian–Chilean
- Occupation: Author
- Writing career
- Language: English – Spanish
- Website: marceladelsol.net

Marcela Del Sol (born 10 July 1973), also known as Marcela del Sol-Hallet, is a Chile-born Australian writer, known for her books ImmorTal and Kaleidoscope: My Life's Multiple Reflections.

Del Sol's literature encapsulates her personal views about sexuality. Her writing style sheds light on patriarchy and sexual abuse, Del Sol is the founder of RelacioneSexuales, a feminist group that holds regular sessions that allows for discussions on issues of gender and violence.

Del Sol is known for both financing and implementing art education programs for at-risk children in Chile.

== Biography ==
Her father is a musician, songwriter and ex convicted felon; her mother worked as a theatre actress and Special education teacher. Marcela's younger brother, Felipe Sebastián, is a multi-instrumentalist, Network security expert, who also played for a heavy metal band Panzer and Chilean progressive rock pioneer with the musical trio, Elefhante.

Her paternal grandmother Victoria Idalia Campusano was a socialist political figure in Chile and a close friend who run a campaign of Chilean Socialist President Salvador Allende. Marcela's family owned a hotel chain in Chile, now dissolved, her maternal aunt Aurora Williams Baussa was the Chilean Minister for Mining during President Michelle Bachelet second period and was accused of mishandling and allegations of corruption. Del Sol was educated in Instituto Santa Maria, a German Catholic School in Antofagasta, Chile where she was distinguished and awarded for her literary talent.

She met an Australian scientist in Antofagasta, who is her former husband and the father of her two children. In the early 1990s they both migrated to Australia.

Marcela del Sol started writing at a very early age. She took part in writing competitions as a schoolgirl and later on, at age 14, published a poetry piece for a local government newsletter.

Prior to her writing career, she worked as a ghostwriter, working with biographies.

She was diagnosed with dissociative identity disorder, posttraumatic stress disorder in 2013, following a number of adverse experiences, including sexual abuse and an accident and decided to come out in the open about her condition on international media. She has been outspoken about eradicating stigma attached to mental health sufferers and has made several appearances in the media to this effect, including a documentary of 60 Minutes, which sparked some hurtful opinions about del Sol that were responded to by Peter Stefanovic and D.I.D. specialist psychiatrist Nick Bendit in support of Marcela.

In 2016 Del Sol was involved in a publicly criticised radio interview with Jackie O and Kyle Sandilands where controversial Sandilands expressed he would like to have sex with del Sol if he were single and proceeded to strip live at her request during one of del Sol's dissociative episodes.

Del Sol studied dramatic arts at NIDA and called herself "an eternal student".

Marcela del Sol is also the founder of RelacioneSexuales an annual cycle of feminist conversations open to public. The group features celebrities that share their stories, but also provides legal and psychological support, and sexual education to women who need it.

Some of these well known speakers include: TV and radio personality Nicolas Copano, Juan Sativo, photographer Zaida Gonzalez (also sister to Los Prisioneros Jorge González), photographer Gabriela Rivera, Mapuche leader Ana Llao, and singer Planta Carnivora.

Marcela del Sol currently resides in Newcastle, New South Wales.

== Literary career ==
In December 2016 del Sol launched a regionalized Chilean version of a book, titled Caleidoscopio (Kaleidoscope: My Life's Multiple Reflections). The novel tells the story of Lucia, an overly sexual woman who, like the author, lives with Dissociative identity disorder and post-traumatic stress disorder. The plot follows Lucia, who enjoys solace and tries to keep alive in the rough world of hatred and sexual abuse. The book sparked controversy due to its highly explicit sexual content. The English version followed soon after.

In 2017 Marcela published her second book, ImmorTal. The book is a collection of real life stories of sexual violence of Chilean women with strong emphasis on the clergy and upper classes. Marcela's close friend, Gabriela Rivera Lucero, a renowned Chilean feminist photographer collaborated to create a series of pictures, presented in this book. Photographs feature a collection of churches and cemeteries, as well as some studio shots featuring Julio Jung.

An inspiration to publish ImmorTal came from a case of Nabila Rifo, one of the most violent domestic violence crimes in Chile. The victim was beaten by her ex-partner, had her eyes gouged and lost her vision. Del Sol felt the urge to immortalize the story and raise awareness on gender violence and Nabila Rifo and has been a tireless supporter of hers, the two are now friends. Rifo wrote a few lines as a call to end violence against women, which were included in ImmorTal.

Del Sol has been a collaborator in a number of publications in Australia and Chile and participates in social poetry events in Australia. Her most recent book (ImmorTal) includes photos by Gabriela Rivera and Elizabeth Neira.

== Books ==
- Caleidoscopio (Spanish version, 2016)
- Kaleidoscope: My Life's Multiple Reflections (English version, 2016)
- ImmorTal (Spanish version, 2017)
