= 515 Walnut Tower =

High-rise building in Des Moines, Iowa, United States

- Interactive map of the 515 Walnut Tower area

General information
- Status: Under construction
- Type: Residential
- Location: 515 Walnut Street, Des Moines, Iowa, United States
- Coordinates: 41.5857°N 93.6251°W
- Groundbreaking: December 2024
- Completed: 2027 (expected)
- Cost: $148 million

Height
- Architectural: 360 ft (110 m)
- Tip: 360 ft (110 m)
- Roof: 360 ft (110 m)

Technical details
- Floor count: 33
- Lifts/elevators: TBD

Design and construction
- Architect: Neumann Monson Architects
- Developer: St. Joseph Group
- Main contractor: Beal Derkenne Construction

515 Walnut Tower is a 33-story residential high-rise building under construction in downtown Des Moines, Iowa, United States, located at 515 Walnut Street. Upon completion, it will be the largest residential building in Downtown Des Moines by unit count and the fourth-tallest building in Iowa, standing at 347 feet (106 m). The project is developed by St. Joseph Group and is expected to be completed in 2027.

== History ==
=== Background ===
The project was first proposed in 2016 by Blackbird Investments, which planned a 33-story residential tower with 336 units. Financial difficulties and lawsuits against Blackbird for unpaid loans halted progress, and the city terminated the development agreement on June 1, 2020. In 2022, Joe Teeling, former president of Blackbird Investments, revived the project through St. Joseph Group, using the original plans. The Des Moines City Council approved preliminary terms for the project in November 2022 and a final development agreement on December 23, 2024, providing up to $3.8 million in tax increment financing over 14 years, $500,000 in American Rescue Plan Act funding, and a 10-year declining residential tax abatement.

Demolition of the Kaleidoscope at the Hub began in April 2023 and was completed in July 2023, severing skywalk connections that St. Joseph Group is required to reconnect by June 11, 2026. Initial financing challenges, including rising interest rates on tax-exempt municipal bonds, delayed groundbreaking from October 31, 2023, to January 2025. St. Joseph Group secured funding from an East Coast equity fund to cover the entire project cost.

=== Construction ===
Construction began in December 2024, with crews drilling 30 caissons to a depth of 120 feet (37 m) for the foundation, 17 of which were completed by February 2025. Vertical construction is expected to start in spring 2025, with completion projected for spring 2027. Beal Derkenne Construction serves as the general contractor. The project faced delays due to debris from previous structures found 25 feet (7.6 m) below the site, slowing foundation work. The tower is expected to create over 700 construction jobs and will be the most significant addition to the Des Moines skyline since the 801 Grand building was completed in 1991.

On October 27, 2025, construction was paused due to project finances. Two weeks later, on November 12, construction resumed.

== Design ==
515 Walnut Tower was designed by Neumann Monson Architects and primarily features a glass facade. All 30 residential floors will contain thirteen apartment units, totaling 390 apartment units throughout the tower. Original designs included a cantilevered rooftop pool, but this was replaced with a smaller lounge pool on the rooftop terrace. The first floor will house a lobby, bike storage, a dog run, and a cafe, while the second floor will include a leasing office, yoga space, and fitness center. The building is designed to meet updated energy efficiency requirements set by the city of Des Moines. The building will feature 1,400 square feet (130 m²) of commercial space, including a coffee shop, bike storage, a dog park, coworking spaces, fitness rooms, and a rooftop terrace. The tower will connect to the Des Moines Skywalk system and lease up to 390 parking spaces in the nearby Fifth and Walnut parking ramp. The project is estimated to cost $148 million, with an assessed value of $69.5 million upon completion.
