= Kaleidoscope (software) =

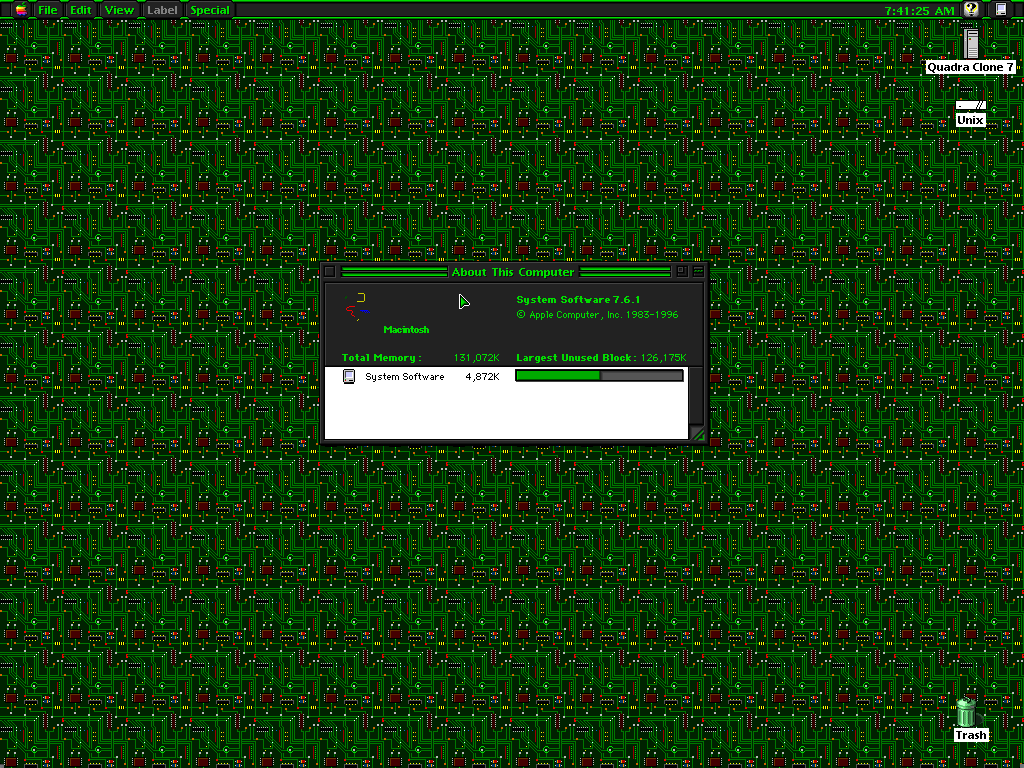
- Kaleidoscope on System 7
- Developer: Arlo Rose and Greg Landweber
- Working state: Historic, not supported
- Source model: Closed source
- Initial release: May 13, 1991; 35 years ago
- Latest release: 2.3.1
- License: Proprietary
- Official website: kaleidoscope.net at the Wayback Machine (archived 2011-09-28)

Kaleidoscope is a third party theme manager for System 7 and Mac OS 8, written by Arlo Rose and Greg Landweber. It utilizes a proprietary framework to apply "schemes" to the Macintosh GUI, long before Apple released the Appearance Manager system with Mac OS 8 (later updated in Mac OS 8.5, providing similar functionality using "themes"). Whereas only a few Appearance Manager themes were ever developed, tens of thousands of Kaleidoscope schemes were developed.

== History ==
When theme support in the Appearance Control Panel was first announced, the team responsible for it demonstrated an automatic tool specifically designed to convert existing Kaleidoscope scheme files into Appearance Manager-compatible theme files. This tool was never released to the public.

Kaleidoscope remained the primary theme platform, even after the Appearance Control Panel offered theme capabilities in Mac OS 8.5. Steve Jobs returned to Apple just before the release of Mac OS 8.5, and he officially discontinued support for themes in order to force a consistent user interface.

Because of this, Apple released little documentation for the theme format, withheld its own beta-released themes, and even issued a cease and desist notice to the authors of a third-party theme editor on grounds that it was intended to allow users to create themes that imitate the Aqua interface of Mac OS X. At the same time, the format of Kaleidoscope schemes continued to evolve. As a result, Kaleidoscope schemes proliferated while Appearance themes never really did. Kaleidoscope was only rendered obsolete with the transition to Mac OS X, with which Kaleidoscope is not compatible.
