= Colour Trip =

Studio album by Ringo Deathstarr
- Released: February 2011
- Genre: Shoegaze, noise pop, alternative rock
- Length: 32:45
- Label: Club AC30, Sonic Unyon, Vinyl Junkie Recordings

Ringo Deathstarr chronology
Sparkler (2009)	Colour Trip (2011)	Mauve (2012)

Professional ratings
Review scores
Source	Rating
AllMusic	4/5 stars
Drowned in Sound	6/10 stars
Consequence of Sound	3/5 stars

Colour Trip is the debut studio album by American shoegaze band Ringo Deathstarr. It was released February 14, 2011 in the UK on Club AC30, then licensed to Sonic Unyon for release in North America, and Vinyl Junkie Recordings for release in Japan.

== Track listing ==
No.	Title	Length
1.	"Imagine Hearts"	2:39
2.	"Do It Every Time"	2:38
3.	"So High"	2:02
4.	"Two Girls"	2:58
5.	"Kaleidoscope"	2:05
6.	"Day Dreamy"	3:18
7.	"Tambourine Girl"	3:38
8.	"Chloe"	3:17
9.	"Never Drive"	4:13
10.	"You Don't Listen"	2:29
11.	"Other Things"	3:28
Total length:		32:45
