= Kaleidoscope (music duo) =

- Origin: Nashville, Tennessee
- Genres: Worship, Christian pop
- Years active: 2014–present
- Members: Cammie Avers; Natalie Brown
- Website: kaleidoscopeduo.com

Kaleidoscope is an American female Christian music pop duo of Cammie Avers and Natalie Brown, who play a Christian pop and worship style of music. They originally met while they were attending Belmont University in Nashville, Tennessee. Their first extended play, Kaleidoscope, was released in 2015.

== Background ==
Cammie Avers was born Camaryn Elizabeth Rogers, on November 13, 1988, in Detroit, Michigan, the daughter of John Craig and Patricia E. Rogers (née, Whiteside), while she grew up in Fort Worth, Texas, eventually marrying her high school boyfriend, Steven Avers, who is a medical doctor.

Natalie Brown was born Natalie Marie McDonald, on December 22, 1989, in Los Gatos, California, the daughter of a lawyer, Edward Court, Jr. and Mary McDonald (née, Simon), while she grew up with two older brothers, eventually marrying her boyfriend of two years, Casey Brown, a Christian music songwriter and producer.

They both met while they were students at Belmont University in Nashville, Tennessee, where they were and still are best friends while going to university together. They started professionally recording music in 2014.

== Music history ==
The duo started in 2014, with their first extended play, Kaleidoscope, that was released on September 1, 2015, independently.

== Members ==
- Camaryn Elizabeth "Cammie" Avers (née; Rogers, born November 13, 1988, in Detroit, Michigan)
- Natalie Marie Brown (née, McDonald, born December 22, 1989, in Los Gatos, California)

== Discography ==
EPs

- Kaleidoscope (September 1, 2015)
