= A Reason to Swim =

EP by Joe Brooks
- Released: September 6, 2011 (US)
- Recorded: Spring 2011; Revolver Recordings; Westlake Village, CA; RW Productions; Los Angeles, CA; The Backyard; Los Angeles, CA
- Genres: Alternative rock, pop
- Length: 23:10
- Label: Fantastik Music LLC
- Producers: Mikal Blue, Rune Westberg, Stuart Brawley

Joe Brooks EP chronology
Acoustic Sessions EP (2007)	A Reason to Swim (2011)

A Reason to Swim is the third EP of singer/songwriter Joe Brooks and is his first independent release following his departure from Lava Records/Universal Republic Records. It was released through Fantastic Music LLC in the US on September 6, 2011.

== History ==
A Reason to Swim is the fourth overall release of artist Joe Brooks and his third EP. Following being dropped from Lava Records/Universal Republic Records in early 2011 Brooks quickly began putting together music for an EP release. To fund the album independently Brooks started a threshold pledge system through the site PledgeMusic. Designated the "Fans Only EP", people who pledged money were able to receive signed memorabilia, access to Joe Brooks concerts or even a prom date with Brooks. Funding for the album exceeded its goal, with additional money going toward the filming of the music video "Holes Inside." "Holes Inside" was released on YouTube a day after the album, on September 7.

The EP was licensed and released by Sony in Korea and Malaysia. As part of the promotion, Brooks attended a media tour in Korea to support A Reason to Swim, appearing on national television and Korean publications of Nylon and Teen Vogue. The song "Someday (OK)" was also featured on Superstar K3.

== Track listing ==
No.	Title	Writer(s)	Length
1.	"Someday (OK)"	Brooks, Westberg	3:44
2.	"I Find the Light in You"	Brooks, Page, Marr	4:57
3.	"Green Eyes"	Brooks, Fontana, Rotem	3:24
4.	"Holes Inside"	Brooks, Falk, Bjorsell	3:32
5.	"My Heart Will Wait"	Brooks, Westberg	4:26
6.	"For You"	Brooks, Westberg	3:07

== Personnel ==
=== Musicians ===
- Joe Brooks: Vocals, Acoustic Guitar (all tracks) String Arrangement (track 4)
- Rune Westberg: Electric Guitar, Bass, Programming (tracks 1,5,6)
- Mikal Blue: Bass (tracks 2,4,5) String Arrangement (track 4)
- Eric Nelson: (track 2)
- Billy Hawn: Guitar (track 2)
- Matt Mayhall: (track 3)
- Stuart Brawley: Rhodes, Harp, Organ, Strings (track 3)
- Adam Hamilton: Bass (track 3)
- Joe Corcoran: Horns, Electric Guitar
- Sara Haze: Background Vocals (track 4)
- Victor Indrizzo: Drums (track 4)
- David Levita: Guitars (track 4)
- Kevin Daniel: Piano (track 4)
- Fredrick Bokkenheuser: Drums (track 5)

=== Production ===
- Mikal Blue: Producer
- Rune Westberg: Producer
- Stuart Brawley: Producer
- Jess Sojka: Engineer
- Joe Yannece: Mastering
- Joe Corcoran: Digital Editing
- Ehud Kaldes: Engineer
- Ken Krongard: Management
- Reid Hunter: Legal
- Joe Brooks: Art Direction, Design, Cover Art
- Felicia Simion: Cover Photography
- Shane Fabila: Inside Photography
