= Kaleidoscope (retailer) =

UK fashion retailer

Kaleidoscope is a catalogue and online based retailer specialising in women's fashion and accessories, but also stocking homewear and electricals. Kaleidoscope is owned by Freemans Grattan Holdings (previously named Otto UK), which is in turn owned by Otto GmbH – one of the largest retailers in the world with over 50,000 employees at 123 companies across more than 20 countries.

Freemans Grattan Holdings largely operates in the UK through brands including Freemans, Grattan, Kaleidoscope, Oli, Look Again, Bon Prix and Witt. The company also owns Hermes (Previously named Parcelnet) – A European home delivery courier company

== History ==
Kaleidoscope was originally a division of W H Smith, and traded as its Book Club merchandise catalogue. This division was better known as BCA (Book Club Associates). In 1982 Grattan purchased both the Kaleidoscope name and the mailing list. The operation was operated from a location in Leicester with both computer and distribution resources being used in Bradford, from Grattan.

In 1985 Grattan purchased the Scotcade operation in Bridgnorth, Shropshire, Kaleidoscope relocated there and operated from with both Companies under one roof. The next few years saw the business develop and the acquisition of Aspect (a similar operation to Scotcade), which was originally based in Wetherby. This growth led to the formation of a strong Direct Mail Division. During this time Grattan, under the direction of David Jones (MD), had merged with Next who were based in Leicester and managed by George Davies (retailer) - who is now synonymous with the ‘George’ brand in Asda stores. As a result of the Next site having sizeable office space Kaleidoscope returned to Leicester in 1989.

1991 saw the current owners, Otto GmbH, purchase Grattan Plc, with Kaleidoscope part of this deal. The Direct Mail Division remained in Leicester, but moved to a new location in 1994–1995. In 1997 Kaleidoscope moved to Bradford wjoining the rest of the group. They occupied in a separate office space on the third floor of Anchor House, Bradford, housing the Kaleidoscope operation.

In December 2008, Otto UK became Freemans Grattan Holdings (FGH) Kaleidoscope is one of their brands. The business has seen a gross annual turnover of £4m in 1982 increasing to its current figure of approximately £100m. The work force has 60 personnel, with the resources of FGH playing a vital supporting role.

The main focus now is on women's fashion targeting affluent women aged predominantly 45+; the product range also includes fashion accessories, bedding and soft furnishings, homewares. and gardening. Approximately half of all demand is generated online.

== Location ==
Kaleidoscope is based at Vicar Lane in Bradford along with Freemans Grattan Holdings and all of its sub-companies.

== Website ==
- www.kaleidoscope.co.uk
