= Kaleidoscope at the Hub =

Defunct shopping mall in Des Moines, Iowa, United States

- Location: Des Moines, Iowa, United States
- Coordinates: 41.5860°N 93.6240°W
- Opened: 1985
- Closed: 2019 (demolished in 2023)
- Owner: EMC Insurance
- Num. of stores: 30+
- Num. of anchor tenants: 1 (Younkers)
- Floor area: 246,682 sq ft (22,917.5 m^{2})
- Floors: 3
- Public transit: DART

Kaleidoscope at the Hub was an indoor mall in downtown Des Moines, Iowa built by Hubbell Realty in 1985. The original ownership groups included Equitable of Iowa, Midamerican Energy and Hubbell. The east "block" of the mall had a vibrant Food Court with approximately 7 restaurants at any given time. The first tenant to open in the mall was Panda Chinese Food in the Food Court. Other stores that were leased in the building include Vogue Vision, Skeffington's formalwear, Laura Ashley, Musicland, Ritz Camera, Michael J's, Seifert's, Johnston & Murphy, Walker's Shoe Store, Peck & Peck, Alphabet Soup toys and many more. The Kaleidoscope was accessible from the skywalk or from the ground level. It was in close proximity to many Des Moines attractions including the East Village and Casey's Center.

== Replacement ==
In May 2018, it was announced that Blackbird Investments planned to build an apartment tower at 515 Walnut Street. The eastern half of the mall was vacated and then removed in February 2019 to make room for the 33-story residential skyscraper. The west part of the former Kaleidoscope from 7th Street to 6th Street remains, but it is now referred to as the Hub, not Kaleidoscope Mall.

In February 2023, the mall was boarded up in preparation of its demolition. The building was gutted in April, was fully demolished soon thereafter. The project was delayed for several years due to a lawsuit on another property and the COVID-19 pandemic. The skyscraper on the property, 515 Walnut Tower, is expected to be completed in 2027.
