= Gabriel Rivera-Barraza =

Mexican-American author

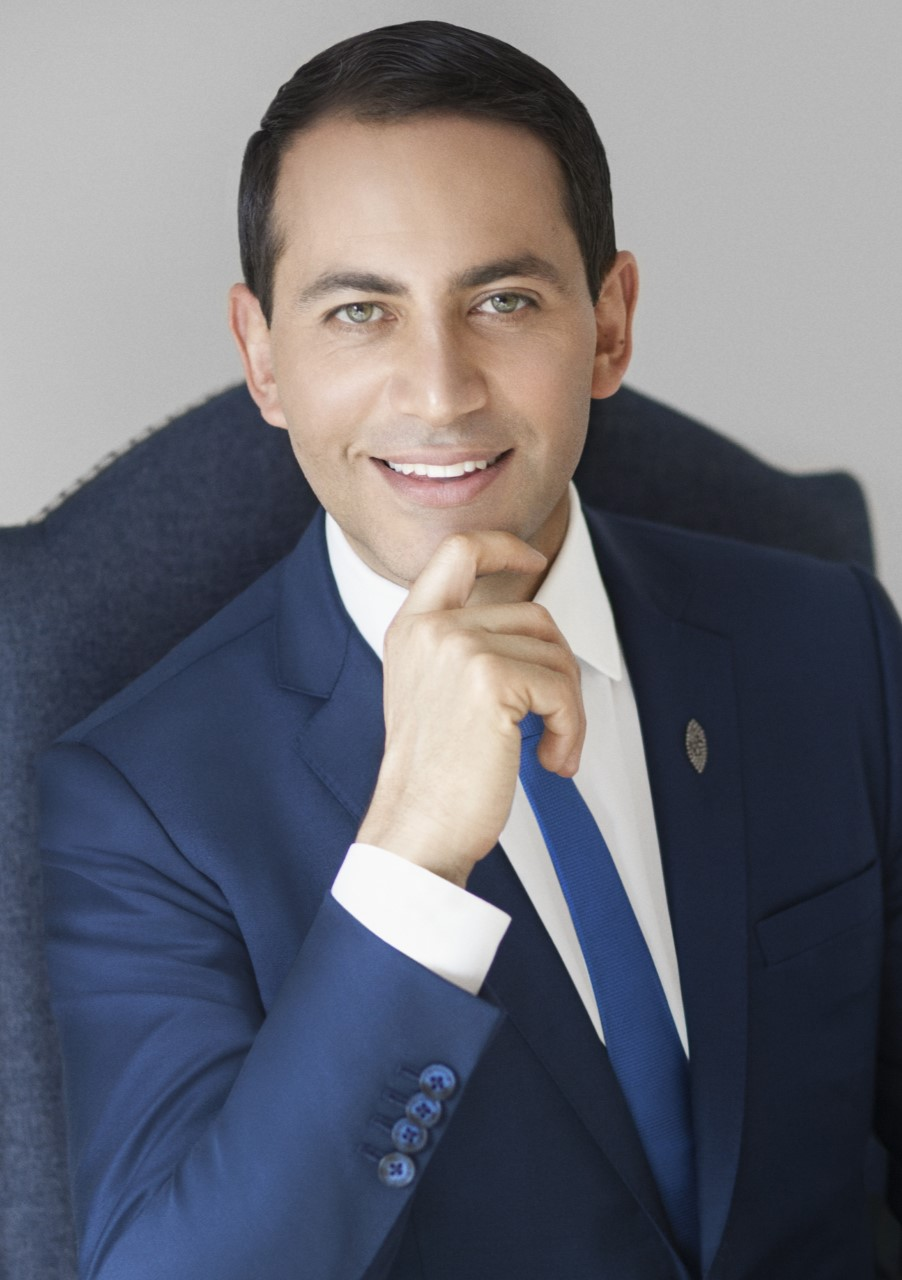
Gabriel Rivera-Barraza, 2018.

Gabriel Rivera-Barraza (born in Durango, Mexico) is a Mexican author and the founder of GRB Communications. He is the co-author of Nuevo New York (2016).
