= Velvet Eden =

Japanese visual kei dark wave band

- Dada and Kalm circa 2000

Background information
- Origin: Tokyo, Japan
- Genres: Dark wave; electronic; rock
- Years active: 1998–2002; 2010–2016
- Labels: Arachne; Castle Records; Panther Pink; Starwave Records
- Past members: Dada; Kalm; Bera; R.Y.O; Abexxx; Hora; Lem; Mimi; Aci; Yurikago; Lilly; Ceeei; Chro; Gemma

Velvet Eden (stylized as VELVET EDEN) was a Japanese visual kei dark wave band formed in 1998 in Tokyo by vocalist Dada and keyboardist Kalm. Starting as a dark wave and electronic music band with a gothic aesthetic, following Kalm's departure in 2000, they shifted toward a rock-oriented sound and underwent several lineup changes. Disbanded in 2002, Velvet Eden resumed activities in 2010 with a revised lineup, returning to their dark wave style. They ceased activities again in 2016.

== History ==
=== 1998–2000: Early years ===
The band was formed in November 1998 in Tokyo with vocalist Dada (formerly of E-Typ and Pride of Mind) and keyboardist Kalm. They held their first live performance at the Shibuya On Air West music venue on November 14. In March 1999, an independent record label Arachne was established to manage Velvet Eden's releases. The duo released their first two demo tapes in March and July 1999: "Street of Alice" and "Madame Tarantula".

In December 1999, Velvet Eden signed with Castle Records. They released their first EP, "Ningyou Shoukan", via the label. It was followed by a video album Sad Mask next year. The duo began working on their second EP, titled "Street of Alice".

=== 2000–2002: Lineup changes and disbandment ===
Keyboardist Kalm left the band on March 27, 2000. Despite his departure, the "Street of Alice" EP was released on schedule in May of that year. Four new members joined Velvet Eden: guitarist Bera, bassist R.Y.O, drummer Abexxx, and keyboardist Hora (later of Schwarz Stein). Along with the release of the single "Sute Neko" featuring this lineup, Velvet Eden's music shifted from dark wave to rock.

Velvet Eden returned to the Arachne label in December 2000 and released another demo tape, "Kumo Onna". At the end of 2000 and the beginning of 2001, Abexxx, R.Y.O, and Hora left the band, and bassist Mimi and drummer Lem joined. The band released the "Opera-za no Kaijin" demo in May 2001. Three more demo tapes were released in 2002.

Velvet Eden disbanded in 2002, after Dada failed to show up to one of their live performances. According to Dada, his absence was caused by an eardrum injury he suffered during a prior rehearsal. The three other members, Bera, Mimi, and Lem, formed a new band named The Velvet. In the years that followed, Dada took on various works, including working as a model for the Arachnophobia fashion brand, producing illustrations for Dir En Grey, and designing Gothic Lolita clothes for KOMACHI 2266531 Dark Lolita.

=== 2010–2016: Reformation ===
On May 1, 2010, Velvet Eden resumed activities after Dada recruited violinist Aci and two dancers: Lilly and Yurikago. The band returned to their original dark wave sound and published a number of new songs on Myspace. In October 2010, Velvet Eden embarked on their first international tour to Russia. Yurikago left the band in 2011 and was replaced by Ceeei. In March 2011, the band released the EP "Witch on Flames" via Dada's new record label, Panther Pink. The band collaborated with Kalm to release "Street of Alice 2.0", a new version of their 1999 song. Aci left the band shortly after the release.

The band played their first concert in China in October 2011. They planned to go to Moscow with The Candy Spooky Theater and Közi for a Halloween concert, however, it was moved and took place in Japan. Guitarist Chro joined the band in early 2012. They became affiliated with Starwave Records. Despite Dada announcing that Velvet Eden would cease activities in December 2012, the band remained active. Chro switched to bass in February 2013 when a new guitarist, Takmi, joined.

Velvet Eden released a best-of album titled Double Twelve in February 2014. Later that year, they released another video album. Another mini-album, "Blanc et Noir", was released in March 2015. Also in 2015, Dada appeared in a music video for a song by Merry. Velvet Eden's last EP, "Requiem", was released in April 2016.

== Artistry ==
Velvet Eden's aesthetics were described as gothic, and their music has been generally classified as dark wave. The songs featured on the band's two first EPs, "Ningyou Shoukan" and "Street of Alice", were composed by Kalm. Following Kalm's departure and the recruitment of new members, Velvet Eden's music shifted from dark wave and electronic to rock. Lyrics to the band's songs, written by Dada, tell a story about a girl named Alice, Madame Tarantula, and a fortune teller, and reference themes such as ball-jointed dolls.

== Members ==
Last lineup

- Dada – vocals (1998–2016)
- Chro – keyboard, guitar, bass (2011–2016)

Former members

- Kalm – keyboard (1998–2000)
- Bera – guitar (2000–2002)
- R.Y.O – bass (2000)
- Abexxx – drums (2000)
- Hora – keyboard (2000–2001)
- Lem – drums (2001–2002)
- Mimi – bass (2001–2002)
- Aci – violin, keyboard (2010–2011)
- Lilly – dancer (2010–2016)
- Yurikago – dancer (2010)
- Ceeei – dancer (2011–2016)
- Gemma – dancer (2013–2016)

== Discography ==
EPs

- "Ningyou Shoukan" (1999)
- "Street of Alice" (2000)
- "Witch on Flames" (2011)
- "Blanc et Noir" (2015)
- "Requiem" (2016)

Best-of album

- Double Twelve (2014)
