= Kaya (Japanese musician) =

Japanese visual kei musician

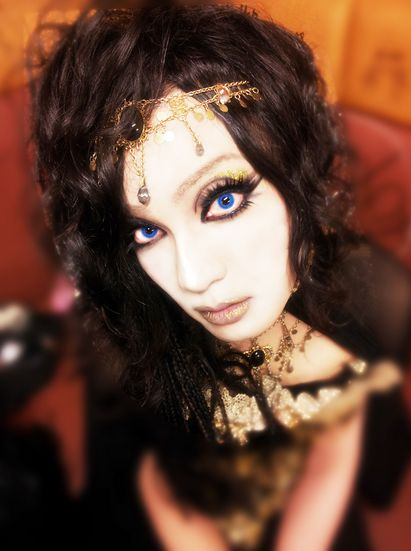

Background information
- Also known as: Hime
- Origin: Tokushima Prefecture, Japan
- Genres: Electronica; synthpop; dark wave; electronic rock
- Occupations: Musician, singer
- Instruments: vocals, piano, keyboards
- Label: Traumerei Inc.
- Website: kaya-rose.com

Kaya (迦夜) is a Japanese visual kei musician, a vocalist of the electro/darkwave duo Schwarz Stein, and a former vocalist of the bands Meties and Isola under the alias of Hime. He is also known for his androgynous appearance.

== Early life ==
Kaya's interest in music was inspired by his parents, especially his mother. At the age of three, Kaya performed at a local festival. He says, "From that day on, I wanted to be in the spotlight. That was the day I decided I wanted to become a professional singer."

== Career ==
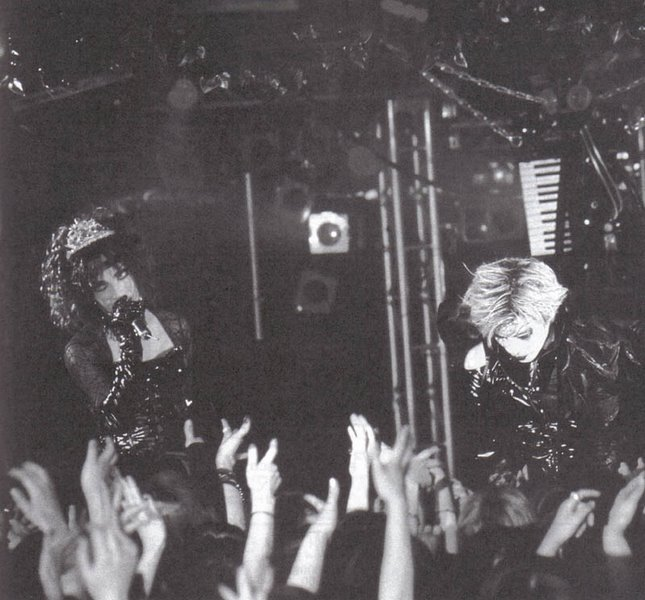
Schwarz Stein live in 2003, Kaya on the left

In 1997, Kaya debuted under the name Hime as a vocalist of the visual kei band Meties, before later joining Isola. When Isola disbanded in 2001, Kaya became the vocalist for the darkwave duo Schwarz Stein, produced by Mana and signed to his label Midi:Nette.

He also has been a solo artist since 2006, and in 2008 he made a major solo debut with the single "Chocolat". Originally on Mana's record label, Midi:Nette, Kaya later signed to Next Music Inc., and the label's name was changed to Next Media Communications Inc. The label however went bankrupt in the summer of 2009 resulting in Kaya having to go back to an indie label.

On July 13, 2016, he held a special 10th anniversary performance at Shinjuku ReNY, titled "The Birth of DIVA", with Kamijo as a special guest. Meties was revived for one-night only as part of the celebrations. In 2017 Schwarz Stein released a 15th anniversary album of their greatest hits.

== Influences ==
Kaya covered Laputa's song "揺れながら… (Yurenagara...)" on the compilation album "CRUSH!-90’s V-Rock best hit cover songs-", and have had a friendly relationship with ex-members of Laputa.

== Discography ==
=== Albums ===
- Glitter (27 December 2006)
- Hyakki Yagyou (11 July 2007)
- Glitter (Best of Indies) (16 July 2008)
- Kaya Meikyoku Series 1: BonJour! Chanson (18 February 2009)
- Queen (20 April 2011)
- Glitter (3rd press) (12 December 2012)
- Gothic (4 December 2013)
- DRESS (23 June 2019)
- ROSE (8 June 2022)
- Kaya BEST -Sweet- (20 January 2026)
- Kaya BEST -Bitter~ (20 January 2026)

=== Singles & EP’s ===
- "Kaleidoscope" (28 June 2006)
- "Masquerade" (6 September 2006)
- "Ouka Ryouran" (4 April 2007)
- "Carmilla" (31 October 2007)
- "Chocolat" (23 April 2008)
- "Last Snow" (24 December 2008)
- "Ophelia" (22 July 2009)
- "Kaya Remix vol.1 K" (27 December 2009)
- "Awilda" (28 July 2010)
- "Madame Rosa no Shoukan" (22 December 2010)
- "Vampire Requiem" (25 January 2012)
- "Salome" (20 June 2012)
- "Nocturne" (12 December 2012)
- "Taboo" (31 July 2013)
- "Perfana" (19 October 2016)
- "Yumeji" (8 March 2017)
- "FABULOUS" (1 April 2018)
- "Monday Monday" (18 July 2018)
- "Hannya" (27 August 2020)
- "Villains" (17 July 2023)
- "Bouquet" (9 October 2024)
- "Le Revenant (cover)" (30 January 2025)
- ”WORLD” (20 May 2026)

=== with Node of Scherzo ===
- Node of Scherzo (31 October 2007)
