= Schwarz Stein =

Japanese visual kei electronic music duo

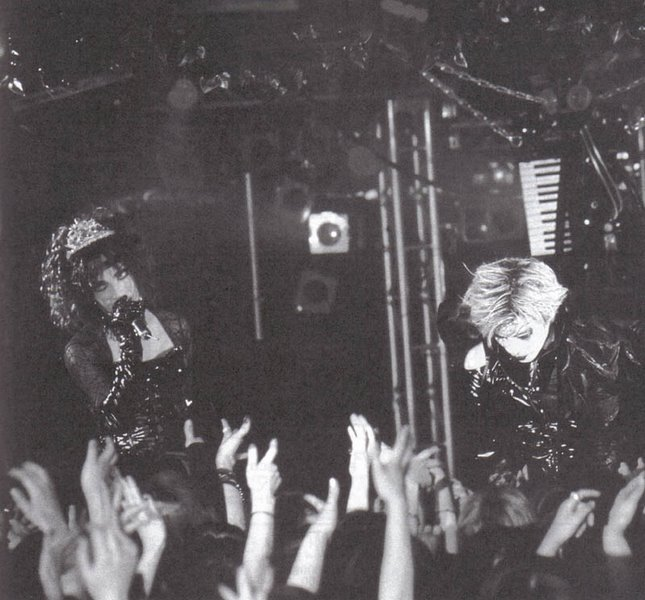
- From left to right Kaya and Hora in 2003

Background information
- Origin: Japan
- Genres: Electronica; synthpop; dark wave
- Years active: 2001–2004, 2011 (One-off Reunion), 2014–Present
- Label: Midi:Nette
- Past members: Hora; Kaya
- Website: Schwarz Stein

Schwarz Stein is a Japanese electronic music dark wave duo formed by Hora (洞) and Kaya (迦夜) in 2001 (as "Rudolf Steiner"), who disbanded in 2004 and rebanded in 2014.

== Biography ==
=== History ===
During its first three years of activity, the group consisted of Kaya on vocals (ex-Isola) and Hora (ex-Velvet Eden) as keyboardist and programmer. The two originally worked together under the alias Rudolf Steiner until their signing to ex-Malice Mizer guitarist Mana's record label Midi:Nette. Upon their 're-formation', Mana discarded the name Rudolf Steiner and christened the duo "Schwarz Stein" (pseudo-German for "Black Stone").

Prior to their name change, two demo tapes (Queen of Decadence and Perfect Garden) had been released. A re-worked version of Perfect Garden was later created as their Midi:Nette debut single. Schwarz Stein went on to release their first full album New Vogue Children in June 2003, the single Current in November of the same year, and then their final album Artificial Hallucination in February 2004. They opened for Moi dix Mois on several occasions, played at various events, and also made a number solo appearances as well.

Following their last performance on March 29, 2004, Schwarz Stein officially disbanded due to creative differences between its two members. The band was briefly reunited for the "Dis Inferno III: Last Year Party" event on December 15, 2004, hosted by their former label Midi:Nette.

A collaboration CD, another cell, was released in April 2006, limited to 1000 copies and only available for order through Kaya's official site. This limited edition CD features re-mixed/re-worked versions of Rudolf Steiner's "Kuro Ageha" as well as two songs from Hora's first CD Inner Universe, making up three of the eight total tracks.

In April 2011, both members announced on their respective web sites that Schwarz Stein would reunite for a single show on July 31 at Takadanobaba Area, to celebrate their 10th anniversary of working together. Tickets were also made available to overseas fans via CD Japan. A new mini-album, Recurrence of Hallucination, was also announced. After the live DVD of the show was released entitled Recurrence of Hallucination -LIVE- via Hora's website

In February 2014, at his final Gothic Elements tour concert in Shibuya, Kaya announced Schwarz Stein would regroup, with their first live performance and a new single in March.

== Members ==
- Kaya - Vocals, lyrics
- Hora - Keyboards, programming

== Discography ==
=== as Rudolf Steiner ===
- Queen of Decadence (demo) (June 1, 2001)
- Perfect Garden (demo) (November 12, 2001)

=== as Schwarz Stein ===
==== Singles ====
- Perfect Garden (July 31, 2002)
- Current (November 17, 2003)
- Gebet (March 26, 2014)
- COCOON -Fallen- (July 2, 2014)
- Sleeping Madness (November 5, 2014)
- Fleeting Beauty (February 26, 2017)
- Ever After (May 11, 2019)
- Queen Leech (July 20, 2019)

==== Albums ====
- New Vogue Children (June 30, 2003)
- Artificial Hallucination (February 25, 2004)
- Recurrence of Hallucination (July 20, 2011) [limited to 1000 copies]
- THE BEST (LICHT) (November 15, 2017)
- THE BEST (DUNKELHEIT) (November 15, 2017)
- Immortal Verses (EP) (September 1, 2018)
- DEMIGOD (October 10, 2024)

==== DVD ====
- Recurrence of Hallucination -LIVE- (24 December 2011) (Limited to 1000 copies)

=== as another cell ===
- another cell (April 1, 2006) [limited to 1000 copies]
